= Sugar House (disambiguation) =

Sugar House, Sugarhouse, and other variants of that phrase may refer to:

- A sugar shack, a cabin used to boil sap from sugar maple trees into maple syrup
- A sugarcane mill in sugar-growing regions
- Sugar House, Salt Lake City, a neighborhood in Salt Lake City, Utah
  - Sugar House Park, a park in the Sugar House neighborhood of Salt Lake City
  - Sugar House Prison (Utah), a prison in the Sugar House neighborhood of Salt Lake City
  - S Line (Utah Transit Authority), formerly known as Sugar House Streetcar
- Rivers Casino Philadelphia, formerly known as SugarHouse Casino
- Sugarhouse (film), a 2007 British thriller
- Sugar house prisons in New York City, facilities for holding British prisoners of war during the American Revolution

== See also ==
- Sugar Shack (disambiguation)
- House of Sugar, 2019 album by (Sandy) Alex G
- The Purple Gang, also known as The Sugar House Gang, Prohibition-era criminal organization in Detroit
