= Kopetz =

Kopetz is a surname. Notable people with the surname include:

- Barry Kopetz (born 1951), American music composer and conductor
- Hermann Kopetz (born 1943), Austrian computer scientist
- Ladislaus Michael Kopetz (1902–1966), Austrian crop farming scientist
- Vera Kopetz (1910–1998), German painter and graphic artist
- Paul Kopetz, Australian/Polish music composer, arranger, clarinettist, conductor, and music educator
