= Lehi Commercial and Savings Bank-Lehi Hospital =

- Formerly listed on the U.S. National Register of Historic Places
- Location within Utah Location within the United States
- Location: 206 E. State St., Lehi, Utah
- Coordinates: 40°23′46″N 111°50′42″W
- Area: 0.2 acres (0.081 ha)
- Built: 1891, 1925, 1937
- Built by: Dickerson, W.W.; Ohran, Charles
- Architectural style: Late Victorian
- MPS: Lehi, Utah MPS
- NRHP reference No.: 98001537

Significant dates
- Added to NRHP: December 17, 1998
- Removed from NRHP: March 26, 2018

The Lehi Commercial and Savings Bank-Lehi Hospital was a historic building in Lehi, Utah, USA. Located at 206 E. State St. in Lehi, Utah, it was built in 1891 to serve the Lehi Commercial and Savings Bank, which has also been known as the Utah Banking Company. It was built by Charles Ohran, a local mason. The building was modified in 1925 to accommodate a hospital on the second floor, which expanded downstairs in 1929. It was renovated further in 1937.

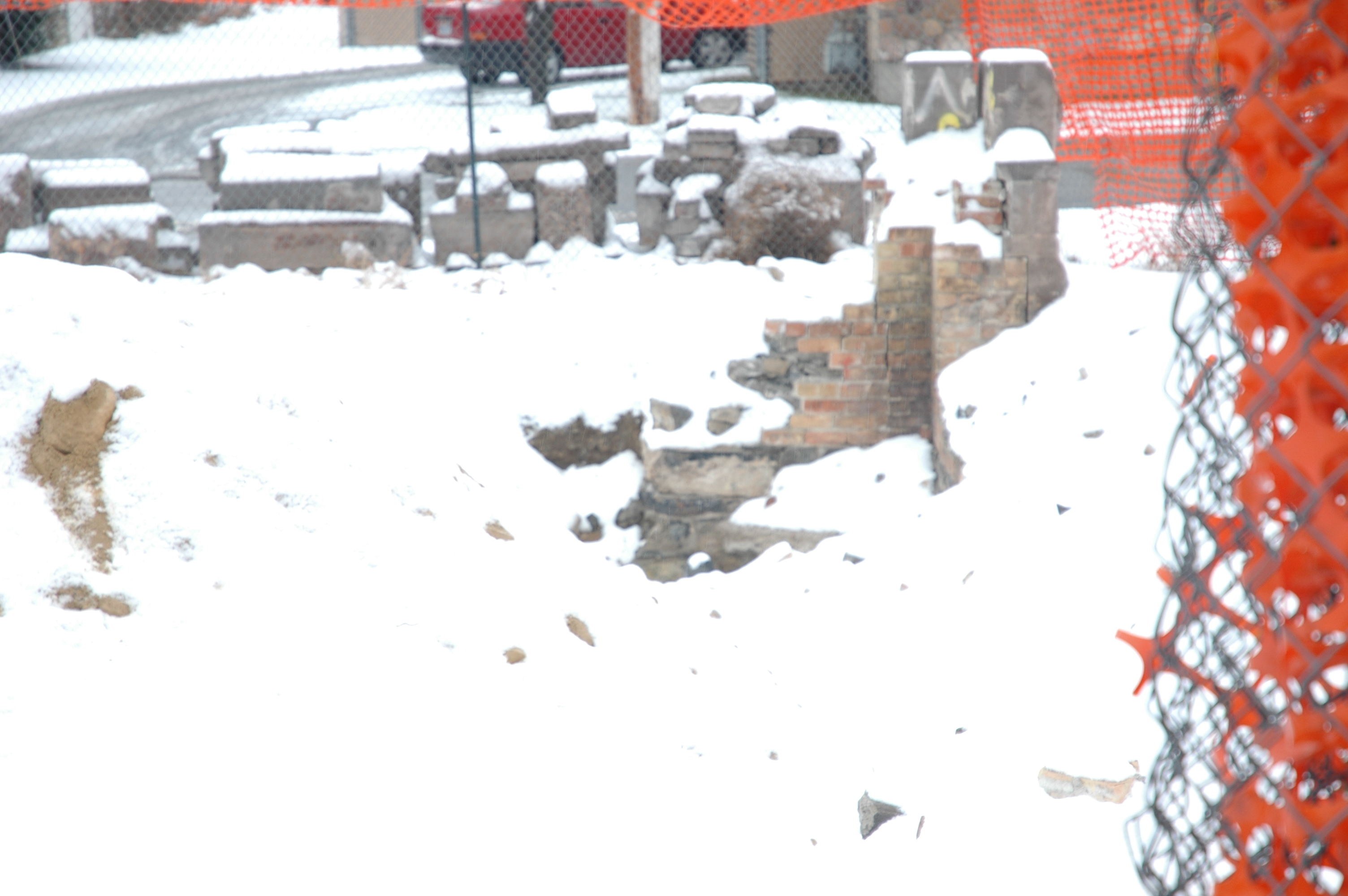
Demolished, as of December 2010

The building housed a number of other businesses in the 20th century, including Utah Sugar Company offices, a photography studio and a school. A few people even lived in a small apartment in the 1970s. After the building was vacated in 1989, it fell into severe disrepair and was the subject of many discussions by local government and preservationists. It was listed on the National Register of Historic Places in 1998. It had long been rumored to be haunted, and the owner made it into a haunted attraction for several years to try to raise money for restoration. In 2009, the Lehi City Council decided to have the building demolished due to its dangerously deteriorated condition. It was delisted from the National Register in 2018.
