= Arthur Stayner =

Sugar-beet farmer in Utah, USA (1835–1899)

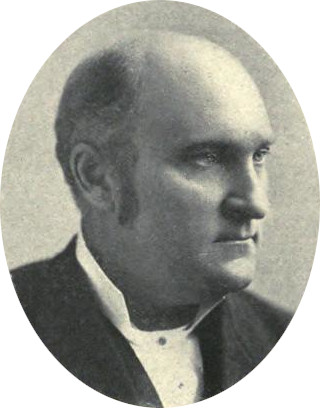
- Born: March 29, 1835; Saint Peter Port, Guernsey
- Died: September 4, 1899 (aged 64); Salt Lake City, Utah
- Known for: Sugar beet producer in Utah

Arthur Stayner (29 March 1835 – 4 September 1899) was an English horticulturist who emigrated to the United States and became important in the founding of the sugar beet industry in Utah.

== Beet sugar ==
The first entrepreneurs to try to make sugar from beets in Utah were the Mormon pioneers in the early 1850s, who used machinery shipped from Liverpool, England, but their attempts to produce granulated sugar failed because they could not overcome the problems created by growing beets in alkali soils.

Stayner studied the sugar industry in California. He was energetic and using his property, he conducted experiments with sugar cane, sorghum cane, and sugar beets in Utah. In 1887, he produced the first 7,000 pounds of commercial sugar in Utah and received a $5000 award from the legislature. With the support of the Church of Jesus Christ of Latter-day Saints (LDS Church) and other business leaders, he formed the Utah Sugar Company in 1889 with 20 stockholders. This company was ultimately instrumental in building a $400,000 beet sugar factory constructed by E. H. Dyer in 1891 at Lehi. The company was so successful that it encouraged the building of other factories in Utah and Idaho that resulted in great economic growth in the two states from the research and the manufacturing of sugars and sugar syrups.

== Death and legacy ==
Stayner became a prominent citizen of Salt Lake City. He died on 4 September 1899 from sepsis stemming from a lead pellet which became embedded in his heel. Although a physician considered amputation of his limb, the infection had permeated his body, and it was too late to save him.

Although Stayner was not interested in financial gain from sugar manufacture, because of the energetic work, he is regarded as the "father and founder of the movement that made the manufacture of sugar in Utah a success."

== See also ==
- Deseret Manufacturing Company
- Utah-Idaho Sugar Company
