= Philip DeLaMare =

Sugar-beet farmer (1823–1915)

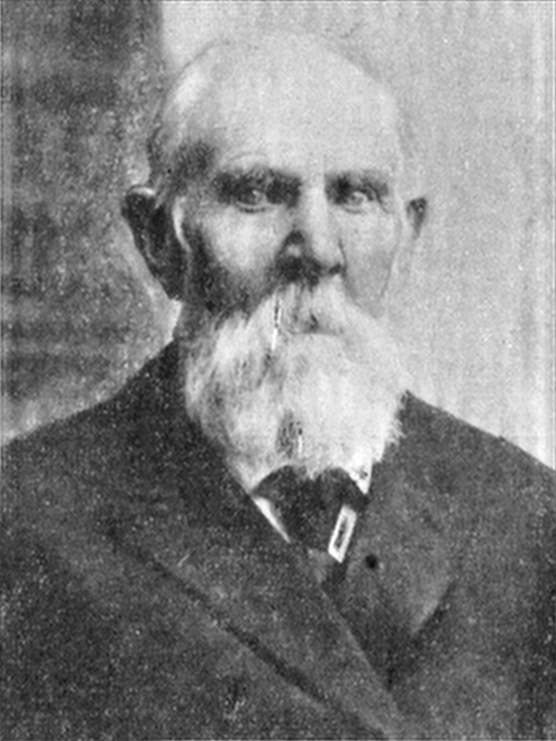

Personal details
- Born: April 3, 1823; Isle of Jersey
- Died: October 16, 1915 (aged 92); Tooele, Utah, United States
- Cause of death: Senility
- Resting place: Tooele City Cemetery; 40.5237°N 112.2955°W
- Spouse(s): Mary Parkin; Mary Chevalier; Jeanette Mickeljohn
- Children: 21
- Parents: Francis DeLaMare; Jane Esther Hier

Philip DeLaMare (alternately De La Mare; Delamare in French) (April 3, 1823 – October 16, 1915) was a convert to Mormonism who was a key figure in the attempts to introduce the sugar beet industry to Utah in the late-19th century. The modern neighborhood Sugar House, Salt Lake City is named for that trial sugar factory.

== Early life ==
DeLaMare was born on the Isle of Jersey in 1823. His parents were Francis DeLaMare and Jane Esther Hier.

== Role in founding the Sugarhouse area ==
DeLaMare converted to the Church of Jesus Christ of Latter-day Saints (LDS Church) in 1849. In 1851, while on a mission to France, DeLaMare accompanied apostle John Taylor to Arras. Arras was home to extensive beet sugar plants and DeLaMare was able to carefully study the industry and evaluate whether or not this business would work well in Utah. Taylor and DeLaMare, along with others, purchased beet sugar manufacturing supplies and imported it to America.

== The Philip DeLaMare Company ==
The sugar factory machinery was first shipped from Liverpool to St. Louis then the equipment had to be taken to Utah by wagon. This was the first beet sugar machinery ever brought to America. The company, known as the Philip De La Mare Company, left for Utah Territory on July 4, 1852 with over 80 people. They would arrive on November 10, 1852. DeLaMare led 52 teams of oxen that hauled the equipment to Salt Lake City. Some of these wagons would break down during the journey due to the heavy weight of equipment. The company also had trouble with their cattle dying and more cattle had to be brought in along the way. It is believed that parts of the intricate machinery were lost during this journey, which would later lead to problems in the factory’s attempts to produce sugar.

== The Sugar House Sugar Factory ==
On March 5, 1853, Brigham Young, Heber C. Kimball, John Taylor, Mr. Mollenhauer, Daniel H. Wells, and Amasa M. Lyman selected the southeast corner of 21st South and Highland Drive as the location for the sugar factory. This is in the part of Salt Lake City now known as "Sugar House".

Seeds were sent ahead and about 300 acres of land were planted with sugar beets. The factory began operating in February 1855. The finished factory used a water wheel in Parley’s Creek to power the factory. By the end of the summer in 1855, Brigham Young concluded the factory to be a failure and ordered it to be shut down. The factory could not produce sugar, and would only ever create molasses.

There are several theories as to why the factory could not produce sugar. It appears some parts of the factory machinery may have been lost on the journey to Utah. In the Agricultural History journal, historian Leonard Arrington theorized that the problems was with the chemical nature of the beets made them difficult to convert since they were grown in alkali soil. Another historian believed the salt content of the beets was much higher than the content of those grown in France and that this imbalance caused the problem. Others have speculated that the Sugar House factory was never able to master the crystallization method necessary for the process. It is believed that approximately $100,000 was spent in the attempt to make sugar production successful at the factory.

The factory was later used as a paper mill (which processed sunflower seeds, weeds, straw, and old rags), roundhouse, bucket and tub works, woolen factory, a machine shop for the Utah Central Railroad, coal yard office, and weighing station. The factory was completely torn down in 1928.

== See also ==
- Deseret Manufacturing Company
- Utah-Idaho Sugar Company
