= Melbourne School Bands Festival =

The Melbourne School Bands/Strings Festival was a two-week program where school bands mainly from metropolitan Melbourne, Australia, as well as country Victoria and interstate, gather to perform, listen and participate in tutorials. The Festival has an education focus. All ensembles receive either a Gold, Silver, Bronze, Merit or Participation shield. The Melbourne School Band festival is the brain child of Barry Croll and Douglas Heywood who created the idea and event under the Music Junction Blackburn Banner in 1989 to support the ongoing development of music education in schools. The festival was produced and sponsored by Billy Hyde Music Foundation, until their parent company Billy Hyde went into liquidation in 2012.

In 2008, the Festival's 20th anniversary, over 300 concert bands, jazz ensembles and string ensembles performed at the Robert Blackwood Concert Hall and School of Music Auditorium, Monash University. Since the inception of the festival in 1989 the number of students electing to learn an instrument through their school music program has increased substantially. The festival is now one of Australia's most prestigious musical events for school musicians.

The festival is designed to support and develop instrumental music education. Not only do students have the opportunity to perform at Australia's finest venues (acoustic-wise), but they receive adjudication from an outstanding panel of adjudicators.

The festival runs for two weeks until the Festival Finale on the last Saturday of August. The Finale showcases the most outstanding ensembles from the Festival and features the distribution of the awards.

In late 2012, Allans Billy Hyde music stores went into liquidation and the Billy Hyde Foundation now ceases to exist. While select Allans Billy Hyde stores live on through a new owner the Melbourne School Bands Festival's fate is unknown.

== Ensemble categories ==
=== Concert Bands ===
- Training Concert Band
- Novice Concert Band
- Junior Concert Band
- Intermediate Concert Band
- Symphonic Band

=== Jazz Ensembles ===
- Junior Jazz Ensemble
- Intermediate Jazz Ensemble
- Senior Jazz Ensemble

=== String Ensembles ===
- Beginner String Group
- Junior String Orchestra
- Senior String Orchestra
- Symphony Orchestra
- String Ensemble

== Chief Adjudicators ==
=== Concert Bands ===
- 1989: Col. John Bourgeois, United States Marine Band, USA
- 1990: Col. John Bourgeois, United States Marine Band, USA
- 1991: Dr. Wayne Bennet, University of Oregon, USA
- 1992: James Swearingen, Composer, USA
- 1993: Col. John Bourgeois, United States Marine Band, USA
- 1994: Dr. Francis McBeth, Ouachita University, Arkansas, USA
- 1995: Dr. Barry Kopetz, University of Utah, USA
- 1996: Dr. Barry Kopetz, University of Utah, USA
- 1997: Ed Huckeby, Composer, USA
- 1998: Dr. Ben Hawkins, Transylvania University, Kentucky, USA
- 1999: Ms. Paula A Crider, The University of Texas, USA
- 2000: Dr. Rob McWilliams, University of Wisconsin, Oshkosh, USA
- 2001: Mr. Richard L Floyd, University of Texas, Austin, USA
- 2002: Mr. Robert W Smith, Composer, USA
- 2003: Mr. Ken Waterworth, Australia
- 2004: Mr. John M Laverty, Syracause University, USA
- 2005: Ms. Paula A Crider, The University of Texas, USA
- 2006: Mr. Thomas V Fraschillo, University of Southern Mississippi, USA
- 2007: Mr. Jeff King, USA
- 2008: Mr. Don Wilcox, West Virginia University (ret.), USA

=== Jazz Ensembles ===
- 1997: Mr. Gil Askey, USA
- 1998: Mr. Jeff Jervis, USA
- 1999: Mr. Doug Beach, Elmhurst College, Illinois, USA
- 2000: Mr. Daryl McKenzie, Australia
- 2001: Mr. Reg Walsh, Australia
- 2002: Mr. Patrick Crichton, WAAPA, Australia
- 2003: Mr. J Richard Dunscombe, Composer, USA
- 2004: Mr. Monte H Mumford, Australia
- 2005: Mr. Steve Newcomb, Australia
- 2006: Mr. Dean Sorenson, University of Minnesota, USA
- 2007: Mr. Victor Lopez, USA
- 2008: Mr. Brad Millard, Queensland University of Technology, Australia

=== String Ensembles ===
- 2000: Mr. Michael Loughlin, Australia
- 2001: Mr. Willem van der Vis, Australia
- 2002: Ms. Andrea Keeble, Australia
- 2003: Mr. Peter Bandy, Australia
- 2004: Ms. Christine Belshaw, Australia
- 2005: Mr. Mark Drummond, Australia
- 2006: Ms. Kim Waldock, Australia
- 2007: Ms. Loreta Fin, Australia
- 2008: Mr. Malcolm Yuen, Australia
