= Salt Lake Symphonic Winds =

The Salt Lake Symphonic Winds is a community concert band in Salt Lake City, Utah that plays contemporary band music. Its membership consists largely of music educators and amateur musicians throughout the Wasatch Front and Cache County, Utah.

Dr. Thomas Rohrer, director of bands at Utah State University, has served as the band's conductor since 2005.

== Organization ==
The band is funded in large part by Salt Lake County's Zoo, Arts, and Parks (ZAP) tax, plus several grants through other organizations for the arts. It is incorporated as a non-profit performing organization under the laws of the State of Utah, governed by a board of trustees and administered by a president, a president-elect, a secretary, and a treasurer.

The band typically performs six concerts a year from October through April, plus a special summer performance at the Independence Day celebration in Sugar House Park.

=== History ===
The Salt Lake Symphonic Winds was founded in 1992 by Dr. Barry Kopetz of the University of Utah, who served as the organization's first conductor until departure in 2002 to serve as the director of bands at Capital University in Columbus, Ohio. Scott Hagen, Director of Bands at the University of Utah, took the role as the conductor until 2004.

== Ensemble ==
=== Seating ===
The organization follows a standard American wind band, including brass, woodwinds, and percussion, plus one string bass.

=== Membership ===
The membership of the Salt Lake Symphonic Winds is limited by audition. The band conducts weekly rehearsals at Highland High School of Salt Lake City, Utah. Many are music educators from the Wasatch Front, including Highland High School, Mueller Park Jr. High, Kaysville Jr. High, Hillcrest Jr. High, Alta High School, University of Utah, and Utah State University.

== Repertoire ==
The band performs contemporary and classical band compositions and arrangements. Some of the notable composers and arrangers include:

- Robert Russell Bennett
- Frederick Fennell
- Henry Fillmore
- Morton Gould
- Percy Grainger
- Gustav Holst
- W. Francis McBeth
- Vincent Persichetti
- Alfred Reed
- John Philip Sousa
- Frank Ticheli
- Ralph Vaughan Williams
