= Deseret Manufacturing Company =

Former Mormon sugar beet processing company

- Industry: Sugar beet processing
- Founded: 1851; 175 years ago
- Founders: John Taylor; John W. Coward; Joseph Russell; Philip DeLaMare
- Defunct: 1853
- Key people: Brigham Young
- Parent: The Church of Jesus Christ of Latter-day Saints

The Deseret Manufacturing Company (/ˌdɛzəˈrɛt/) was an unsuccessful venture by the Church of Jesus Christ of Latter-day Saints in the 1850s to process sugar beets into refined sugar. A test factory was established in an area that is now known as Sugar House, Utah.

== Background ==
Freighting sugar to the Utah Territory from the Missouri River Valley cost between forty cents and one dollar per pound, so the Church of Jesus Christ of Latter-day Saints was interested in the sugar beet industry since 1850 as a cash crop for the Mormon settlers. The First Presidency of the Church even issued a statement in September 1850, calculating the amount of sugar necessary in the region and echoing nutritional information that was believed at the time. John Taylor served as a missionary in France, and did research at a sugar beet factory in Pas-de-Calais.

== Company formation ==
In 1851, the LDS Church attempted developing the industry in Utah in an official manner through Brigham Young and John Taylor, establishing the Deseret Manufacturing Company in Spring 1851 between Taylor, John W. Coward, Joseph Russell, and Philip DeLaMare with $35,000 in capital from the LDS church. The machinery was purchased from Faucett, Preston and Company of Liverpool, leaving on March 6, 1852 and arriving in New Orleans on April 26, 1852 via the Rockaway. The equipment was boated to Leavenworth, Kansas, then by 40 high-end covered wagons to Utah. Troubles with transportation, including heavy snows, caused the company to be nicknamed the "Damn Miserable Company". Some of the equipment was abandoned in the Bear River Valley of Utah, and the original Provo factory location was abandoned by late November 1852. Instead, the machinery was set up in Salt Lake City for a test run in an adobe-construction blacksmith shop. The community it was established in is now known as Sugarhouse, and the test factory ready for first processing by December 20, 1852.

Brigham Young thought John Taylor was a poor businessman, declaring he "knew nothing about transacting business." Young, despite no knowledge of sugar beets or sugar, took over the business. The 1852 effort was a failure, partly because the important vacuum pan never worked correctly, and partly because of a lack of knowledge about the industry. The Deseret Manufacturing Company was out of money, and the LDS church assumed the debts in February or March 1853. Taylor, DeLaMare, and Mollenhauer, the only people who had seen a successful sugar operation, left the company after the takeover. Philip DeLaMare later stated:

When the plant was started in the fall of 1852 what machinery was used ran alright and filled every reasonable expectation. The beets, however, had been grown on the lowlands, and the juice was filled with mineral and was dark. When we started, the first thing that Mr. Mollenhauer called for were the retorts, but we soon discovered we had no retorts. That important part of sugar-making machinery had never been ordered as they were not in the plans that were given by the Arras Company to use. Mr. Mollenhauer had supposed all the time they had come along with the machinery … These retorts were the cast iron ovens wherein bones were burned to make the animal charcoal that had to be used to clarify and purify the juice of the beet before it could be granulated and made into sugar. This was a fatal mishap and that settled the matter for that season as far as sugar-making was concerned … Mr. Mollenhauer and myself gathered a few bones together and burned them in a charcoal pit, and from the few bones we burned we clarified several bottles of black beet syrup until it was clear as crystal; and satisfied ourselves that the sugar could be made, and all that was needed was an abundance of animal clarifying matter. Had we secured that, Utah would have made beet sugar twenty years ahead of any other part of the United States.

== The full factory ==
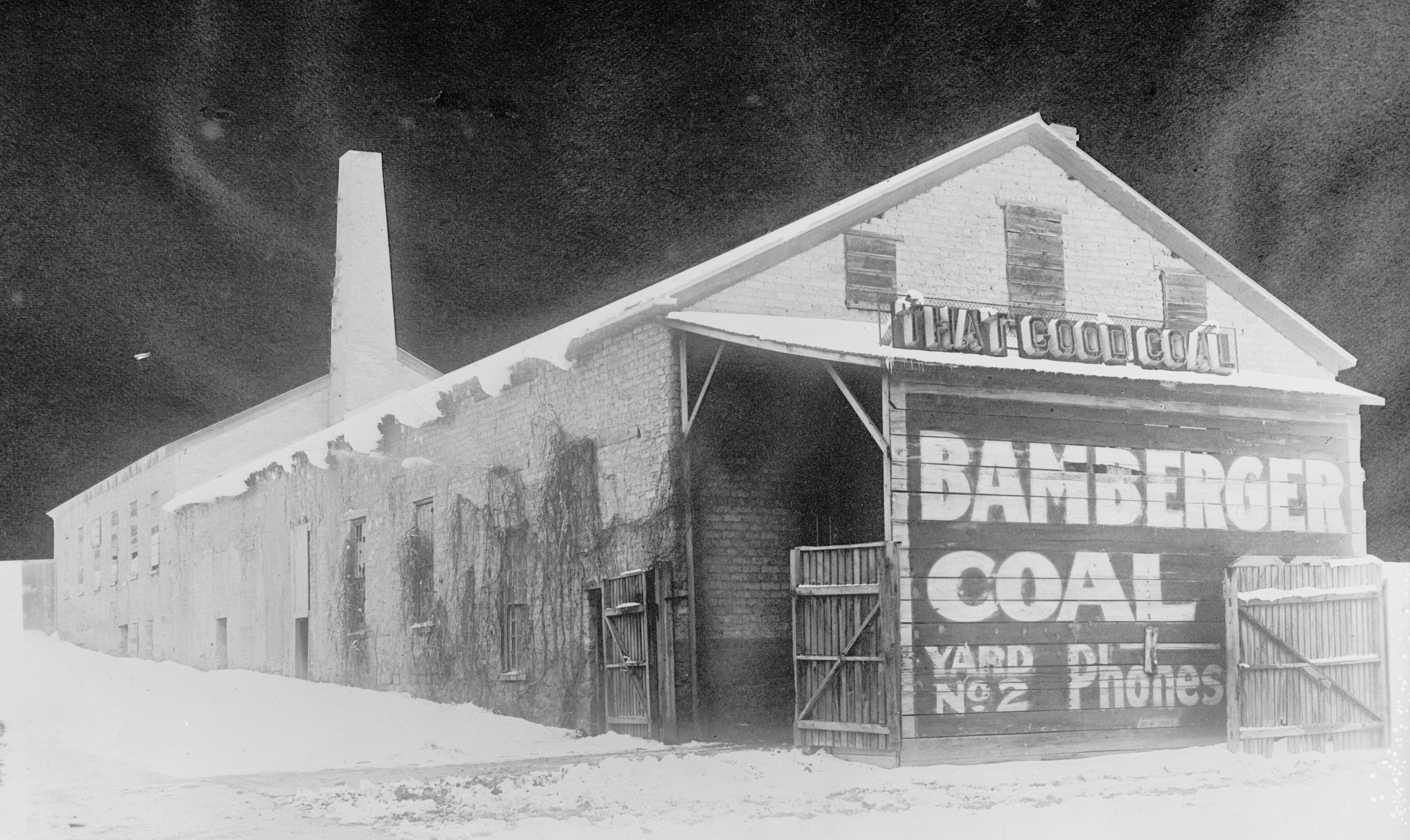
The sugar factory, when the building was later used by Bamberger Coal

In 1853, a full factory was designed by Truman O. Angell, who was called by Young. A. O. Smoot, the first bishop of the Sugar House ward, directed construction. The project was plagued with delays, in part due to labor and construction materials being needed for construction of the nearby Salt Lake Temple. The factory was scheduled for completion in the fall of 1854, but did not start processing sugar beets until February 1, 1855. The factory ran until March 17, 1855, but didn't successfully produce sugar.

The operation closed in fall 1856, never having been successful, though the Church still believed it could be made successful. Later research proved the equipment was manufactured correctly, installed correctly, and similar to later successful factories; the difference was the lack of experienced operators, especially for boiling sugar in the vacuum pan. The two missing steps were an inadequate speed on the vacuum pump, and a missing graining step to produce sugar crystals. The operation was also likely abandoned due to the declining finances of the LDS Church and the Utah War of 1857, as well as Young's poor ability to handle criticism.

== Legacy ==
The expensive equipment, acquired and shipped to Utah at great cost, was reused in other industries around Utah. These industries included a woolen mill owned by Young, Thomas Howard's paper manufacturing, and book binding at the Deseret News. In the end, the operation was a $50,000 loss.

The concern of supplying sugar to the region was still under discussion. In 1863, Young stated "Importing sugar has been a great drain upon our ... currency. I am satisfied that it is altogether unnecessary to purchase sugar in a foreign market." After years of experimenting with sorghum and deciding sugar beets would work better, Arthur Stayner lobbied the LDS church in 1887, but the church was not interested, due to poor church finances and a committee of the church-owned ZCMI reporting such a venture would be a bad idea. By 1889, Arthur Stayner and Elias Morris were able to win over Wilford Woodruff to the idea of growing and processing sugar beets, leading to a new enterprise, the Utah-Idaho Sugar Company.
