= Theodore Whitmarsh =

American businessman and politician (1869–1936)

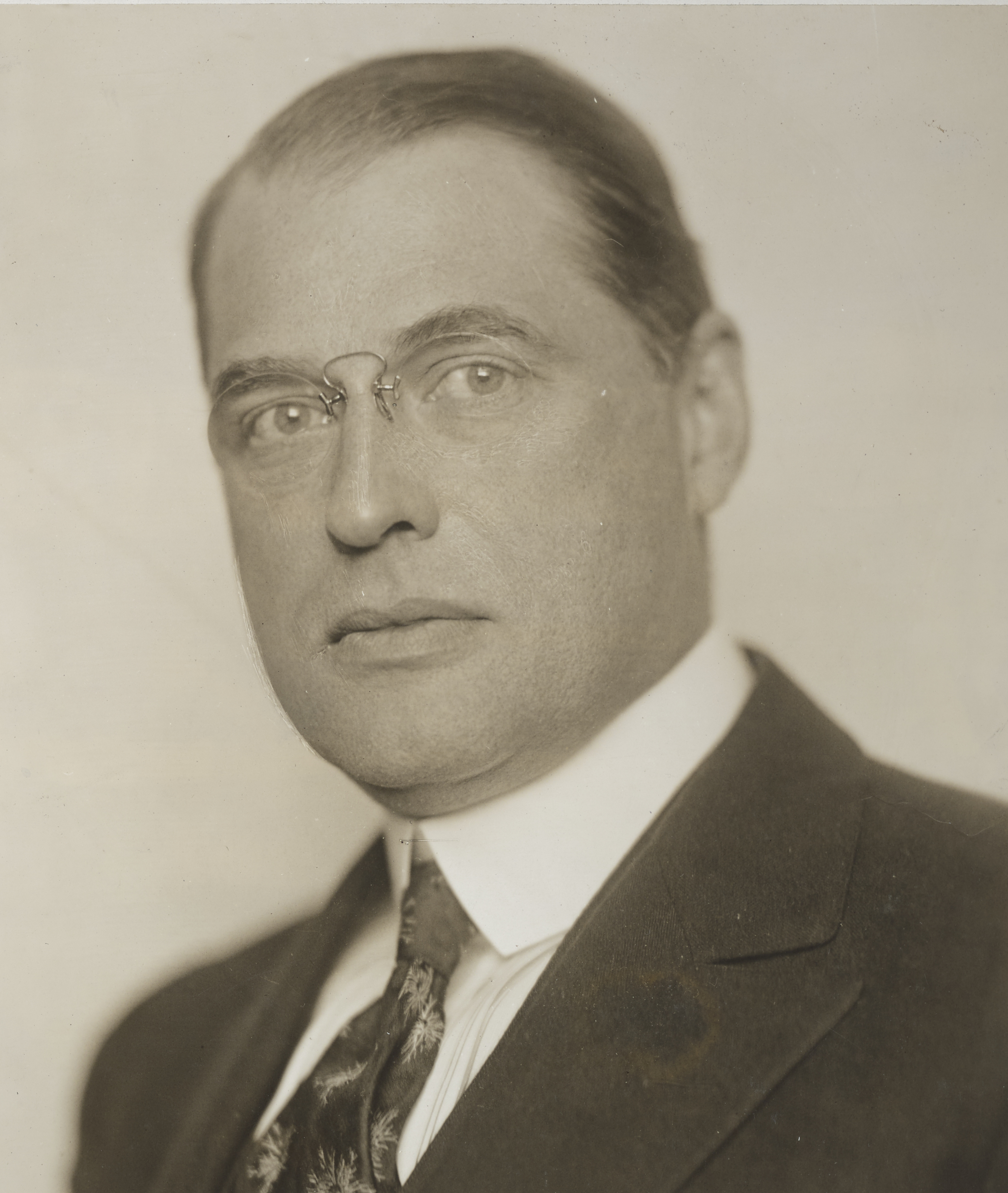
- Portrait of Whitmarsh, c. 1917–1918

Director of the Federal Reserve Bank of New York
- In office January 1, 1924 – December 31, 1932
- Preceded by: Richard H. Williams
- Succeeded by: Walter C. Teagle

Joint U.S. Director of the American Relief Administration
- In office March 2, 1919 – July 1, 1919
- President: Woodrow Wilson
- Preceded by: Office established
- Succeeded by: Office abolished

Acting Administrator of the United States Food Administration
- In office January 16, 1919 – February 25, 1919
- President: Woodrow Wilson
- Preceded by: Herbert Hoover (as Administrator)
- Succeeded by: Office abolished

Personal details
- Born: Theodore Francis Whitmarsh; November 6, 1869 Brooklyn, New York, US
- Died: May 12, 1936 (aged 66) New York City
- Resting place: Sleepy Hollow Cemetery
- Party: Republican
- Spouse: Lillian Ainslie Smith (m. 1893)
- Children: 3
- Profession: Politician, businessman

Theodore Francis Whitmarsh (November 6, 1869 – May 12, 1936) was an American businessman and politician. Whitmarsh was active across several industries, including grocery, finance, and manufacturing. During World War I and in its immediate aftermath, Whitmarsh held a variety of posts in the U.S. federal government, most notably as the acting administrator of the United States Food Administration, member of the War Industries Board, and joint director of the American Relief Administration. Whitmarsh was later elected as a director of the Federal Reserve Bank of New York, serving eight years in the role.

== Early life and family ==
Whitmarsh was born in Brooklyn, New York on November 6, 1869, to Caroline H. (née Leggett) and Henry C. Whitmarsh. He was educated in public schools. In 1893, Whitmarsh married Lillian Ainslie Smith. They had three children.

== Career ==
=== Private sector ===
In 1886, Whitmarsh began working for his uncle Francis Howard Leggett (1840–1909), who was a prominent wholesale grocer and the owner of Francis H. Leggett & Co. In 1896, he became a member of the firm. In 1902, he became the vice president and treasurer of the firm. After the death of his uncle in 1909, Whitmarsh assumed control of the business as president. Whitmarsh remained as chairman of the board of the company for the rest of his life.

Other business holdings of Whitmarsh included serving as president and treasurer of the Seacoast Canning Company and as treasurer of the American Can Company. Whitmarsh was the member of corporate boards including the Irving National Bank, Irving Trust Company, Famous Players–Lasky, Greenwich Savings Bank, Audley Clarke Company, Straclar Holding Corporation, New York Mercantile Exchange, and the United States Chamber of Commerce.

From 1915 to 1918, Whitmarsh was the president of the National Wholesale Grocers Association of the United States. Whitmarsh was also the chairman and a longtime fundraiser for the United Hospital Fund, raising US$300,000 for the organization in 1929 and over US$500,000 in 1932. Whitmarsh was also a close acquaintance of Swami Vivekananda, and drew up a trust fund for handling the administration and proceeds from his book sales.

=== Public service ===
A Republican, Whitmarsh was active in New York politics. In June 1917, Whitmarsh was appointed as the chief of the Distribution Division of the newly formed United States Food Administration. In the role, he served as special assistant to Herbert Hoover, who was then serving as the director of the agency. While in the role, Whitmarsh was a member of the War Industries Board, the Priorities Committee, the Requirements Committee, and the Belgian Relief Committee. He was also the vice president, treasurer, and a board member of the U.S. Sugar Equalization Board. In 1917, Whitmarsh was described as the person who is "seeing that the whole country gets a square deal on passing around the food."

After Hoover departed for Europe in November 1918, Whitmarsh served as acting chairman of the Committee for European Food Relief, and as acting chairman of the United States Food Administration's executive committee. President Woodrow Wilson appointed Whitmarsh as acting administrator of the agency in Hoover's absence.

In 1919, Whitmarsh served as U.S. joint director of the American Relief Administration. That summer, Whitmarsh spent two months in Europe working on post-war food provision issues. In 1923, Whitmarsh was elected as a Class B director of the Federal Reserve Bank of New York. Whitmarsh served in the role from 1924 until 1932.

== Awards and honors ==
In 1918, King Albert I of Belgium awarded Whitmarsh as an Officer of the Order of the Crown for his work in Europe. In 1933, Whitmarsh was a dinner guest of President Hoover at the White House.

== Death ==
Whitmarsh died of pneumonia at New York Hospital on May 12, 1936, aged 66. His funeral at Saint Thomas Church was attended by 1,500 people. Whitmarsh's honorary pallbearers included George L. Harrison, Gates W. McGarrah, Walter C. Teagle, and Owen D. Young. He is interred at Sleepy Hollow Cemetery in Westchester County, New York.
