= Waverly, Washington =

- Town
- Location of Waverly, Washington
- Coordinates: 47°20′17″N 117°13′52″W
- Country: United States
- State: Washington
- County: Spokane

Government
  - Type: Mayor–council
  - Mayor: Paul Curtis

Area
  - Total: 0.41 sq mi (1.07 km^{2})
  - Land: 0.41 sq mi (1.07 km^{2})
  - Water: 0 sq mi (0.00 km^{2})
- Elevation: 2,536 ft (773 m)

Population (2020)
  - Total: 121
  - Density: 293/sq mi (113/km^{2})
- Time zone: UTC-8 (Pacific (PST))
  - Summer (DST): UTC-7 (PDT)
- ZIP code: 99039
- Area code: 509
- FIPS code: 53-76720
- GNIS feature ID: 2413458

Waverly is a town in Spokane County, Washington, United States. The population was 121 at the 2020 census.

== History ==
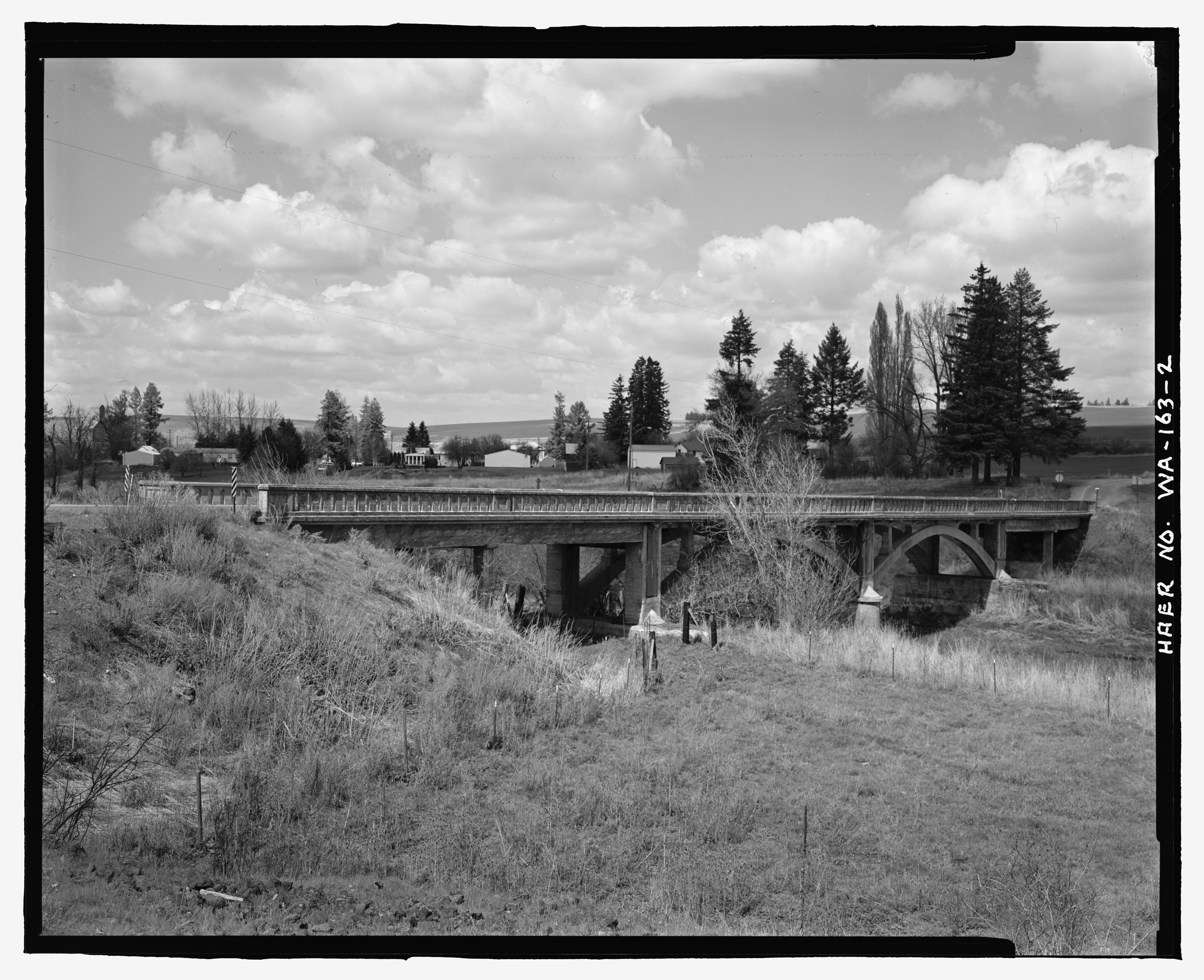
The Latah Creek Bridge and the Town of Waverly, pre-1968

Waverly was settled by white immigrants as early as 1878, and was named by two settlers after Waverly, Iowa in 1879. The following year the community received a post office at the residence of A.D. Thayer on Hangman Creek (now Latah Creek), where it remained for five years.

In 1884 P. Gimble opened the town's first business, a general store, which was followed by a station for a new branch of the Oregon Railroad & Navigation Company, and warehouses built by the Spokane Grain & Milling Company and the Pacific Coast Elevator Company.

In December 1899 a beet sugar factory built by the Washington State Beet Sugar Company opened. It cost $500,000 to build, included a 1,400 acres (570 ha) farm, and could process 350 short tons (320 t) per day. It was considered unprofitable and inferior. Thomas R. Cutler and the Utah Sugar Company advised the factory, based on their success with the Lehi, Utah factory. The factory closed in 1910 and eventually sold to the Gunnison Sugar Company for $100,000. The equipment was installed in Centerfield, Utah in 1917. The beet sugar company employed 150 workers in the factory, and up to 400 workers in the beet fields during harvest time. Additionally, the town included a hardware store, jewelry store, harness shop, meat market, millinery, two hotels, two restaurants, a livery stable, barber shop, furniture store, and two saloons. Waverly was officially incorporated on May 15, 1907.

== Geography ==
According to the United States Census Bureau, the town has a total area of 0.41 square miles (1.06 km^{2}), all of it land.

== Demographics ==
Historical population
Census	Pop.	Note	%±
1910	318		—
1920	234		−26.4%
1930	151		−35.5%
1940	131		−13.2%
1950	120		−8.4%
1960	108		−10.0%
1970	48		−55.6%
1980	99		106.3%
1990	37		−62.6%
2000	121		227.0%
2010	106		−12.4%
2020	121		14.2%
U.S. Decennial Census; 2018 Estimate

=== 2010 census ===
As of the 2010 census, there were 106 people, 44 households, and 28 families living in the town. The population density was 258.5 inhabitants per square mile (99.8/km^{2}). There were 50 housing units at an average density of 122.0 per square mile (47.1/km^{2}). The racial makeup of the town was 97.2% White, 0.9% Native American, and 1.9% from two or more races. Hispanic or Latino of any race were 0.9% of the population.

There were 44 households, of which 27.3% had children under the age of 18 living with them, 59.1% were married couples living together, 4.5% had a female householder with no husband present, and 36.4% were non-families. 31.8% of all households were made up of individuals, and 6.8% had someone living alone who was 65 years of age or older. The average household size was 2.41 and the average family size was 3.11.

The median age in the town was 40.7 years. 27.4% of residents were under the age of 18; 5.5% were between the ages of 18 and 24; 20.8% were from 25 to 44; 37.7% were from 45 to 64; and 8.5% were 65 years of age or older. The gender makeup of the town was 53.8% male and 46.2% female.

=== 2000 census ===
As of the 2000 census, there were 121 people, 46 households, and 31 families living in the town. The population density was 299.1 people per square mile (116.8/km^{2}). There were 49 housing units at an average density of 121.1 per square mile (47.3/km^{2}). The racial makeup of the town was 95.87% White, 2.48% Native American, and 1.65% from two or more races.

There were 46 households, out of which 41.3% had children under the age of 18 living with them, 60.9% were married couples living together, 2.2% had a female householder with no husband present, and 32.6% were non-families. 28.3% of all households were made up of individuals, and 6.5% had someone living alone who was 65 years of age or older. The average household size was 2.63 and the average family size was 3.29.

In the town, the age distribution of the population shows 30.6% under the age of 18, 4.1% from 18 to 24, 32.2% from 25 to 44, 23.1% from 45 to 64, and 9.9% who were 65 years of age or older. The median age was 36 years. For every 100 females, there were 101.7 males. For every 100 females age 18 and over, there were 100.0 males.

The median income for a household in the town was $38,125, and the median income for a family was $43,750. Males had a median income of $31,042 versus $20,625 for females. The per capita income for the town was $15,072. There were 5.9% of families and 8.4% of the population living below the poverty line, including 14.6% of under eighteens and none of those over 64.
