= Sugar Shack (disambiguation) =

A sugar shack is a cabin used to boil sap from sugar maple trees into maple syrup.

Sugar Shack, The Sugar Shack, and other variations of that phrase may refer to:

- "Sugar Shack", a 1962 song written by Keith McCormack and recorded by Jimmy Gilmer and the Fireballs
- "The Sugar Shack", a 1971 painting by Ernie Barnes, known for being featured on the cover of the 1976 Marvin Gaye album I Want You and also in the television series Good Times
- "Sugar Shack", a 2019 song by Beth Hart from the album War in My Mind

== See also ==
- Sugar House (disambiguation)
