= E. H. Dyer =

American businessman

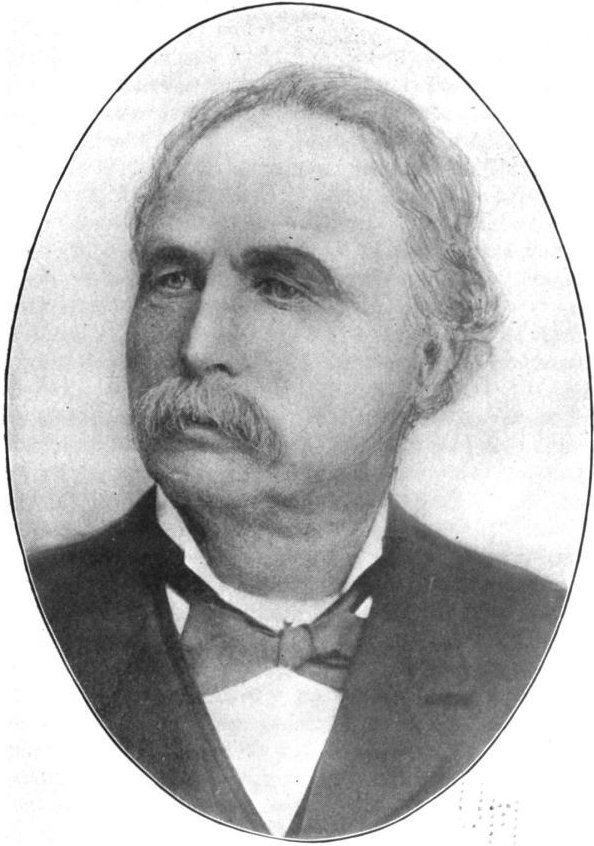
E. H. Dyer

Ebenezer Herrick Dyer (April 17, 1822 – July 15, 1910) was an American businessman who established the first successful commercial beet sugar mill in the U.S., and as such, was called the "father of the American beet sugar industry".

Dyer was born in Sullivan, Maine; his family was one of the original colonists of New England. Unlike his brother Ephraim who was drawn by the California Gold Rush, Dyer stayed in Maine when the number of immigrants to California skyrocketed. However, Ephraim needed help running a farm and asked his brother to join him. Dyer had previously run lumber and quarry companies, and as an 1883 biography states, "Seeking a wider field he came to California." He arrived in 1857 and determining that the situation was favorable, returned to Maine for his wife Marion Wallace Ingalls, whom he had married in 1850, and two children. Returning in April 1858, they settled on Ephraim's farm in Alvarado (now part of Union City). After his wife died in 1863, Dyer married Olive Ingalls, his former sister-in-law. In total, he had six children, three sons and three daughters, three from each of the sisters.

In 1859 he was elected County Surveyor of Alameda County and re-elected two years later. Also, that same year he was appointed United States Deputy Surveyor by Surveyor General E.F. Beale, and he served in that position for about ten years. In 1876 he was chosen by the Second Congressional District of California as a delegate to the 1876 Republican National Convention at Cincinnati, Ohio.

Meanwhile, Dyer noticed that much of America's sugar was imported from abroad. Although several sugar beet mills had been established in the U.S., none of the ventures could remain in business for more than a few years. Dyer felt that with proper management, something he had experience in, a sugar company should be able to succeed. To determine if the land was suitable for growing sugar beets, he ordered seeds from Germany to plant on his farm. To his delight, he found the plants to thrive in California.

These experiments attracted the attention of the owners of one of those failed companies, a pair of Germans named A. Otto and A. D. Bonesteel, who had left sugar beet processing jobs in their home country to try to establish a sugar beet industry in the U.S. The Dyers, the Germans, and some other partners formed the California Beet Sugar Company. The Germans, who were tapped to manage the mill's operation based on their previous experience, turned out to be less than competent, and the enterprise failed. In 1873, Bonesteel and Otto moved to try their luck in Soquel, but they proved to be unsuccessful yet again.

Undeterred, Dyer purchased the Sacramento Beet Sugar Company, located near Sacramento, California; this attempt also was ultimately a failure. Dyer persisted and, in 1879, finally found the right formula when he returned to Alvarado and formed the Standard Sugar Manufacturing Company. Still, in 1886 the company was forced to close, not due to poor business, but after a boiler exploded, causing the death of a firefighter. Dyer liquidated the stock and reorganized the company as the Pacific Coast Sugar Company. Three years later, the business was sold to the Alameda Sugar Company.

Dyer continued to be in the sugar business, however. He and his son Edward, who was a chemist and mechanical draftsman, toured sugar beet factories in Germany and brought back ideas to improve their existing facilities as well as for his next project, designing the factory for the newly incorporated Utah Sugar Company in Lehi, Utah. He retired in the 1890s and died in 1906.

The street on which the California Beet Sugar Company was located in Union City is named after Dyer, as is a street in Santa Ana, California.
