= Sugar House, Salt Lake City =

Neighborhood in Salt Lake City, Utah

Coordinates: 40.725384°N 111.859618°W

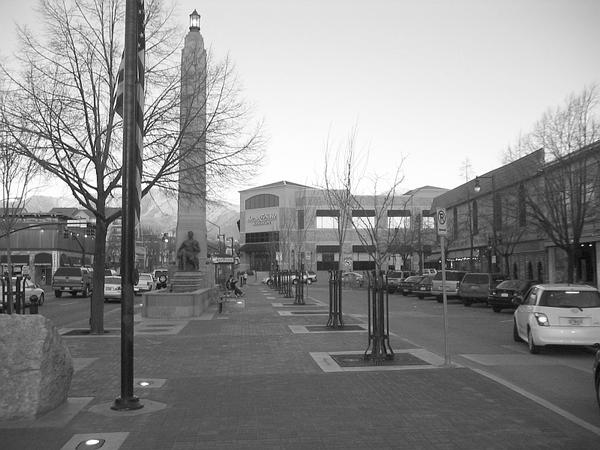
Sugar House area

Sugar House is a neighborhood in Salt Lake City, Utah. The name is officially two words, although it is often colloquially written as "Sugarhouse." As a primary commercial and residential hub of the region, it is often referred to as Salt Lake's "Second Downtown." Once a primarily residential area with a suburban-style retail hub, the neighborhood has transformed in recent years as mid-rise offices, residential blocks, and hotels have been constructed in the vicinity of Sugar House Park.

Sugar House is the site of Westminster University.

== Overview ==
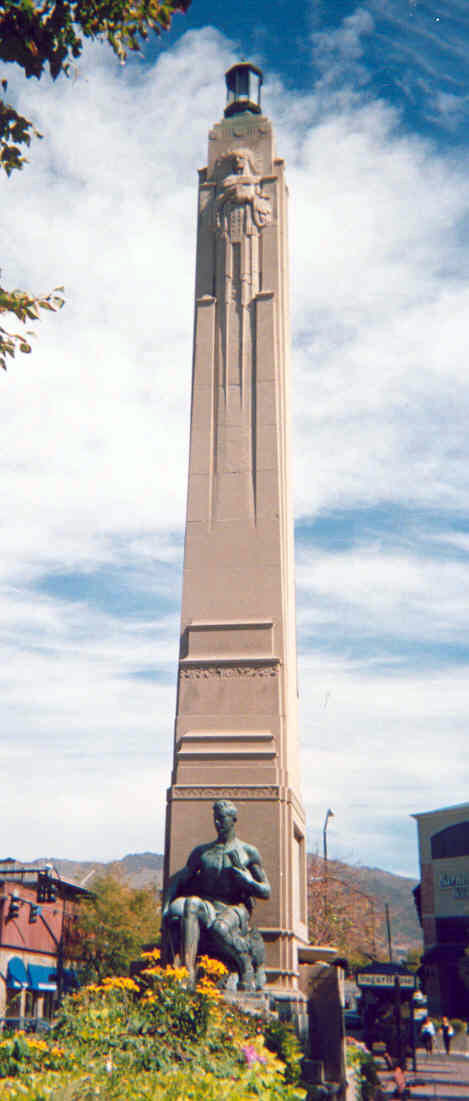
Sugar House Monument obelisk in the center of Sugar House

Sugar House is home to two shopping centers that collectively feature various retailers, several fast food and family restaurants, and a luxury seating cinema. A strip mall is located on the corner of 2100 South and 700 East. The corner of 2100 South and 1300 East features three low-rise office buildings. Between the shopping center and 2100 South is a small park named Hidden Hollow Natural Area with a daylighted portion of Parley's Creek, protected by a conservation easement in 2000 as a project to beautify the city in preparation for the 2002 Winter Olympics. It was rehabilitated based on the initiative of school children from Hawthorne Elementary School.

Sugar House Park is located between I-80, 2100 South, 1300 East, and 1700 East. The park was host to a large celebration with fireworks each July 4, but it was discontinued in 2018 due to cost, environmental concerns, and staffing shortages.

== Location ==
Sugar House is located within the Salt Lake City grid system. According to the Sugar House community council, it runs from 500 East to Foothill Drive and north to south from 1300 South to the city limits about 3000 South. According to Salt Lake City’s master plan, it runs from 500 East to Parleys Way and 2000 East and from 1700 South to the city limits about 3000 South. Many local businesses as well as private residences, although not strictly located within the bounds of Sugar House, use the name because of the area's name recognition. The business and commercial center of the neighborhood is located at 1100 East 2100 South which is also the northern end terminus of Highland Drive, where it turns into 1100 East.

In the past, the Sugar House community council had mostly shunned big-box stores, and a cluster of curbside businesses existed along the intersection of 2100 South and Highland Drive/1100 East, including independent clothing and shoe stores, music shops, artist studios, public art galleries, two coffee shops, a head shop called Wizards & Dreams, and an adult interest store called Blue Boutique. However, recent redevelopment of the Granite Block have forced many of these stores to either relocate or close. Zoning changes have created concerns that the new development will be less friendly to local businesses.

Downtown Sugar House, as seen from Parleys Canyon

== History ==
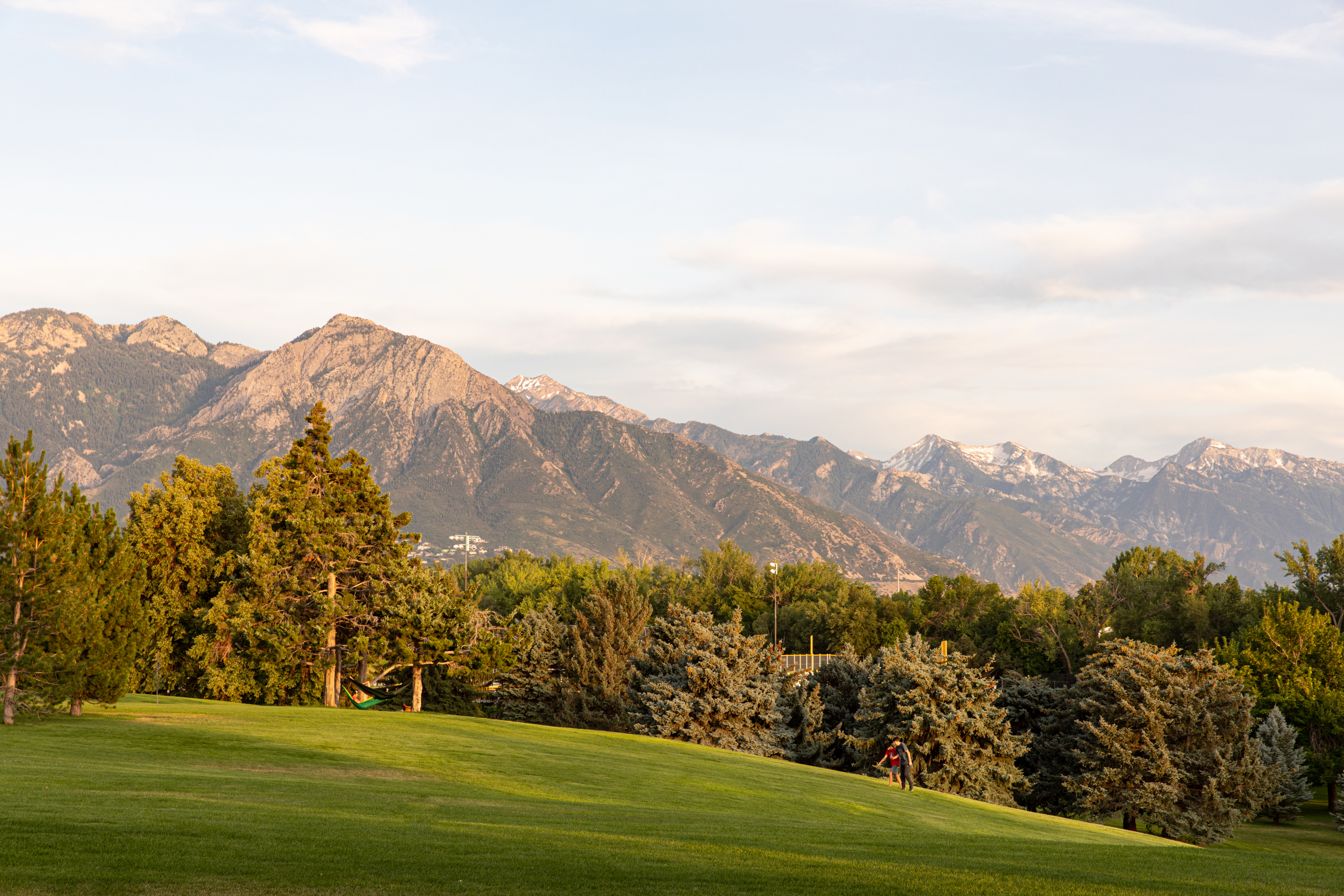
Sugar House Park

Sugar House was established in 1853, six years after Brigham Young led the Latter-Day Saint settlers into the valley. Its name derives from the sugar beet test factory of the Deseret Manufacturing Company, which was established in a former blacksmith shop in the area with the assistance of Jersey-born convert Philip DeLaMare. The name came as a suggestion from Margaret McMeans Smoot, the wife of then mayor of Salt Lake City, Abraham O. Smoot.

Sugar House Prison, the first Utah state prison, was located in Sugar House during the 19th century and early 20th century. The prison was closed in 1951 and moved to Draper. All of the buildings were torn down and the land was converted into Sugar House Park and Highland High School. In 1928, at the dedication ceremony of the Sprague Library, Mayor John F. Bowman suggested Sugar House from then on be referred to as "South East Salt Lake City." This suggestion was rejected.

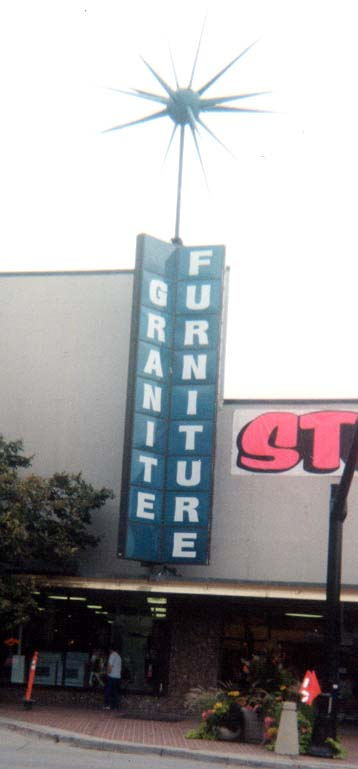
Revolving Granite Furniture sign, Sugar House

In the early 20th century, the corner of 1100 East and 2100 South was known as "furniture row" because three furniture stores were located there. Two have closed and one, Sterling Furniture, remains. Rockwood Furniture closed its doors in 1999 and Granite Furniture closed its Sugar House location in 2004, after more than 80 years of operation.

In 1990, the Sugar House Center shopping center was completed. This brought large national chains to the area for the first time. In 1998 The Commons, a shopping center located just east of the town center ("Granite Block") and adjacent to the "Sugar House Center", was constructed in response to low patronage and has since been the target of both praise and criticism.

Efforts began to establish a vintage style rail trolley to connect the Sugar House Business District to the TRAX station on 2100 South in South Salt Lake. In December 2006 the Utah Transit Authority, Salt Lake City, and South Salt Lake commissioned a Transportation Alternatives Study to examine transit possibilities on the Sugar House Branch of the old Denver and Rio Grande Western Railroad (D&RGW). The study determined that a trolley running along a pre-existing rail line was the preferred alternative. In May 2009, Mayor Ralph Becker stated that the project could be complete by 2012, will cost $40 million to $50 million, and that he hopes it is the beginning of a new streetcar system across the city.

The S Line (formerly known as Sugar House Streetcar) began service on December 8, 2013 as planned, and an extension of the line north along 1100 East to Westminster University has been approved.

In September 2007, the owner of the Granite Block development on the corner of 1100 East and 2100 South, the site of many independent shops, announced plans to redevelop the area. In early 2008 the buildings on the eastern half of Granite Block were demolished in preparation for construction; developer Craig Mecham claimed that the buildings were "not safe" due to their age.

As a replacement, Mecham constructed a six-story building with apartments and ground-level retail/restaurants. Many residents and business owners in the area disapproved of the plans for fear that redevelopment would prevent local businesses from thriving and that big business and chain stores would dominate on and off the court. For several years a fenced-off demolition site resulted in a scar-like crater and source of controversy in the neighborhood. The Great Recession stalled the project.

On December 1, 2010, developer Craig Mecham submitted an overhauled development plan for what had come to be derisively called the "Sugar Hole", eliminating the originally planned office space and replacing the condos with apartments. The street-level retail would remain as originally proposed. Funding for the project was finally secured in 2011 and the project was completed in 2013.

== Notable people ==
- Jackie Biskupski (born 1966), mayor of Salt Lake City.
- Jared Goldberg (born 1991), Olympic skier.
- Logan Tom (born 1981), Olympic volleyball player.
- Joe Hill (1879-1915), Swedish-American labor activist, songwriter and member of the Industrial Workers of the World (IWW), incarcerated and executed at Sugar House Prison.
