= Sugar Equalization Board =

United States government agency

U.S. Sugar Equalization Board
Agency overview
- Formed: July 11, 1918
- Dissolved: July 14, 1926
- Headquarters: Washington D.C.
- Agency executive: Herbert Hoover, Chairman
- Parent agency: United States Food Administration

The U.S. Sugar Equalization Board was a United States government agency established on July 11, 1918, during World War I, to stimulate U.S. sugar production by equalizing prices of domestic and imported crops. The board was an agency of the United States Food Administration, with the Food Administrator serving as its chairman. The board was abolished in 1926 by Executive Order 4475.

== Background ==
The board bought and distributed the 1918–19 crop of Cuban sugar, and stimulated U.S. sugar production by equalizing prices of domestic and imported crops. The board also regulated coffee imports under authority of the War Trade Board and the U.S. Food Administration. In 1919, the board's contract with U.S. sugar refiners expired, and the responsibility for regulating and licensing sugar companies became a responsibility of the U.S. Attorney General. The board was a furtherance of the U.S. government's efforts to control the sugar industry during the early 20th century.

The board was abolished by President Calvin Coolidge by Executive Order 4475 in July 1926.

== Members of the Sugar Equalization Board ==
Early members of the board included:

- Herbert Hoover, chairman
- George M. Rolph, president
- Theodore Whitmarsh, U.S. Food Administration
- Robert A. Taft
- James Ford Bell
- F.W. Taussig, Tariff Commission
- George Zabriskie, Sugar Administrator
- Clarence Woolley, member of the War Trade Board
- William A. Glasgow Jr., U.S. Food Administration
