= Sugar House Park =

Park in Salt Lake City, Utah, U.S.

Coordinates: 40°43′23″N 111°50′56″W

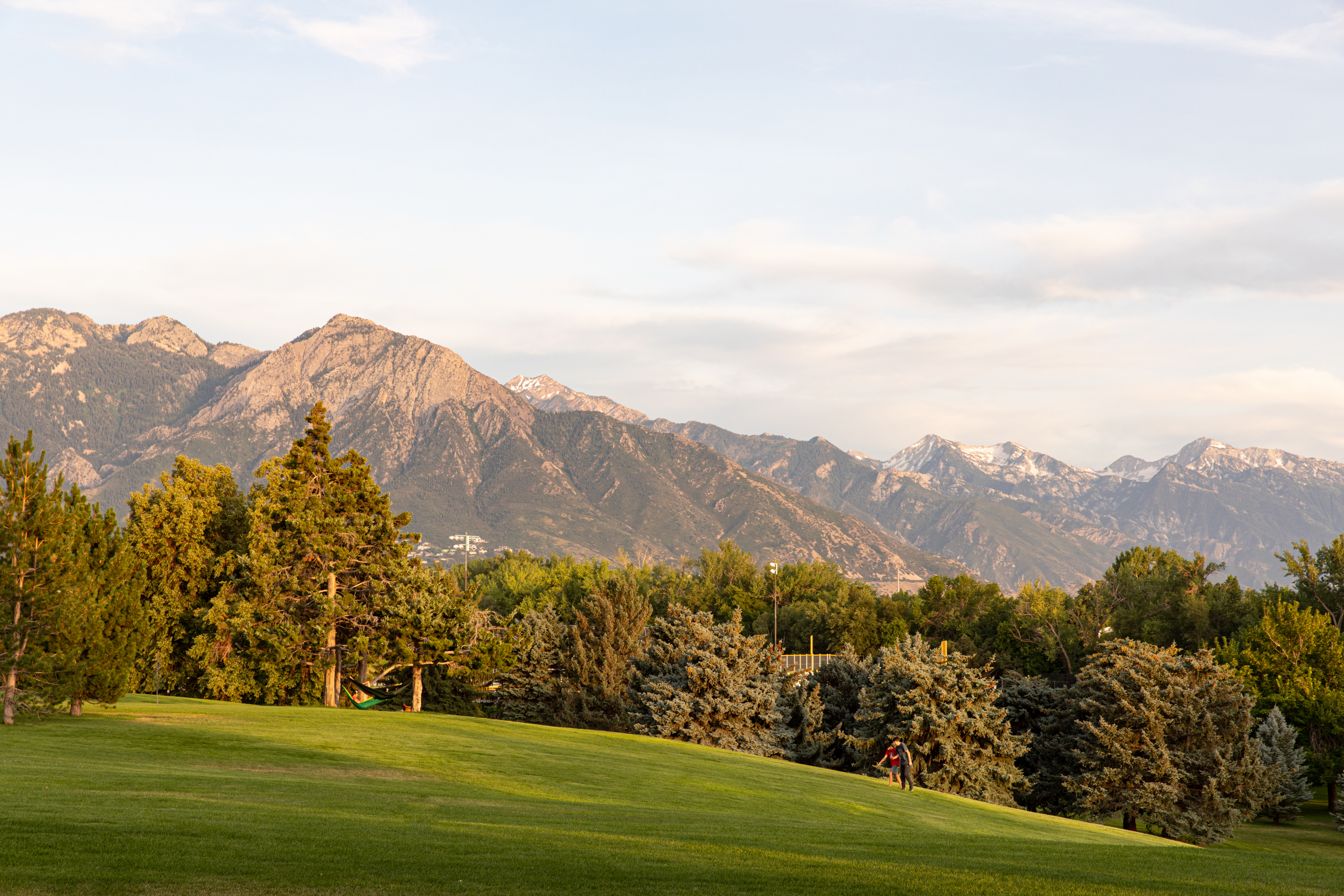
- Mt. Olympus as seen from Sugarhouse Park
- Interactive map of Sugar House Park
- Location: Sugar House, Salt Lake City, Utah, U.S.
- Website: sugarhousepark.org

Sugar House Park is located between I-80, 2100 South, 1300 East, and 1700 East in the heart of the Sugar House neighborhood of Salt Lake City, Utah, United States. The 110-acre (45 ha) park was the site of a fireworks show and concert every Independence Day (July 4), but the event was discontinued in 2018 due to environmental, logistical, and financial reasons.

The park was the location of Sugar House Prison, Utah's first state prison, until 1951 when the Utah State Prison was opened in Draper.

In 2023, the Central Utah Federation of Labor, AFL-CIO unveiled a monument near the site of the 1915 execution of Swedish-American labor organizer, songwriter and Industrial Workers of the World member, Joe Hill.

== Features ==
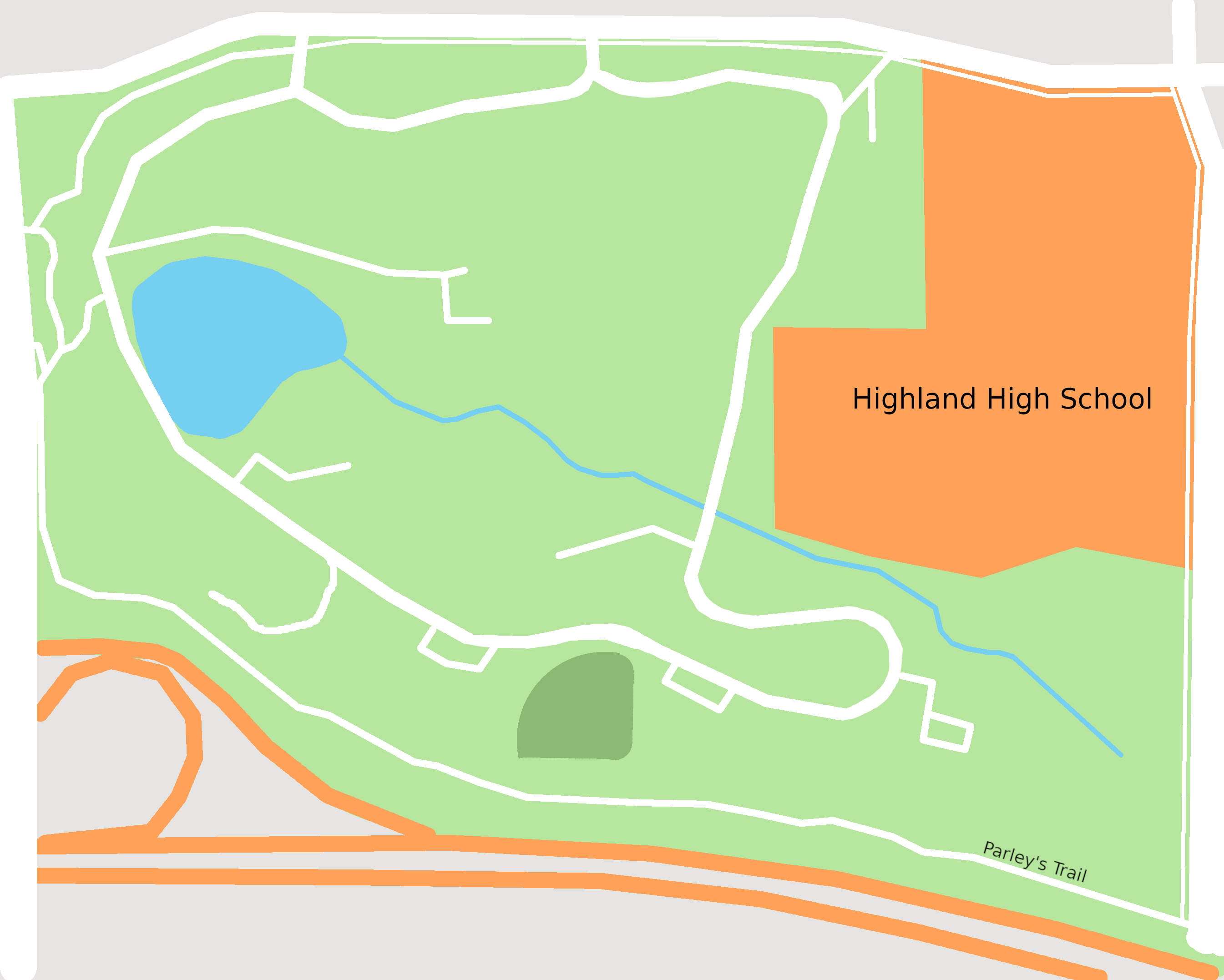
A basic layout of the park

- 10 pavilions for public use, available for reservation
- Popular sledding hills during the snowy months
- Parleys Canyon creek passes through the park
- 4.5-acre (1.8 ha) scenic pond with fountains
- "The Draw", a red rock canyon sculpture at the west edge of the park
- 2 Playgrounds
- Walking / jogging path estimated 1.8 miles (2.9 km) around the entire perimeter of the park
- Estimated 1.4-mile (2.3 km) road loop, great for cycling and jogging
- Baseball Field
- Basketball court
- Scattered picnic tables
- Sugar House Garden Center
