= Barry Kopetz =

Barry E. Kopetz (born 1951), is a composer and music educator.

He was Head of the Music Department at Mississippi State University from 2014 until 2022. Prior to his appointment at Mississippi State, he was Director of Bands and Professor of Music at Capital University in Columbus, Ohio, Director of Bands at the University of Utah, Assistant Director of Bands at the University of Minnesota, and Assistant Director of Bands at Bowling Green State University (Ohio). He has also taught in the public schools of South Carolina and Ohio.

He founded the Salt Lake Symphonic Winds and served as that ensemble's conductor for eight years, and founded the Columbus Youth Symphonic Band at Capital University. He served as music director and conductor of the Starkville Symphony Orchestra from 2014 until 2022.

Kopetz received both his bachelor's and master's degrees from The Ohio State University, and he holds a doctorate with distinction from the Jacobs School of Music at Indiana University. He studied conducting with Frederick Fennell in Tokyo, and his previous conducting teachers include the late Professor Frederick Ebbs and Professor Ray Cramer of Indiana University, and the late Dr. Donald McGinnis of Ohio State University. In 2010-2011, Kopetz was selected as an American Council on Education (ACE) Fellow and received advanced administrative and leadership training at the Pennsylvania State System of Higher Education in Harrisburg, Pennsylvania under Chancellor John Cavanaugh.

Kopetz is active as a composer and arranger, with over a hundred published works to his credit. Among his works is a Fantasia on a Theme from "The Southern Harmony." He has written numerous commissioned works and has composed for both chamber and large ensembles, as well as for television and film.

== Educational experience ==
- Doctor of Music Education with Distinction, Indiana University
- Master of Music Education, The Ohio State University
- Bachelor of Music Education, The Ohio State University
- Certificate, New York University School of Business
