= Sandy Station =

Sandy Station may refer to:

- the original name (or Sandy's Station) of Sandy, Utah
- Sandy railway station, in Bedfordshire, England
- Sandy Civic Center station, a Utah Transit Authority light rail station in Sandy, Utah
- Sandy Creek station (PAAC), a Port Authority of Allegheny County light rail station in Bethel Park, Pennsylvania
- Sandy Creek railway station, a former station in the Barossa Valley, South Australia
- Sandy Expo station, a Utah Transit Authority light rail station in Sandy, Utah
- Sandy Heath transmitting station, a television station in Bedfordshire, England
- Sandy Lodge tube station, in Hertfordshire, England, later renamed Moor Park tube station
- Sandy Springs station, a Metropolitan Atlanta Rapid Transit Authority metro station in Sandy Springs, Georgia
- Historic Sandy station, a Utah Transit Authority light rail station in Sandy, Utah
- Upper Sandy Guard Station Cabin, a U.S. Forest Service building in Mt. Hood National Forest, Clackamas County, Oregon
