= Midvale station =

Midvale station may refer to:

- Midvale Center station, a light rail station in Midvale, Utah
- Midvale Fort Union station, a light rail station in Midvale, Utah
- a fictional railway station near St. Louis, Missouri, where the television series Casey Jones was set
