= Blue Line (TRAX) =

Light rail line in the Salt Lake Valley of Utah

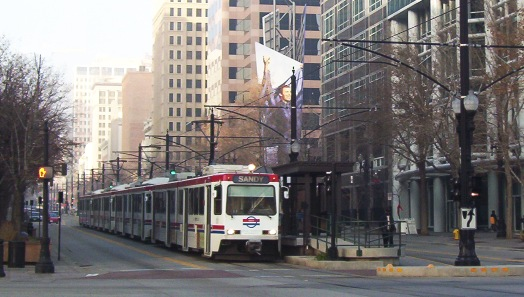
- Blue Line train at the Gallivan Plaza station in Downtown Salt Lake City, Utah

Overview
- Owner: Utah Transit Authority (UTA)
- Locale: Salt Lake Valley, Utah, U.S.
- Termini: Salt Lake Central; Draper Town Center
- Stations: 25

Service
- Type: Light rail
- System: TRAX
- Route number: 701
- Rolling stock: Siemens SD-100 and SD-160

History
- Opened: December 4, 1999; 26 years ago

Technical
- Line length: 19.3 mi (31.1 km)
- Number of tracks: 2
- Track gauge: 4 ft 8 1/2 in (1,435 mm) standard gauge
- Electrification: Overhead line, 750 V DC
- Operating speed: 55 mph (89 km/h) (max.)

The Blue Line is a light rail line on the TRAX system in the Salt Lake Valley of Utah, in the United States, operated by the Utah Transit Authority (UTA). It is the first line of the TRAX system completed. The line opened on December 4, 1999, one year ahead of schedule after two years of construction. In addition to Salt Lake City, it also serves the communities of South Salt Lake, Murray, Midvale, Sandy and Draper. The line was known as the North/South Line or the Sandy/Salt Lake Line until color names were adopted for each TRAX line in August 2011. An extension of the line to Draper began service on August 18, 2013.

As of 2019, the Utah Transit Authority has begun restoring the Siemens SD 100 and 160s that run on the line. The first restored unit was placed into service on April 8, 2019.

== Route ==
The TRAX Blue Line is designated as UTA Route 701. The right of way used by the Blue Line is one of the oldest in the state of Utah. It was first built by the Utah Southern Railroad in 1871, which was acquired by the Union Pacific Railroad and became their Salt Lake to Provo line. The line became largely unused after a 1985 track-sharing agreement between the Union Pacific and the Denver and Rio Grande Western. Both companies operated parallel lines in the area and the D&RGW line became the primary freight line between Provo and Salt Lake City. The former Union Pacific line was sold to the Utah Transit Authority in 1993 to eventually become the Blue Line's right of way. Since that time the line is not used for through freight traffic, however, there are freight customers that have a direct connection to the Blue Line, due to its origins as a freight railway. The Salt Lake City Southern Railroad was formed to serve these customers and manages the freight traffic over the Blue Line.

The Blue Line starts at Draper Town Center in northern Draper. This station is northwest of the Draper City buildings, northwest of the Draper City Park, and immediately north of East Pioneer Road (East 12400 South). From this station, the Blue Line heads west-northwest to cross Draper Parkway (East 12300 South) and then northwest along the southwest side of the Porter Rockwell Trail to cross East 12000 South and then South 700 East (SR-71). Immediately after crossing South 700 East it reaches Kimballs Lane. Continuing northwest (with the Porter Rockwell Trail running along the southwest side) it runs between residential neighborhoods until it crosses East 11400 South. Upon crossing East 11400 South it leaves Draper and enters Sandy and immediately reaches Crescent View. From this station the Blue Line heads north, with Porter Rockwell Trail (Sandy Rail Trail) once again on the east side of the tracks. Continuing north through residential neighborhoods, it crosses East 11000 South and East 10600 South.

Beyond East 10600 South, the Blue Line heads north-northwest until it reaches Sandy Civic Center (the former southern terminus of the Blue Line, until August 18, 2013). This station is several blocks east of Sandy City Hall and the South Towne Center Mall. The Porter Rockwell Trail runs by the east side of this station and, as the trail heads north, it crosses over to the west of the Blue Line tracks at East 10000 South/East 9800 South and then runs north parallel to the Blue Line until it ends at East 8530 South. From Sandy Civic Center, the Blue Line heads north, crossing East 10000 South/East 9800 South (Sego Lily Drive) and, while running along the west side of South 170 East, passing the east side of both Jordan High School and the South Towne Exposition Center. Just after crossing East 9400 South the Blue Line reaches an infill station, Sandy Expo, which provides service to Rio Tinto Stadium in addition to the Mountain America Exposition Center.

After Sandy Expo, the Blue Line continues north on the east side of South 150 East until it crosses East 9000 South (SR-209). Then it crosses over the East Jordan Canal and immediately reaches Historic Sandy. Following Historic Sandy, South 150 East (South Center Street) once again parallels the west side of the Blue Line until that road ends at East 8530 South. As the Blue Line continues north it crosses East 8800 South, East 8720 South (East Main Street), East 8680 South, and East 8530 South. From East 8800 South north to East 8530 South a thin strip of a park (Sandy Station Park), fits between the Blue Line and 150 East (Center Street). Beginning at East 8680 South, North 160 East also runs along the east side of the Blue Line until just after East 8500 South. Just north of East 8500 South the road still continues north along the east side of the tracks until it reaches East 8000 South, but is now designated as North 150 East. At about 8400 South, as the Blue Line leaves Sandy and enters Midvale, it begins to curve to the northwest as it crosses East 8000 South and then immediately over the Jordan Salt Lake City Canal before reaching South State Street (US Route 89).

After crossing over South State Street, but just south of West 7720 South (West Center Street), the Blue Line reaches Midvale Center. From that station it continues northwest, crossing West 7720 South and West 7500 South (6th Avenue), and then curves back toward the north until it reaches Midvale Fort Union, just south of West 7200 South. After crossing West 7200 South, it heads directly north (passing from Midvale into Murray) until it reaches the junction with the TRAX Red Line, which is immediately south of West Winchester Drive. The previous station for the Red Line is Bingham Junction, having started in the Daybreak community of South Jordan. (The Red Line also provides access to UTA's Lovendahl Rail Service Center which is located just west of I-15.) Just after the junction the two lines cross West Winchester Drive and immediately reach Fashion Place West.

From Fashion Place West, the Blue and Red lines continue north on the east side of South 300 West (Cottonwood Street) as they cross over I-215 and then cross West 6100 South and West 5900 South. Just prior to crossing over West 5400 South (SR-173/Spartan Street), the lines curve slightly to the east as they cross under Cottonwood Street (which curves more sharply to the east). At about 5150 South, the lines reach Murray Central. This station is located just west of the Intermountain Medical Center. It is one of only three joint TRAX/FrontRunner stations and one of two served by the Blue Line. The FrontRunner platform is located directly west of the TRAX platform. (The FrontRunner provides commuter rail service between Ogden in Weber County through Davis County and Salt Lake County to Provo in central Utah County.)

Heading north and slightly to the east from Murray Central, the Blue and Red lines cross West Vine Street (West 5090 South) and over Little Cottonwood Creek before continuing directly north as they cross West 4800 South and the 4500 South Frontage Road. After crossing over West 4500 South (SR-266) the lines reach Murray North at about 4300 South. After crossing West Fireclay Avenue, the lines curve slightly to the west as they continue north and cross over Big Cottonwood Creek. Upon crossing over Big Cottonwood Creek, the lines also leave Murray and briefly enter unincorporated Salt Lake County. Continuing north and slightly to the west, the lines cross West Central Avenue and then West 3900 South. At West 3900 South the lines leave unincorporated Salt Lake County and enter South Salt Lake. Immediately north of West 3900 South is Meadowbrook. From this station, the lines head directly north until they cross West 3300 South (SR-171) and immediately reach Millcreek. Continuing north from Millcreek the lines cross West Gregson Avenue, West 2950 South, and West 2700 South, before crossing under I-80.

From I-80 the lines continue north and cross West Haven Avenue before the junction with the TRAX Green Line. The previous station for the Green Line is River Trail, having originated in West Valley City. Just after the junction all three lines head north and reach Central Pointe, which is just south of West 2100 South (SR-201). Central Pointe is the only TRAX station served by the S Line. The S Line platform is situated just southeast of the TRAX platform. (The S Line provides streetcar service east to the Fairmont stop in the Sugar House neighborhood of Salt Lake City.)

Upon crossing West 2100 South the three TRAX lines leave South Salt Lake and enter Salt Lake City and continue north as they cross West 1700 South and West 1300 South. Just north of West 1300 South is Ballpark, which provides service to the Smith's Ballpark. (Immediately north of this station is a non-revenue track that extends northwest to South 400 West at West 900 South and then north to West 600 South.) After Ballpark the three lines continue north in the center median of South 200 West, crossing under the 900 South/I-15 on and off ramps, until they reach the next station, 900 South. This station, which is just north of West 900 South, is an infill station and the last stop before the TRAX lines reach Downtown Salt Lake City.

The three lines continue north in the median of South 200 West, crossing West 800 South, until they reach West 700 South. At West 700 South they turn east and proceed down the middle of that street for two blocks, crossing South West Temple Street (SR-270). At South Main Street, the lines turn north and continue down the center median of that street and cross West 600 South (Martin Luther King Jr Boulevard/SR-269 eastbound), pass between the Grand America Hotel and the Little America Hotel, and then cross West 500 South (Cesar E Chavez Boulevard/SR-269 westbound). Just north of West 500 South and slightly west of the Scott Matheson Courthouse, is the first station within the Free Fare Zone, Courthouse. At West 400 South (University Boulevard/US Highway 89) the Red Line turns east and heads toward Library and eventually the University of Utah while the Green and Blue lines continue north. After crossing West 300 South (West Broadway) the two lines reach Gallivan Plaza, which is just west of the Wells Fargo Center and the Gallivan Center.

Continuing in the median of South Main Street, the Green and Blue lines continue north crossing West 200 South and West 100 South before reaching City Center. This station is in the middle of the new City Creek Center commercial and residential development. At the north end of South Main Street the two lines turn west down the middle of West South Temple Street for a little more than a block before reaching the next station, Temple Square. This station is just southwest of Temple Square (home to the Salt Lake Temple, Salt Lake Tabernacle, and other notable buildings of the Church of Jesus Christ of Latter-day Saints). It is also just south of the Family History Library, about two blocks south of the LDS Conference Center, and immediately north of Abravanel Hall and the Salt Palace.

Continuing down the median of West South Temple Street the lines reach Arena (formerly Delta Center). This station is immediately north of the Delta Center, east of the Union Pacific Depot, and south of Ensign College. Arena was formerly the terminus of both the Sandy/Salt Lake and the old University Line. However, an extension opened on April 16, 2008, which provided access to the Salt Lake City Intermodal Hub and the new FrontRunner commuter rail train. Eventually the Sandy/Salt Lake Line was renamed the Blue Line and the University Line was renamed the Red Line and routed south. About this same time the Green Line was created and its route continued, along with the Blue Line, on to Salt Lake Central (Salt Lake City Intermodal Hub). However, with the rerouting of the Green Line to accommodate the Airport Extension, Arena became the temporary terminus of the Green Line from December 9, 2012, to April 13, 2013.

Following Arena, the two lines continue on to 400 West where they divide paths. The Green Line turns north down the middle of North 400 West towards North Temple Bridge/Guadalupe and eventually ending at the Salt Lake City International Airport, while the Blue Line turns south. Heading down the median of South 400 West, just after crossing West 100 South once again, it reaches Planetarium, which provides access to the Clark Planetarium as well as the rest of The Gateway. At West 200 South, the Blue Line turns west again and continues down the median of that street. Just after crossing 500 West it reaches Old Greek Town. After that station, it turns south again, heading down the middle of South 600 West to West 300 South. At the intersection of South 600 West and West 300 South, it shifts from the median to the west side of the street where it immediately reaches the last station on the Blue Line, Salt Lake Central (Salt Lake Intermodal Hub). From August 23, 2009, to October 31, 2009, the terminus was truncated to Arena station. Salt Lake Central provides access to the FrontRunner, as well as the Amtrak California Zephyr, and Greyhound Lines.

=== Park and Ride ===
Many TRAX stations include free Park and Ride lots, with some lots having as few as six parking spaces and others having nearly 1200. However, there are certain restrictions for all lots (for example, no 24-hour parking).

=== Free Fare Zone ===
UTA currently has a Free Fare Zone in Downtown Salt Lake City for transportation patrons that both enter and exit bus or TRAX service within the Zone. The Zone covers an area of approximately thirty-six city blocks and the boundaries are roughly North Temple, 200 East, 500 South, and 400 West. TRAX stations within the Zone include Arena, City Center, Courthouse, Gallivan Plaza (mistakenly identified as "Gallivan Center Station" on the Free Fare Zone map), Planetarium, and Temple Square. In addition, the Free Fare Zone also includes the area of the State Capitol (north to 500 North), the bus stops on 400 South between 200 East and 300 East, and three additional TRAX stations: Library, Old GreekTown, and Salt Lake Central. In June 2012 UTA revealed plans to eliminate the Free Fare Zone, but by September 2012 it announced that it would continue the Zone, but with some minor adjustments, including when and how fares are collected.

== Train schedule ==
As of December 2013

On weekdays the first southbound Blue Line trains (to the Draper Town Center Station) leave the Midvale Fort Union Station at about 4:30 am and the Salt Lake Central Station at about 5:45 am. The first northbound trains (to the Salt Lake Central Station) leave the Fashion Place West and the Draper Town Center stations at about 5:00 am. The last southbound train leave the Salt Lake Central at 11:28 pm and the last northbound train leaving the Draper Town Center Station at 11:40 pm. However, the last southbound train only goes as far as the Central Pointe Station; the last southbound train to the Draper Town Center Station leaves the Salt Lake Central Station at 10:43 pm. Also, the last northbound train only goes as far as the Midvale Fort Union Station; the last train to the Salt Lake Central leaves the Draper Town Center Station at 10:33 pm.

On Saturdays the first southbound trains leave the Central Pointe Station at about 6:00 am and the Salt Lake Central Station at about 7:00 am. The first northbound trains leave the Central Pointe Station at about 6:15 am and the Draper Town Station at about 6:30 am. The last southbound train leaves the Salt Lake Central Station at 11:32 pm and the last northbound train leaves the Draper Town Center Station at 11:49 pm. However, the last trains only go as far as the Central Pointe Station. The last southbound train to the Draper Town Center Station leaves the Salt Lake Central Station at 10:52 pm and the last northbound train to the Salt Lake Central leaves the Draper Town Center Station at 10:29 pm.

On Sundays the first northbound trains leave the Central Pointe Station at about 9:45 am and the Draper Town Center Station at about 10:00 am. The first southbound trains leave the Central Pointe Station at about 9:30 am and the Salt Lake Central at about 10:15 am. The first northbound trains leave the Central Pointe Station at about 9:30 am and the Draper Town Center Station at about 10:00 am. The last southbound train leaves Salt Lake Central Station at 8:12 pm and the last northbound train leaves Draper Town Center Station at 8:49 pm. However, the last trains only go as far as the Central Pointe Station. The last southbound train to the Draper Town Center Station leaves the Salt Lake Central Station at 7:52 pm and the last northbound train to the Salt Lake Central Station leaves the Draper Town Center Station at 7:09 pm.

Blue Line trains run every 15 minutes on weekdays and Saturdays, and every 30 minutes on Sundays.

== Stations ==
The following table lists the current stations of the Blue Line, from north to south.

Key
Ø	Free Fare Zone
†	Future station

Station Name	Municipality	Date opened	Major connections and notes
Salt Lake Central Ø	Salt Lake City	April 27, 2008	FrontRunner; Amtrak; Greyhound Lines
Old GreekTown Ø	Salt Lake City	April 27, 2008	
Planetarium Ø	Salt Lake City	April 27, 2008	Serves Clark Planetarium and The Gateway
Arena Ø	Salt Lake City	December 4, 1999	Green Line; Serves Delta Center
Temple Square Ø	Salt Lake City	December 4, 1999	Green Line; Serves Abravanel Hall and Temple Square
City Center Ø	Salt Lake City	December 4, 1999	Green Line; Serves City Creek Center
Gallivan Plaza Ø	Salt Lake City	December 4, 1999	Green Line; Serves the Gallivan Center
Courthouse Ø	Salt Lake City	December 4, 1999	Red Line; Green Line; Serves the Federal Courthouse and Third District Courthouse
600 South	Salt Lake City	July 26, 2022	Red Line; Green Line
900 South	Salt Lake City	May 19, 2005	Red Line; Green Line
Ballpark	Salt Lake City	December 4, 1999	Red Line; Green Line; Serves Smith's Ballpark; Park and ride: 170 spaces
Central Pointe	South Salt Lake	December 4, 1999	Red Line; Green Line; S Line; Park and ride: 57 spaces
Millcreek	South Salt Lake	December 4, 1999	Red Line; Park and ride: 101 spaces
Meadowbrook	South Salt Lake	December 4, 1999	Red Line; Park and ride: 497 spaces
Murray North	Murray	December 4, 1999	Red Line; Park and ride: 235 spaces
Murray Central	Murray	December 4, 1999	FrontRunner; Red Line; Serves the Intermountain Medical Center; Park and ride: 750 spaces
Fashion Place West	Murray	December 4, 1999	Red Line; Park and ride: 100 spaces
Midvale Fort Union	Midvale	December 4, 1999	Park and ride: 266 spaces
Midvale Center	Midvale	December 4, 1999	Park and ride: 142 spaces
Historic Sandy	Sandy	December 4, 1999	Park and ride: 316 spaces
Sandy Expo	Sandy	August 28, 2006	Serves Mountain America Exposition Center and Rio Tinto Stadium
Sandy Civic Center	Sandy	December 4, 1999	Serves South Towne Center; Park and ride: 1,185 spaces
Crescent View	Sandy	August 18, 2013	Park and ride lot
Kimballs Lane	Draper	August 18, 2013	Park and ride lot
Draper Town Center	Draper	August 18, 2013	Serves Draper City Hall; Park and ride lot
Highland †	Draper	Planned (no scheduled date)	Park and ride lot
14600 South †	Draper	Planned (no scheduled date)	Near I-15, will eventually have 1,300+ parking spaces

=== Station accessibility ===
Unlike the Red and Green Lines, the Blue Line uses high-floor vehicles without level-boarding. All Blue Line stations have mini-high platforms and train operators may need to assist riders with their use. These ramps are not used for the Red or Green Lines. Some riders have complained they can't roll their wheelchair up the steep ramps rendering the Blue Line inaccessible to them without operator assistance, and UTA policy does not allow passengers with strollers or luggage to use access ramps, forcing them to lift those items up the stairs of the train.

Similar systems that use a mix of high-floor and low-floor vehicles, operate trains with both types of vehicles, which allow level boarding on all lines without needing mini-high platforms.

=== Draper extension ===
The first phase of an extension of the Blue Line to Draper opened August 18, 2013. Construction on the extension began in 2010 as part of UTA's FrontLines 2015 project, which also includes the West Valley extension of the Green Line, the Mid-Jordan extension of the Red Line, the southern extension of the FrontRunner commuter rail line and the Airport TRAX Line (now part of the Green Line). The first phase of the Draper extension extended the line south from Sandy Civic Center Station to the Draper Town Center Station. A planned phase two of the extension would have taken the line down to 14600 S. with stations on Highland Drive at about 13800 South and the other on 14600 South just east of I-15 (Exit 288). The second phase was ultimately canceled. In 2023, UDOT revealed its intention to build a new light rail line at the former Utah state prison site. This project, known as the Point of the Mountain Transit Project is to help increase transit mobility around the Salt Lake and Utah country border. The project design does not include connecting back north to the blue line, but multiple planning documents indicate that a blue line extension is still under consideration.

== See also ==
- List of rapid transit systems
- Transportation in Salt Lake City
- TRAX (light rail)
- TRAX Red Line
- TRAX Green Line
- FrontRunner
- Utah Transit Authority bus rapid transit
- S Line (formerly known as Sugar House Streetcar)
