= Midvale Fort Union station =

Light rail station in Midvale, Utah, United States

Midvale Fort Union
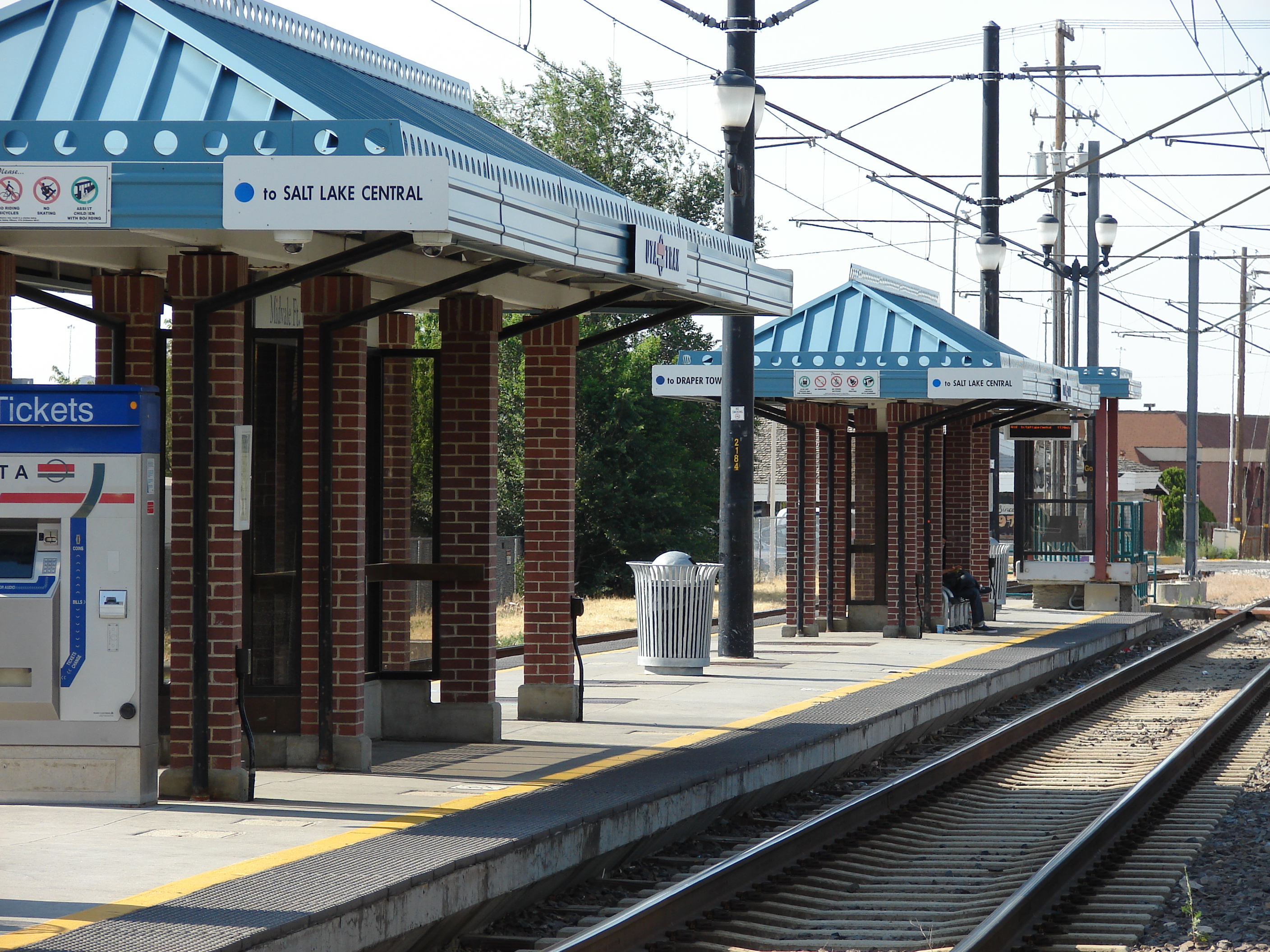

General information
- Location: 7250 South 180 West; Midvale, Utah; United States
- Coordinates: 40°37′09″N 111°53′54″W
- Owner: Utah Transit Authority (UTA)
- Platforms: 1 island platform
- Tracks: 2
- Connections: UTA: 72, 953, 972

Construction
- Structure type: At-grade
- Parking: 266 spaces
- Cycle facilities: 3 lockers
- Accessible: Yes

History
- Opened: December 4, 1999; 26 years ago

Services
Preceding station	Utah Transit Authority	Following station
Fashion Place West toward Salt Lake Central	Blue Line	Midvale Center toward Draper Town Center
Former services
Preceding station	Utah Transit Authority	Following station
Fashion Place West toward University Medical Center	Sandy/University Line	Midvale Center toward Sandy Civic Center
Location

Midvale Fort Union station is a light rail station in Midvale, Utah, United States, served by the Blue Line of Utah Transit Authority's TRAX light rail system. The Blue Line provides service from Downtown Salt Lake City to Draper.

== Description ==
The station is located at 7250 South 180 West and is accessible from 7200 South (SR-48), both from State Street (US-89) on the east or the I-15/7200 South (which is just a few blocks west). The station is more than a mile west of the historic settlement and modern commercial district of Fort Union and also a mile northeast of Midvale's historic downtown area. The low-density retail and commercial development in the area around the station serves as a bridge between the two more established centers, however, neither area has adequate direct service by TRAX due to their distance from the station. The area surrounding the station has become a center for affordable hotel and motel development due to easy access to Interstates 15 and 215 and the station's status as a hub for UTA's seasonal ski buses to Big and Little Cottonwood Canyons. The station has a Park and Ride lot with 266 spaces available. The station was opened on December 4, 1999 as part of the original TRAX line and is operated by the Utah Transit Authority.
