= Historic Sandy station =

Light rail station in Sandy, Utah, United States

Historic Sandy
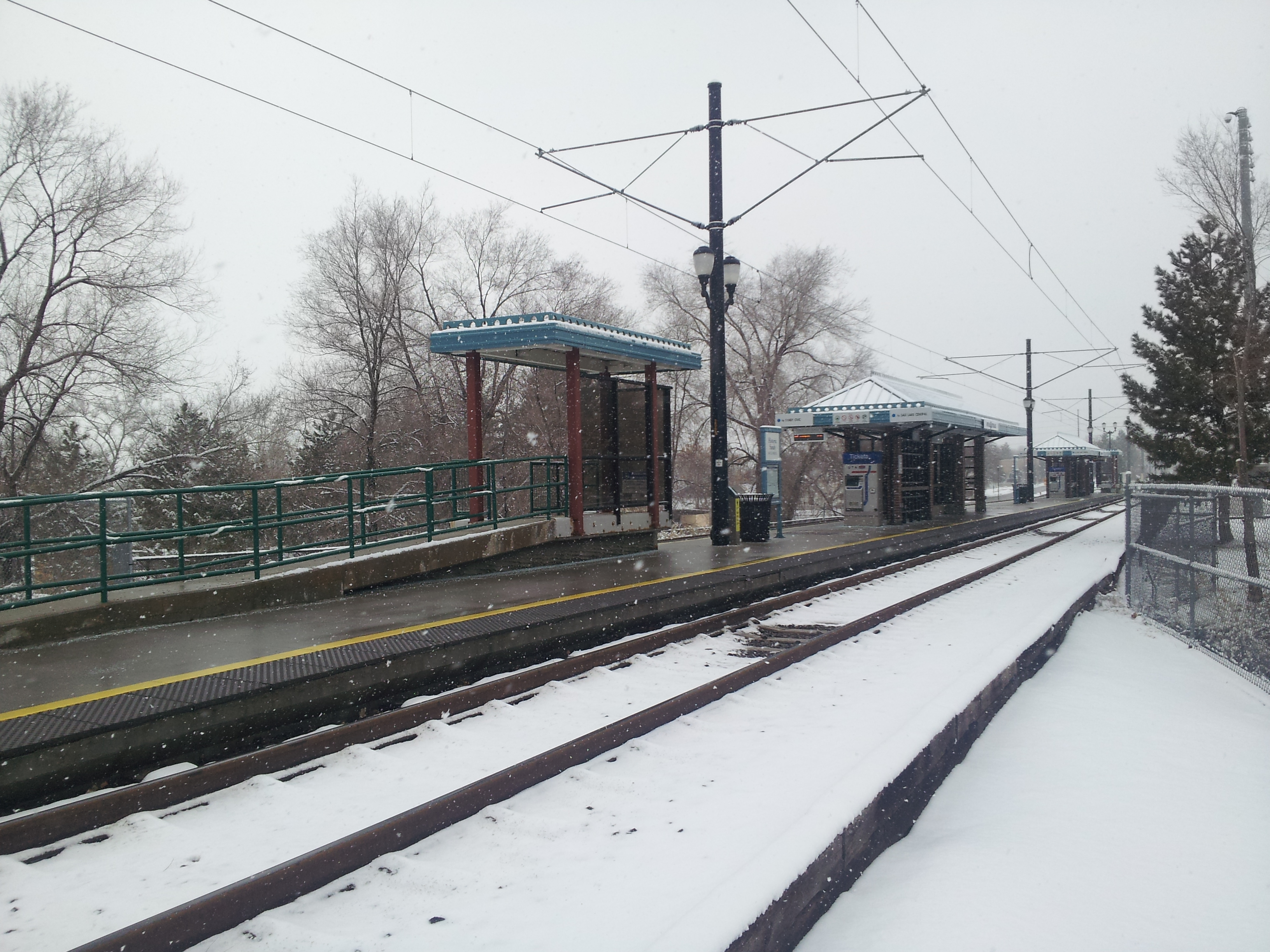
- Snow-covered Historic Sandy station

General information
- Location: 9000 South 165 East; Sandy, Utah; United States
- Coordinates: 40°35′23″N 111°53′08″W
- Owner: Utah Transit Authority (UTA)
- Platforms: 1 island platform
- Tracks: 2
- Connections: UTA: F94, F590, 994

Construction
- Structure type: At-grade
- Parking: 316 spaces
- Cycle facilities: 3 lockers
- Accessible: Yes

History
- Opened: December 4, 1999; 26 years ago

Services
Preceding station	Utah Transit Authority	Following station
Midvale Center toward Salt Lake Central	Blue Line	Sandy Expo toward Draper Town Center
Former services
Preceding station	Utah Transit Authority	Following station
Terminus	Sandy/University Line	Terminus
Midvale Center toward University Medical Center	Sandy/University Line	Sandy Expo toward Sandy Civic Center
Location

Historic Sandy station is a light rail station in Sandy, Utah, United States, served by the Blue Line of Utah Transit Authority's TRAX light rail system. The Blue Line provides service from Downtown Salt Lake City to Draper.

== Description ==
The station is located at 9000 South 165 East and is accessible from 9000 South (SR-209), as well as 8800 South. There is also pedestrian and bicycle access from the Porter Rockwell Trail (Sandy Railtrail) on the west side of the tracks. The station is situated in a suburban residential area within Sandy's original street grid, which has much smaller blocks than is standard in Salt Lake County. The south end of the island platform is built over a major canal carrying water north from the Jordan River. The southwest corner of the platform connects directly to a small park next to the canal (and Porter Rockwell Trail). The station has a Park and Ride lot with over 315 free parking spaces available. The station was opened on December 4, 1999, as part of the original TRAX line and is operated by the Utah Transit Authority.
