= Fort Union (Utah) =

- Commercial area
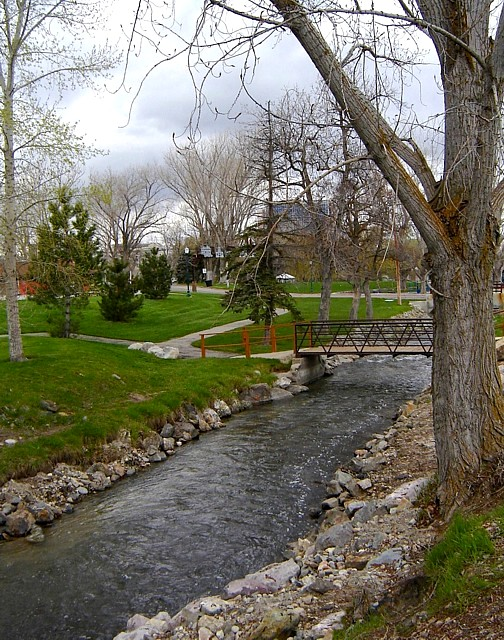
- Little Cottonwood Creek in Fort Union
- Interactive map of Fort Union
- Coordinates: 40°37′12″N 111°52′03″W
- Country: United States
- State: Utah
- County: Salt Lake
- Established: 1849
- Founder: Jehu Cox

Fort Union, historically Union, is a major commercial area and an early settlement in the Salt Lake Valley of Utah that is now split between the municipalities of Midvale, Cottonwood Heights, and Sandy. The fort after which the area was named was built early (1853) in the Salt Lake Valley's post-1847 history at a strategic point where escarpments on either side of the Little Cottonwood Creek valley create a narrow gateway to the upper valley and Little Cottonwood Canyon beyond. The effects of geography on travel through the area have also contributed to the area's much more recent success as a retail and employment destination.

== History ==
Historical population
Census	Pop.	Note	%±
1880	484		—
1890	602		24.4%
1900	757		25.7%
Source: U.S. Census Bureau

The community of Union was first settled in 1849 by Jehu Cox. There were 8 families in the settlement that year. Silas Richards was appointed Bishop and organized a ward. By the following year the little settlement doubled in number. 1850 Silas Richards taught the first school of 30 to 35 scholars and he continued to do so for several winters. Union was first called Little Cottonwood, then South Cottonwood. The defensive Union Fort was founded to help secure the area for the early farmers living nearby, and it also provided security for shipments of granite (or quartz monzonite) from the mouth of Little Cottonwood Canyon for the construction of the Salt Lake Temple. 1853, in consequence of Indian depredations and trouble, it was thought to be expedient to build a fortification and live inside the walls. The elected site for the village was four rods square. The wall which had port holes was built of rock, clay and adobe twelve feet high around the sides. Twenty-three families lived inside in an adobe house. "We called our town Union." It was laid off in lots and streets. The cost was great. A large adobe school house was built in the center of Union to be used for school and meetings. Around noon July 24, 1857 news was reported that troops were coming from the states, sent by the general government. "It was the first tidings of war." The week of November 16, 1857, Twenty [men] from Union (joined about 1500 in the mountains) to, "check the advance of our enemies who were threatening to exterminate us from the earth." February 1858 a great portion of the inhabitants of Union were plagued with a violent cough and cold, or influenza. Reportedly the disease prevailed in Salt Lake City and throughout the country. March 22, 1858 orders were given to move South because of the advancing army. By May 27 an encampment of some 40 families from Union formed four miles south of Payson (about 43 miles south of Union). By July an agreement of peace had been entered into and families returned to Union. The fort was located near the modern intersection of North Union Avenue and 1000 East Street. The most visible remnants of this era are the old preserved Jehu Cox house (moved from its original location and now used as a shop), about a block north of North Union Avenue in an area that is now a large parking lot, and a historic marker at the site of the fort. The pioneer cemetery for the settlement is also preserved, but it is about a half mile southeast along Creek Road. Until the late 20th century, the Union Fort area remained a local center, but never had a large population and remained nearly rural. The name eventually was altered to "Fort Union".

== Transportation ==
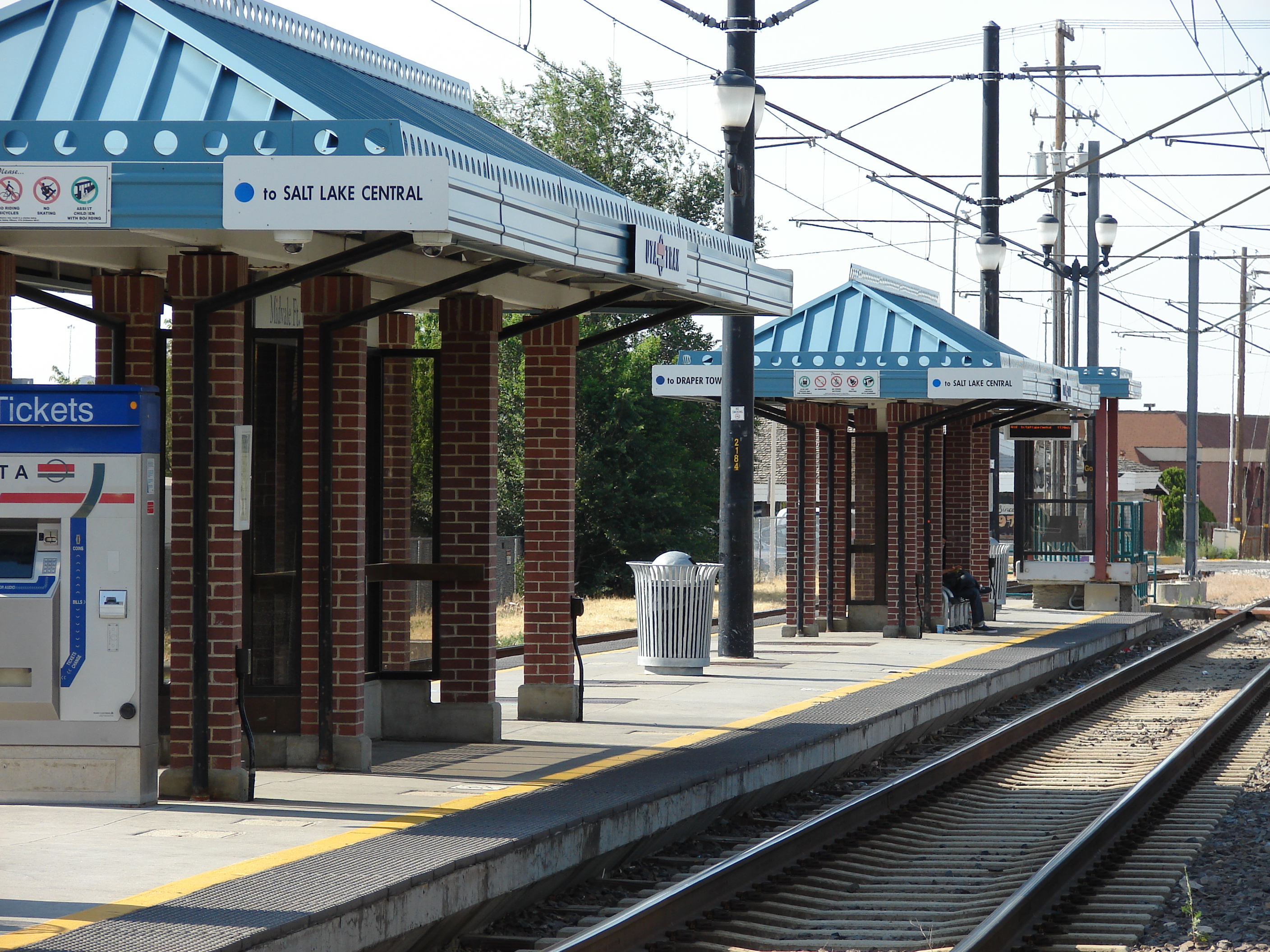
Midvale Fort Union station, June 2015

The three most important roads in Fort Union are Utah State Route 71, 1300 East Street, and Fort Union Boulevard. For most of their length (they both run nearly the full length of the Salt Lake Valley), State Route 71 and 1300 East are parallel north-south roads running more than half a mile apart. In Fort Union, however, they swing closer together: 1300 East swings west to follow the ridge line of the escarpment south of Little Cottonwood Creek and State Route 71 swings east (from 700 East to 900 East) following the East Jordan Canal's curve into the lowlands around Little Cottonwood Creek. Fort Union Boulevard is an east-west road that curves around the northern Fort Union area on its way from Interstate 15 to Big Cottonwood Canyon.

Other roads around Fort Union include 1000 East Street, Creek Road, Union Park Avenue, and (nearby) Interstate 215. 1000 East runs due south between State Route 71 and 1300 East, Creek Road is the historically important route along the bottom of the Little Cottonwood Creek Valley, and Union Park Avenue was built to connect Fort Union to its exit on I-215 (about a third of a mile north of Fort Union Boulevard). Unlike most of the Salt Lake Valley, which uses a loose grid system, the roads entering the Fort Union are essentially radial; clockwise, starting from the north, the locally-radial roads are: Union Park Avenue, 1300 East, Creek Road, 1300 East, 1000 East, State Route 71, Fort Union Boulevard, and State Route 71.

The Utah Transit Authority and Wasatch Front Regional Council have proposed bus rapid transit lines connecting Fort Union to the TRAX light rail system to the west as well as north-to-south along the full length of 1300 East, but there are no concrete plans and ordinary bus lines are the only public transportation available.

== Development ==
Suburban development in the surrounding areas started to affect Fort Union in the mid to late 20th century, but the largest surge of development occurred in the 1990s after the nearby portion of I-215 opened. The area bounded by State Route 71, Fort Union Boulevard, North Union Avenue, and the western slopes of the plateau on the north side of Little Cottonwood Creek has been filled with almost nothing but big-box store developments (containing some smaller-scale retail) and office towers, with associated parking facilities; previously, development had occurred mostly along the main roads through the area leaving big gaps of open fields that were quickly filled-in during the 1990s.

The largest-scale development since the 1990s has been south along 1300 East in the small portion of Fort Union within Sandy. Office development in this area has increased the total number of major (4-6 story) office towers in Fort Union to about a dozen.

== Government ==
The Fort Union area is split between three municipalities: Midvale includes the historic fort site and everything to the west of it, Cottonwood Heights includes almost everything east of the fort site, and Sandy includes a narrow corridor running north-to-south along 1300 East and the ridge line that it follows (all to the south of the fort site).

Cottonwood Heights is the only city of the three to have its city hall in the area. There is no other area in Cottonwood Heights that has both major retail development and major office developments in close proximity, so the location is a natural choice even though it is in the northwest corner of the city.

== Education ==
All of Fort Union is in the Canyons School District. Hillcrest High School is on the west side of State Route 71 near South Union Avenue. Mountview elementary school, which had not been in use for years, was torn down in 2011 to make room for a new park at the northeast corner of the Fort Union commercial district.
