= Midvale Center station =

Light rail station in Midvale, Utah, United States

Midvale Center
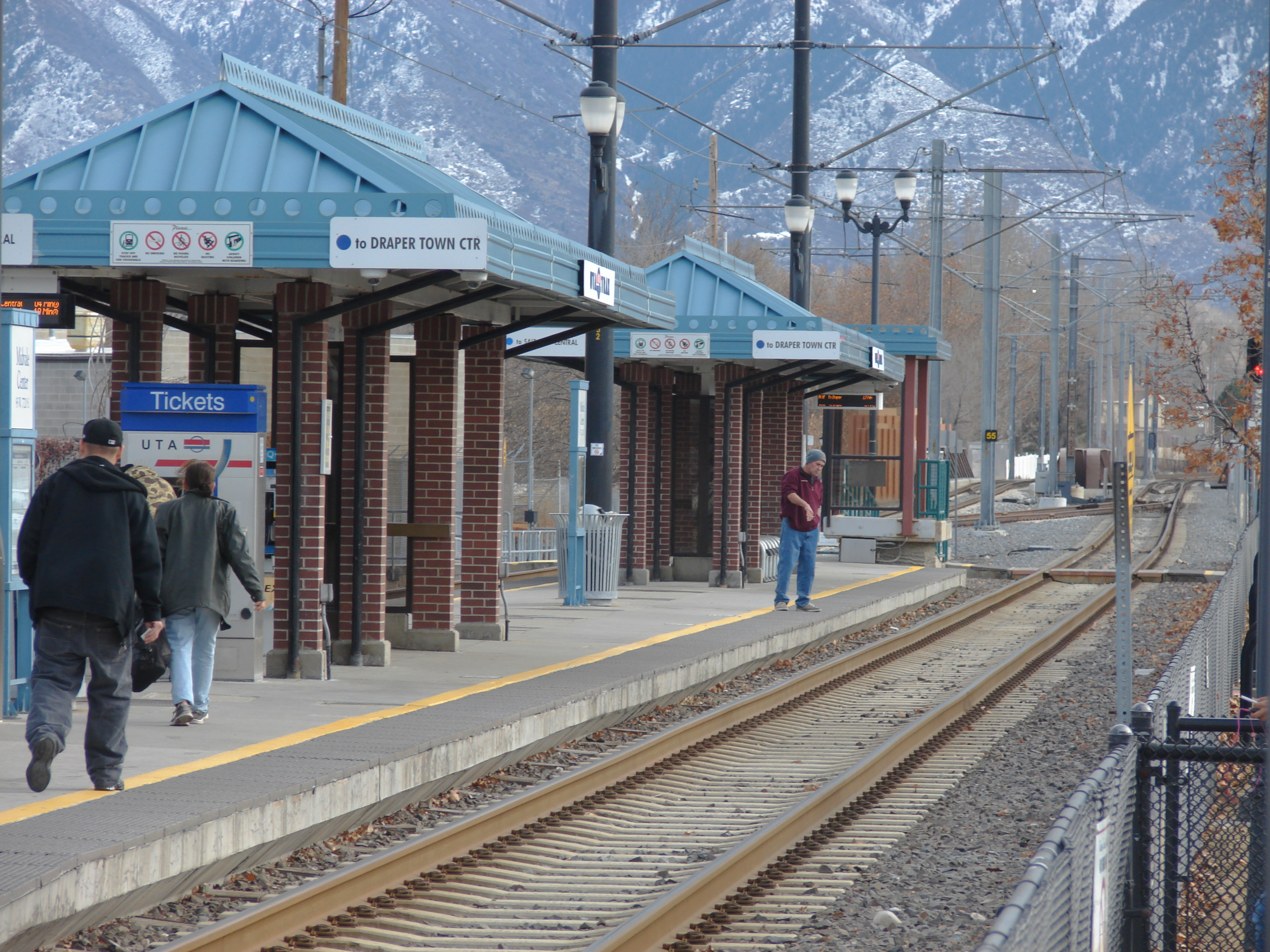
- Midvale Center station platform

General information
- Location: 95 West 7720 South; Midvale, Utah; United States
- Coordinates: 40°36′37″N 111°53′34″W
- Owner: Utah Transit Authority (UTA)
- Platforms: 1 island platform
- Tracks: 2
- Connections: UTA: 213, F525, F570, F578

Construction
- Structure type: At-grade
- Parking: 142 spaces
- Cycle facilities: 3 lockers
- Accessible: Yes

History
- Opened: December 4, 1999; 26 years ago

Services
| Preceding station | Utah Transit Authority | Following station |
|---|---|---|
| Midvale Fort Union toward Salt Lake Central | Blue Line | Historic Sandy toward Draper Town Center |
Former services
| Preceding station | Utah Transit Authority | Following station |
|---|---|---|
| Midvale Fort Union toward University Medical Center | Sandy/University Line | Historic Sandy toward Sandy Civic Center |
Location

Midvale Center station is a light rail station in Midvale, Utah, United States, served by the Blue Line of Utah Transit Authority's TRAX light rail system. The Blue Line provides service from Downtown Salt Lake City to Draper.

== Description ==
The station is located at 95 West 7720 South (West Center Street) and is accessible from State Street (US-89) by heading a few blocks west on 7720 South. There is also pedestrian and bicycle access directly from 7720 South and from State Street (at about 7875 South and at 7800 South). The station is just northwest of the Blue Line's rail bridge over State Street. From the system's opening until 2007, the State Street Bridge was originally an Art Deco style single track bridge from the 1930s that was built by the WPA, with trains in both directions using the northbound track. This was the only section of single track on a TRAX line. In 2007, UTA double tracked the bridge by completely replacing it, which made it possible for headways on the line to be decreased from 15 minutes to 10 minutes. To the east of the station is the Midvale Post Office and towards the southwest is a residential neighborhood. The station has a Park and Ride lot with over free 140 spaces available. The station was opened on December 4, 1999, as part of the original TRAX line and is operated by the Utah Transit Authority.
