= Crescent View station =

Light rail station in Sandy, Utah, United States

Crescent View
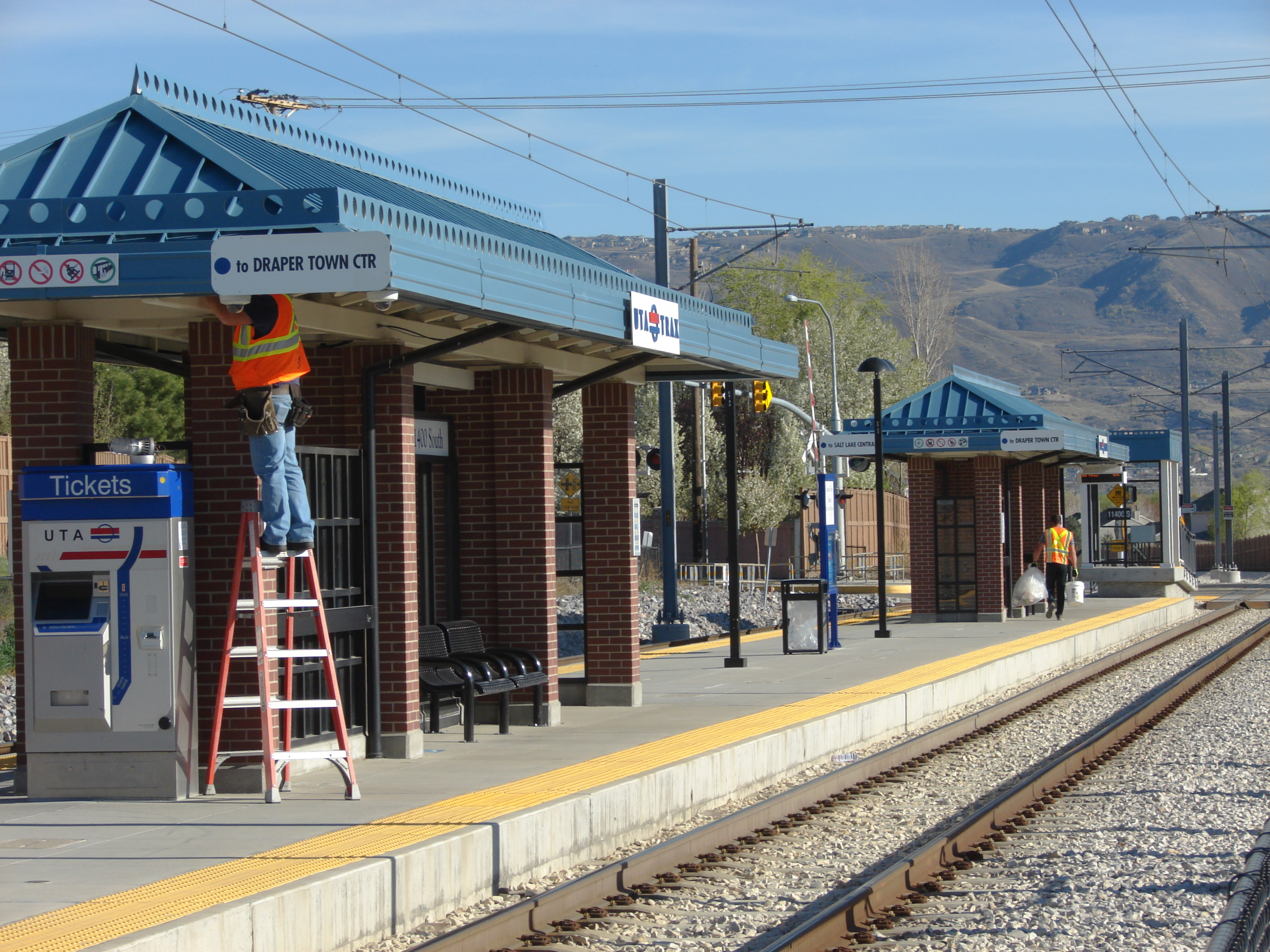

General information
- Location: 361 East 11400 South; Sandy, Utah; United States
- Coordinates: 40°32′43″N 111°52′44″W
- Owner: Utah Transit Authority (UTA)
- Platforms: 1 island platform
- Tracks: 2
- Connections: UTA: On Demand South Valley

Construction
- Structure type: At-grade
- Parking: Yes
- Accessible: Yes

History
- Opened: August 18, 2013; 13 years ago

Services
Preceding station	Utah Transit Authority	Following station
Sandy Civic Center toward Salt Lake Central	Blue Line	Kimballs Lane toward Draper Town Center
Location

Crescent View station is a light rail station in Sandy, Utah, United States, served by the Blue Line of Utah Transit Authority's TRAX light rail system. The Blue Line provides service from Downtown Salt Lake City to Draper.

== Description ==
The station is located in the southern end of Sandy at 361 East 11400 South and is accessed on that road from either I-15 on the west (via the I-15/11400 South interchange) or 700 East (SR-71) on the east. The station is located within a residential area of the city, with no commercial development nearby. Immediately east of the station is the Porter Rockwell Trail (Sandy Railtrail).

The station has a free Park and Ride lot. A unique feature of the station is signage that shows currently available parking spaces in the Park and Ride lot at this station, as well as at the two stations further south (Kimballs Lane and Draper Town Center).

The station opened August 18, 2013, as part of the Draper extension of the Blue Line and is operated by Utah Transit Authority.
