= Midvale, Utah =

Midvale City, Utah
- City
- Location in Salt Lake County and the state of Utah
- Coordinates: 40°36′50″N 111°53′18″W
- Country: United States
- State: Utah
- County: Salt Lake

Area
  - Total: 5.92 sq mi (15.32 km^{2})
  - Land: 5.92 sq mi (15.32 km^{2})
  - Water: 0 sq mi (0.00 km^{2})
- Elevation: 4,383 ft (1,336 m)

Population (2020)
  - Total: 36,028
  - Density: 6,091/sq mi (2,352/km^{2})
- Time zone: UTC−7 (Mountain (MST))
  - Summer (DST): UTC−6 (MDT)
- ZIP code: 84047
- Area codes: 385, 801
- FIPS code: 49-49710
- GNIS feature ID: 1430307
- Website: www.midvale.utah.gov

Midvale is a city in Salt Lake County, Utah, United States. It is part of the Salt Lake City metropolitan area. Midvale's population was 36,028 according to the 2020 United States Census.

Midvale is home to the Shops at Fort Union, located on the East side of the city and the Bingham Junction economic center, located on the west side of the city. Midvale is centrally located in the most populous county in Utah and is bisected by Interstate 15. Interstate 215 serves as the northern boundary of the city's east side. Midvale is one of the few cities in Utah to be home to two direct TRAX light rail lines and three TRAX stations.

== Geography ==
According to the United States Census Bureau, the city has a total area of 5.8 square miles (15.1 km^{2}), all land. The western border of Midvale is the Jordan River, which flows down the center of the Salt Lake Valley.

=== Climate ===
This climatic region is typified by large seasonal temperature differences, with warm to hot summers and cold winters. According to the Köppen Climate Classification system, Midvale has a humid continental climate, abbreviated Dfb on climate maps.

Climate data for Midvale, Utah
Month	Jan	Feb	Mar	Apr	May	Jun	Jul	Aug	Sep	Oct	Nov	Dec	Year
Record high °F (°C)	64 (18)	70 (21)	80 (27)	87 (31)	107 (42)	110 (43)	108 (42)	107 (42)	100 (38)	92 (33)	78 (26)	66 (19)	108 (42)
Mean daily maximum °F (°C)	38 (3)	44 (7)	53 (12)	64 (18)	73 (23)	84 (29)	93 (34)	91 (33)	81 (27)	67 (19)	51 (11)	41 (5)	65 (18)
Mean daily minimum °F (°C)	17 (−8)	23 (−5)	29 (−2)	36 (2)	43 (6)	50 (10)	58 (14)	57 (14)	47 (8)	37 (3)	27 (−3)	21 (−6)	37 (3)
Record low °F (°C)	−25 (−32)	−19 (−28)	−4 (−20)	11 (−12)	22 (−6)	30 (−1)	35 (2)	36 (2)	18 (−8)	10 (−12)	−16 (−27)	−22 (−30)	−25 (−32)
Average precipitation inches (mm)	1.2 (30)	1.3 (33)	1.6 (41)	1.8 (46)	1.4 (36)	0.9 (23)	0.7 (18)	1 (25)	.8 (20)	1.4 (36)	1.3 (33)	1.4 (36)	14.7 (370)
Source: weather.com

== Demographics ==
Historical population
Census	Pop.	Note	%±
1910	1,760		—
1920	2,209		25.5%
1930	2,451		11.0%
1940	2,875		17.3%
1950	3,996		39.0%
1960	5,802		45.2%
1970	7,840		35.1%
1980	10,146		29.4%
1990	11,886		17.1%
2000	27,029		127.4%
2010	27,964		3.5%
2020	36,028		28.8%
U.S. Decennial Census

=== 2020 census ===
As of the 2020 census, Midvale had a population of 36,028. The median age was 31.8 years. 23.3% of residents were under the age of 18 and 10.3% of residents were 65 years of age or older. For every 100 females there were 99.2 males, and for every 100 females age 18 and over there were 97.1 males age 18 and over.

100.0% of residents lived in urban areas, while 0.0% lived in rural areas.

There were 14,398 households in Midvale, of which 30.1% had children under the age of 18 living in them. Of all households, 37.3% were married-couple households, 23.1% were households with a male householder and no spouse or partner present, and 29.5% were households with a female householder and no spouse or partner present. About 29.3% of all households were made up of individuals and 7.6% had someone living alone who was 65 years of age or older.

There were 15,430 housing units, of which 6.7% were vacant. The homeowner vacancy rate was 0.7% and the rental vacancy rate was 8.5%.

Racial composition as of the 2020 census
Race	Number	Percent
White	24,154	67.0%
Black or African American	1,076	3.0%
American Indian and Alaska Native	507	1.4%
Asian	1,525	4.2%
Native Hawaiian and Other Pacific Islander	556	1.5%
Some other race	3,978	11.0%
Two or more races	4,232	11.7%
Hispanic or Latino (of any race)	8,389	23.3%

== Law and government ==
Midvale City has a nonpartisan mayor-council form of government. The Mayor and five Council members are elected to four-year terms. The current mayor is Dustin Gettel. Current City Council members include Bonnie Billings, Paul Glover, Heidi Robinson, Denece Mikolash and Bryant Brown. With Denece Mikolash being sworn in on 7 January 2025, Midvale City has its first woman majority city council.

Fire protection and police services for Midvale City are provided by contracted arrangements with the Unified Fire Authority (UFA) of Greater Salt Lake and with the Unified Police Department (UPD) of Greater Salt Lake, respectively. The current UPD Precinct Chief for the Midvale City Precinct is April Morse and the UFA Fire Chief is Dominic Burchett.

== Education ==
Jordan School District was the primary school district in Midvale until 2009. In 2007, citizens voted to split Jordan School District to create 2 separate school districts - Jordan School District and the newly created Canyons School District. The Canyons School District began operation at the beginning of the 2009–10 school year and is now the primary school district serving Midvale.

Midvale has 4 elementary schools (Copperview Elementary, East Midvale Elementary, Midvale Elementary, and Midvalley Elementary), two middle schools (Midvale Middle School and Union Middle School), and one High School (Hillcrest High School).

== Media ==
The Midvale City Journal is a monthly newspaper delivered to homes in Midvale City. The Journal covers local stories in Sports, Education, City Council, and Local Life.

Some scenes from the mini-series The Stand as well as scenes from the movies Halloween 4: The Return of Michael Myers, Gentlemen Broncos, and The Sandlot, were filmed in downtown Midvale, including the interior of an old-fashioned drugstore by the name of Vincent Drug. The store stayed in business and retained products in packaging over 50 years old for this type of display purpose. Vincent Drug shut down in 2003.

== History ==
Located in the central part of the Salt Lake Valley, and next to the Jordan River, Midvale was an early target for settlers in Utah. Permanent homes began as early as the 1850s, with one of the earliest homes still preserved today. The population grew quickly in the 1870s thanks to its central location, the use of railroad, and its connection to the mining in Bingham Canyon, the western area of present-day Midvale became an important industrial area for Utah. To support this growth, the eastern area of present-day Midvale provided agriculture and housing.

=== Incorporation ===
The name "Midvale" was presumably adopted due to the area’s central location within the Salt Lake Valley. In 1909 Midvale officially became a city and in the 1910 census had a population of 1,760.

=== Growth ===
==== Fort Union ====
Fort Union, historically Union, was an early settlement area on the eastern edge of present-day Midvale. When Midvale annexed the Fort Union Area, it brought an established housing population. However, it did not just provide the city with a much larger population base, it also brought the city the shops of Fort Union. The shops provide both shopping and office space for Midvale.

==== Bingham Junction ====
Bingham Junction, originally known as the Sharon Steel site, is on the western border of Midvale and is roughly 446 acres in size. The area originally started seeing economic development as early as 1871 as a slag site for mining, which operated as such until 1958. Upon testing, it appeared to have large amounts of lead, arsenic and heavy metals, rendering the property unusable. Through mediation, help from the EPA and other parties, the area underwent a major cleanup and restoration project that saw its name removed from the NPL in 2006.

Since Bingham Junction's removal from the NPL, the area underwent major changes. It brought about thousands of new households to the city. In connection with the added residential, major corporations moved to the area, where Overstock, CHG, and Savage now use as their headquarters. Also, other major companies have brought their operation to the area, including Marriott, Zagg and IHC. Entertainment followed with the first-ever Top Golf in Utah resides in the Bingham Junction area. As other important shopping centers such as Winco and other dining options. The EPA now considers this a success story and estimates as of 2018 there are 56 on-site businesses with at least 2,646 employees.

Bingham Junction is also home to a stop on the red line, that goes from the western edges of Salt Lake County to the University of Utah, Utah's flagship university.

==== Jordan Bluffs ====
Following in the success of the Bingham Junction Area, the area known as Jordan Bluffs is beginning the early phase of similar redevelopment. Jordan Bluffs is situated south of Bingham Junction and was originally part of the Sharon Steel slag site. It comprises 351 acres in the south west region of Midvale.

Jordan Bluffs is in the beginning phases of redevelopment, but current proposals could see an additional 3,500 housing units and over 1,000,000 square feet of office space within the next ten years.

== Transportation ==
=== Roadways ===
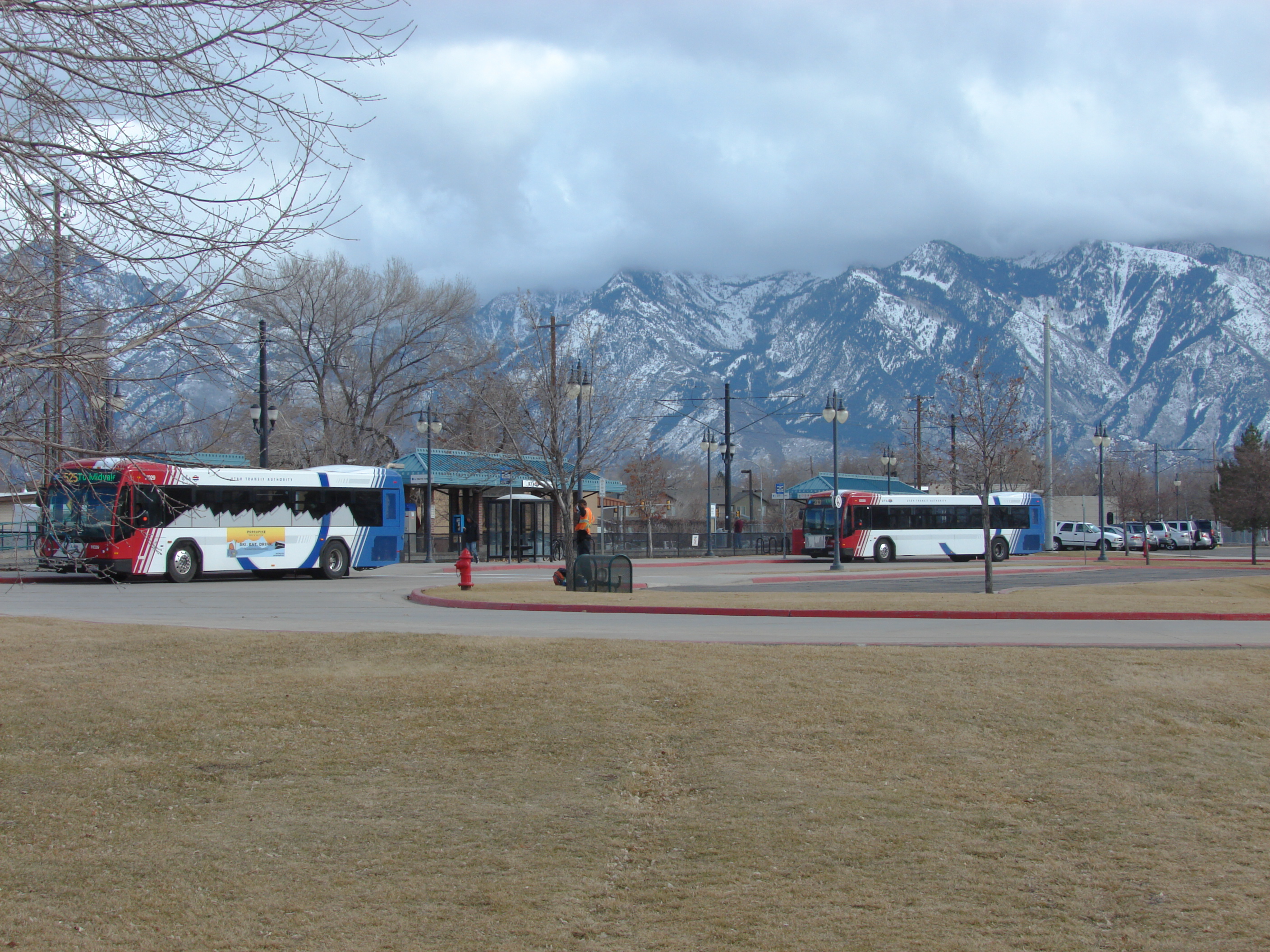

Midvale operates under a grid system as the rest of Salt Lake County. However, as most cities originally operated under their own grid system, Midvale City was one of the last to transition to the county. I-15 runs down the center of Midvale, with I-215's interchange with I-15 meeting in the 7200 South and State Street region in Midvale. 7800 South runs east/west across the center of the city, and 700 West/Main Street runs through its historic downtown.

=== Bus ===
The Utah Transit Authority (UTA) operates a bus system that reaches into the city including a ski service bus route. Bus routes serve nearby light rail stations, multiple commercial districts (including the Shops at Fort Union and the State Street commercial district), office parks, and government offices. The ski bus route operates along the 7200 south corridor.

=== Rail ===
UTA's TRAX light rail system operates two separate rail line routes in Midvale, serving both the Red Line and Blue Line. The city is home to three light rail stations: The Red Line has Bingham Junction, and the Blue Line has Midvale Fort Union and Midvale Center stations.

== Economy ==
CHG Healthcare Services, Arctic Circle Restaurants, Veritas Funding, LLC, Sportmans' Warehouse, Zagg and Overstock.com are headquartered in Midvale.

School Improvement Network, an education consulting company, moved its national headquarters to Midvale in 2011.

== Notable people ==
- Corbin Allred – Actor
- Zane Beadles – NFL player for the Jacksonville Jaguars and the Denver Broncos.
- Mary N. Cook – LDS First Counselor in the general presidency of the Young Women
- Richard Dutcher – Director, writer, producer, and actor
- J. Thomas Fyans – LDS General Authority
- Gregg Hale – guitar player for multi-platinum selling British band Spiritualized
- Kristin Hodson – Sex therapist, specialising in the topic of sexual health in the Latter-Day Saint church
- Christen Jensen – Educator and Brigham Young University interim president
- Don L. Lind – American scientist, naval officer and aviator, and NASA astronaut
- Dick Motta – NCAA Collegiate and NBA coach
- Kent Ryan – Former NFL player with the Detroit Lions
- Josh Savage – Former NFL player for the Tennessee Titans and New Orleans Saints
- Scott Young – Former NFL player for the Philadelphia Eagles and Cleveland Browns
