= Kristin Hodson =

- Born: Kristin Burnett
- Education: Weber State University, BYU-Hawaii, University of Utah
- Occupations: Licensed Clinical Social Worker, Certified Sex Therapist
- Known for: Real Intimacy: A Couples' Guide to Healthy, Genuine Sexuality

Kristin Hodson is a Licensed Clinical Social Worker, AASECT Certified Sex Therapist, and prominent voice on the topic of sexual health in the Church of Jesus Christ of Latter-day Saints community.

Hodson was born in Virginia, raised in Utah, and attended Weber State University, BYU-Hawaii, and the University of Utah. Her work as a therapist and an advocate have challenged long-held values and norms, like the 'premarital exam', among more traditional people in Utah and among members of the Church of Jesus Christ of Latter-day Saints.

== Career ==
Hodson's research includes maternal mental health, LGBT Mormon community, pornography, postpartum depression, and healthy sexuality. She is the founder and executive director of The Healing Group, a therapy practice in Midvale, Utah, and the founder of the Rocky Mountain Sex Summit. Hodson has lobbied Utah legislative sessions for more public-school sex education, making the curriculum opt-out instead of opt-in - the state’s official policy is abstinence. She is an instructor in the College Of Social Work at the University of Utah. She has also contributed to the Huffington Post Live, National Public Radio, MTV, RadioWest, Studio5, The Deseret News, and The Salt Lake Tribune.

== Personal life ==
Hodson is married and the mother of three children. She was raised in the Church of Jesus Christ of Latter Day Saints.

== Bibliography ==
- Real Intimacy: A Couples' Guide to Healthy, Genuine Sexuality by Kristin B Hodson, Alisha Worthington, and Thomas G Harrison (Cedar Fort, 14 August 2012, ISBN 978-1462110520)
