= Christen Jensen =

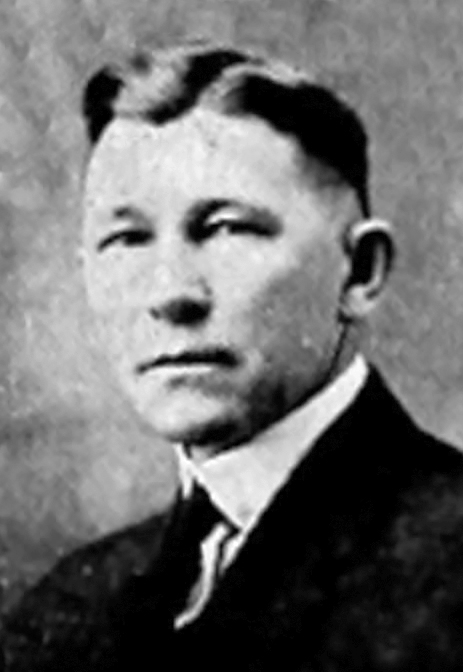
Christen Jensen 1922

Christen Jensen (1881–1961) was an American educator who twice served as interim president of Brigham Young University (BYU). The two terms were 1939-1940 while Franklin S. Harris was doing work in Iran and then in Nov. 1949-Feb. 1951 between the presidencies of Howard S. McDonald and Ernest L. Wilkinson.

Jensen was born in Salt Lake City to Christen Jensen Sr. and his wife Nel Sina Johnsen, both of whom were immigrants from Denmark. Jensen initially went through the Normal school of the University of Utah, and then was a teacher in such southern Salt Lake County towns as Midvale and Riverton as well as Pleasant Green in western Salt Lake County. While teaching in Midvale Jensen met another teacher there named Juliaetta Bateman. They had a common interest in music. They married on August 17, 1904.

Jensen then decided to pursue further studies in political science. He received his bachelor's degree from the University of Utah in 1907 and his M.A. from Harvard University in 1908.

Jensen joined the BYU faculty in 1908. In 1911 he became the chair of the BYU Department of History and Political Science. He held this position until 1949.

Jensen later took a leave to complete a Ph.D. at the University of Chicago, writing his dissertation on the history and uses of the pardoning power. Jensen served as dean of the College of Applied Science there and also from 1929 until 1949 as dean of BYU's Graduate School. He also served as dean of the BYU department of history and political science.

During Jensen's administration a requirement for taking a course in American history and government for graduation was added and the George Albert Smith Fieldhouse was built.

Jensen was a Latter-day Saint. He had many callings in the Sunday school and also served for a time as a member of the presidency of the Utah Stake, which covered Provo and its immediate vicinity. At the time of his death Jensen was serving as the Patriarch of the Provo East Stake.

== Sources ==
- Wilkinson, Ernest L., ed., Brigham Young University: The First One Hundred Years. Vol. 2, p. 486-495.; Vol. 4, p. 468-469.
- Political Research Quarterly announcement of Jensen's death
- Jensen, Julia Bateman, Little Gold Pieces 1948.
