= Sandy Expo station =

Light rail station in Sandy, Utah, United States

Sandy Expo

General information
- Location: 9375 South 150 East; Sandy, Utah; United States
- Coordinates: 40°34′53″N 111°53′11″W
- Owner: Utah Transit Authority (UTA)
- Platforms: 2 side platforms
- Tracks: 2

Construction
- Structure type: At-grade
- Accessible: Yes

History
- Opened: August 28, 2006; 19 years ago

Services
| Preceding station | Utah Transit Authority | Following station |
|---|---|---|
| Historic Sandy toward Salt Lake Central | Blue Line | Sandy Civic Center toward Draper Town Center |
Former services
| Preceding station | Utah Transit Authority | Following station |
|---|---|---|
| Historic Sandy toward University Medical Center | Sandy/University Line | Sandy Civic Center Terminus |
Location

Sandy Expo station is a light rail station in Sandy, Utah, United States, served by the Blue Line of Utah Transit Authority's TRAX light rail system. The Blue Line provides service from Downtown Salt Lake City to Draper. The station serves the nearby Mountain America Exposition Center, for which the station is named, the Jordan Commons shopping mall, and America First Field, a soccer venue that is home to Real Salt Lake.

== Description ==
The station is located at 9375 South 150 East and is accessible from the intersection of 9400 South and 150 East. There is also pedestrian and bicycle access from the Porter Rockwell Trail (Sandy rail trail) on the west side of the tracks.

The station was opened on August 28, 2006, and is operated by the Utah Transit Authority. Sandy Expo was the second infill station to be built along an existing TRAX line, after the 900 South infill station opened the previous year.

Unlike many TRAX stations, Sandy Expo does not have a Park and Ride lot. As a "destination station" it only has a drop-off/pick-up area, with no motor vehicle access to the station.
