= Kimballs Lane station =

Light rail station in Draper, Utah, United States

Kimballs Lane
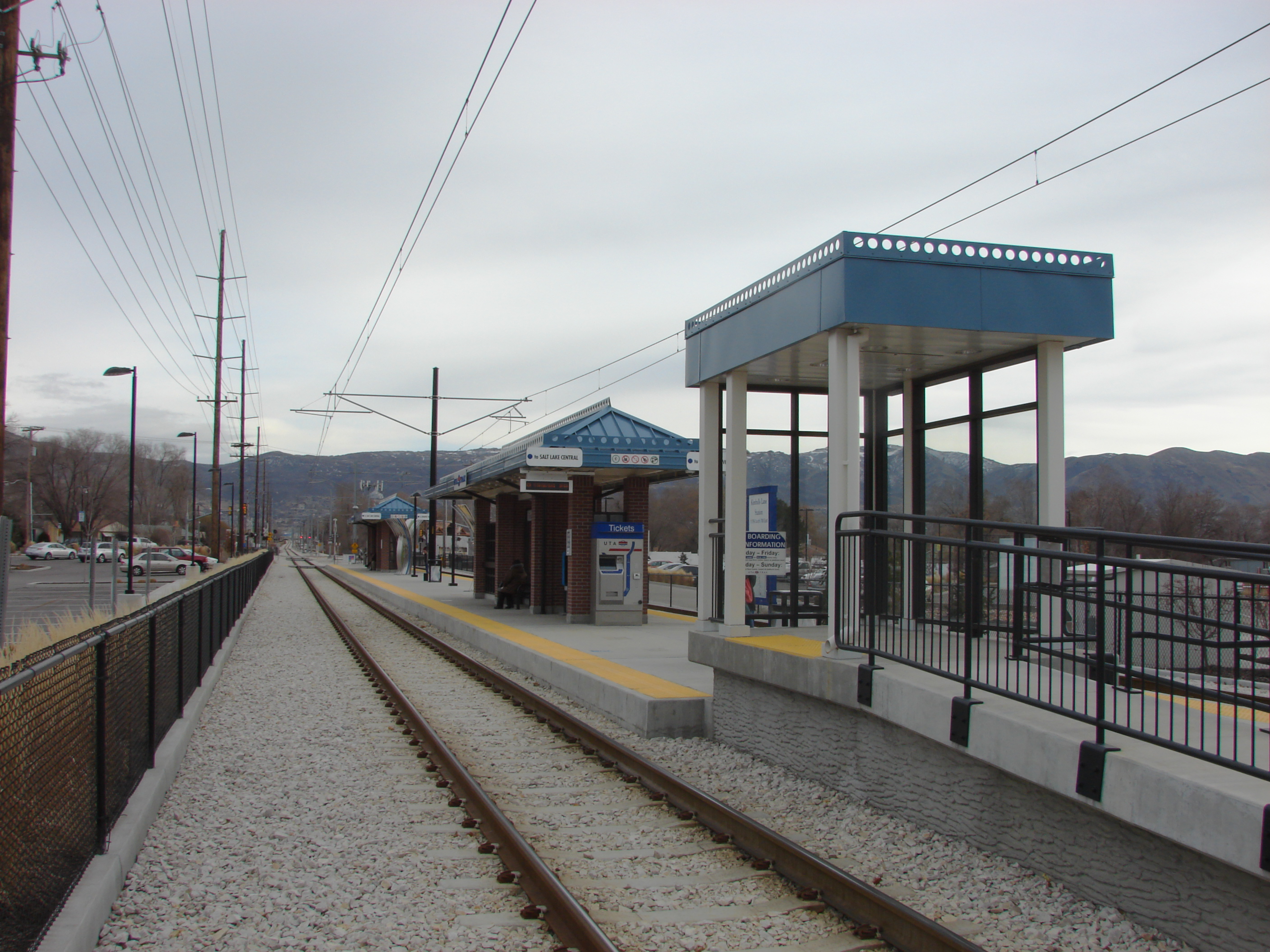

General information
- Location: 11796 South 700 East; Draper, Utah; United States
- Coordinates: 40°32′09″N 111°52′19″W
- Owner: Utah Transit Authority (UTA)
- Platforms: 1 island platform
- Tracks: 2
- Connections: UTA: On Demand South Valley

Construction
- Structure type: At-grade
- Parking: Yes
- Accessible: Yes

History
- Opened: August 18, 2013; 13 years ago

Services
Preceding station	Utah Transit Authority	Following station
Crescent View toward Salt Lake Central	Blue Line	Draper Town Center Terminus
Location

Kimballs Lane station is a light rail station in Draper, Utah, United States, served by the Blue Line of Utah Transit Authority's TRAX light rail system. The Blue Line provides service from Downtown Salt Lake City to downtown Draper.

== Description ==
The station is located at 11796 South 700 East (SR-71) and is easily accessed off that road from either 11400 South or 12300 South (Draper Parkway).

Access to the main park and ride lot (situated directly northeast of the passenger platform) is only by way of a short section of 11800 South which is directly north of the station, there is no direct access from 700 East. There is a second, smaller Park and Ride lot southwest of the passenger platform which is located at 667 East Kimballs Lane and is accessed from that road. The bus stops are located between this smaller lot and the passenger platform.

The station is located within a residential area of the city, with little commercial development nearby, however, the Skaggs Catholic Center (which includes Juan Diego Catholic High School) is several blocks west. Immediately southwest of the station is the Porter Rockwell Trail.

The station opened August 18, 2013, as part of the Draper extension of the Blue Line and is operated by Utah Transit Authority.
