= Draper Poultrymen and Egg Producers' Plant =

- U.S. National Register of Historic Places
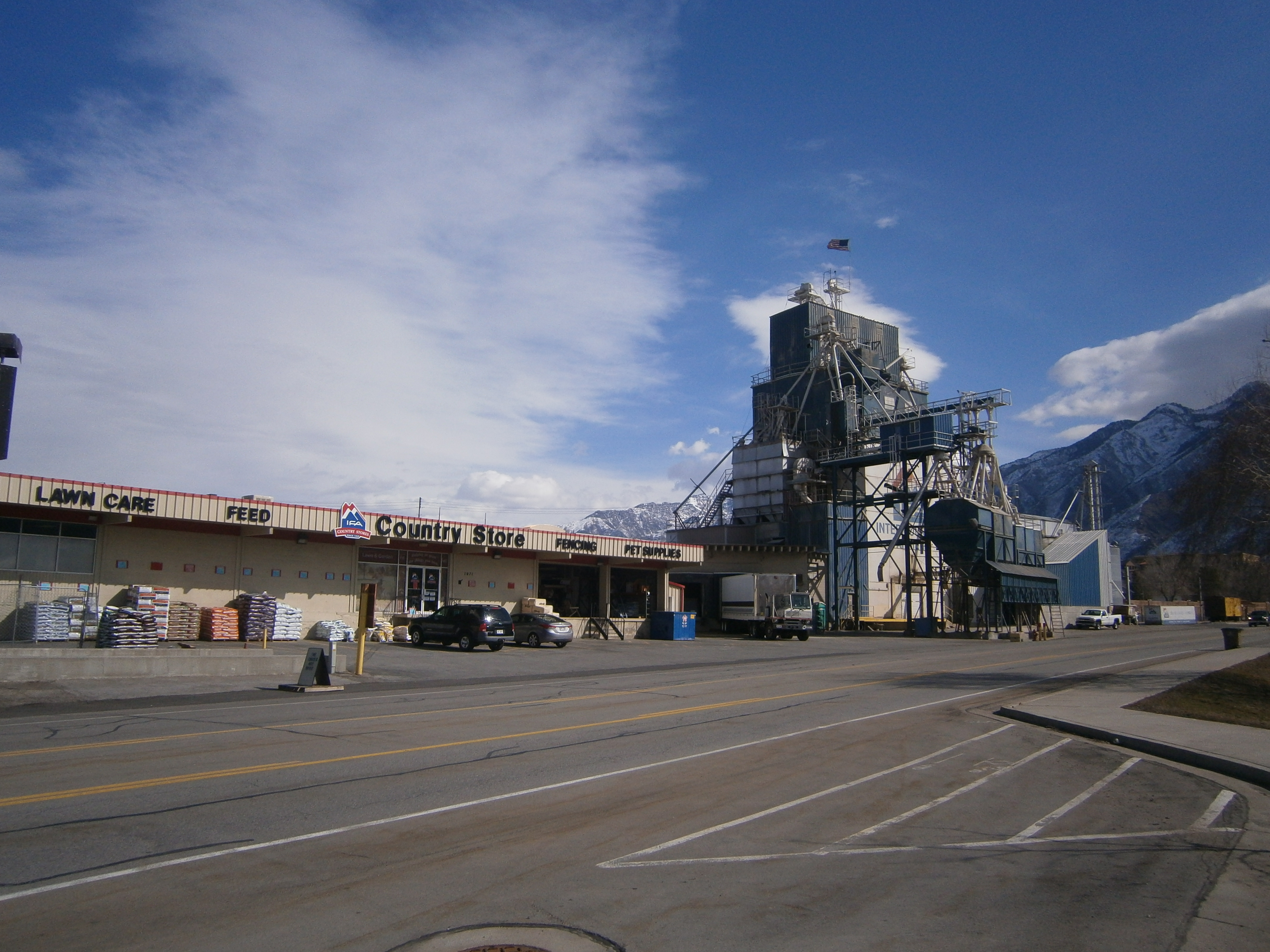

- Location within Utah Location within the United States
- Location: 1071 E. Pioneer Rd., Draper, Utah
- Coordinates: 40°31′33″N 111°51′42″W
- Area: 4.3 acres (1.7 ha)
- Built by: Vawdrey, Cyrus
- Architectural style: Modern Movement
- MPS: Draper, Utah MPS
- NRHP reference No.: 04000403
- Added to NRHP: May 6, 2004

The Draper Poultrymen and Egg Producers' Plant, located at 1071 East Pioneer Road in Draper, Utah, United States, is important in the history of Draper. Also known as the Draper Poultrymen Inc., as Draper Egg Producers Association, and as Intermountain Farmers Association, it was listed on the National Register of Historic Places in 2004.

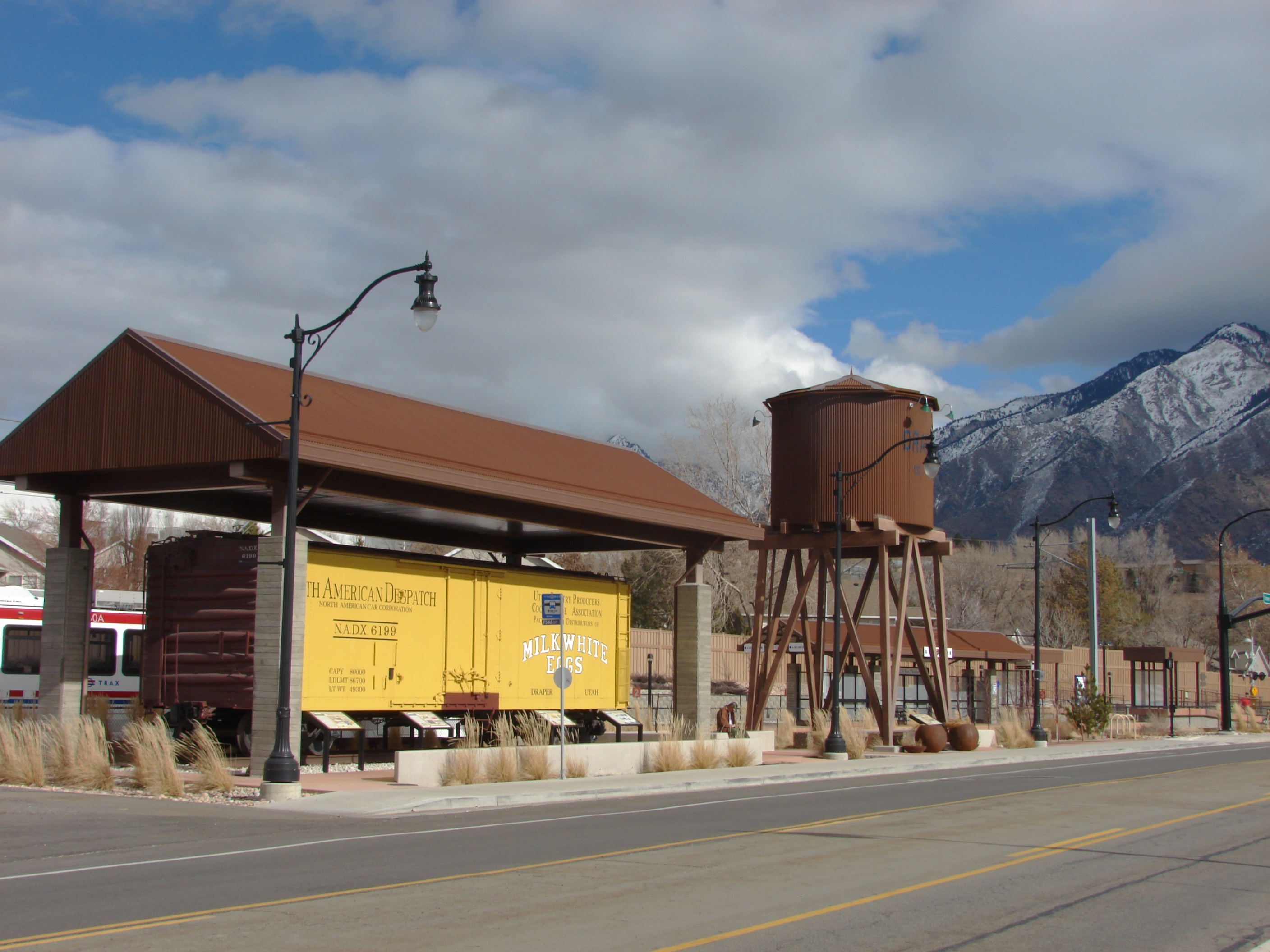
Historical display at Draper Town Center station, January 2015

The plant includes three buildings deemed contributing buildings: a store built in c.1931, a mill built in 1945, and a boiler built c.1954. A concrete-block mill warehouse built in 1967 is in Modern Movement architecture example.

In 2013, the Draper Town Center TRAX station was completed adjacent to the plant and a historic display regarding the plant was included as part of the construction.

== See also ==
- National Register of Historic Places listings in Salt Lake County, Utah
