= Non-revenue track =

Railway tracks not used by trains in regular service

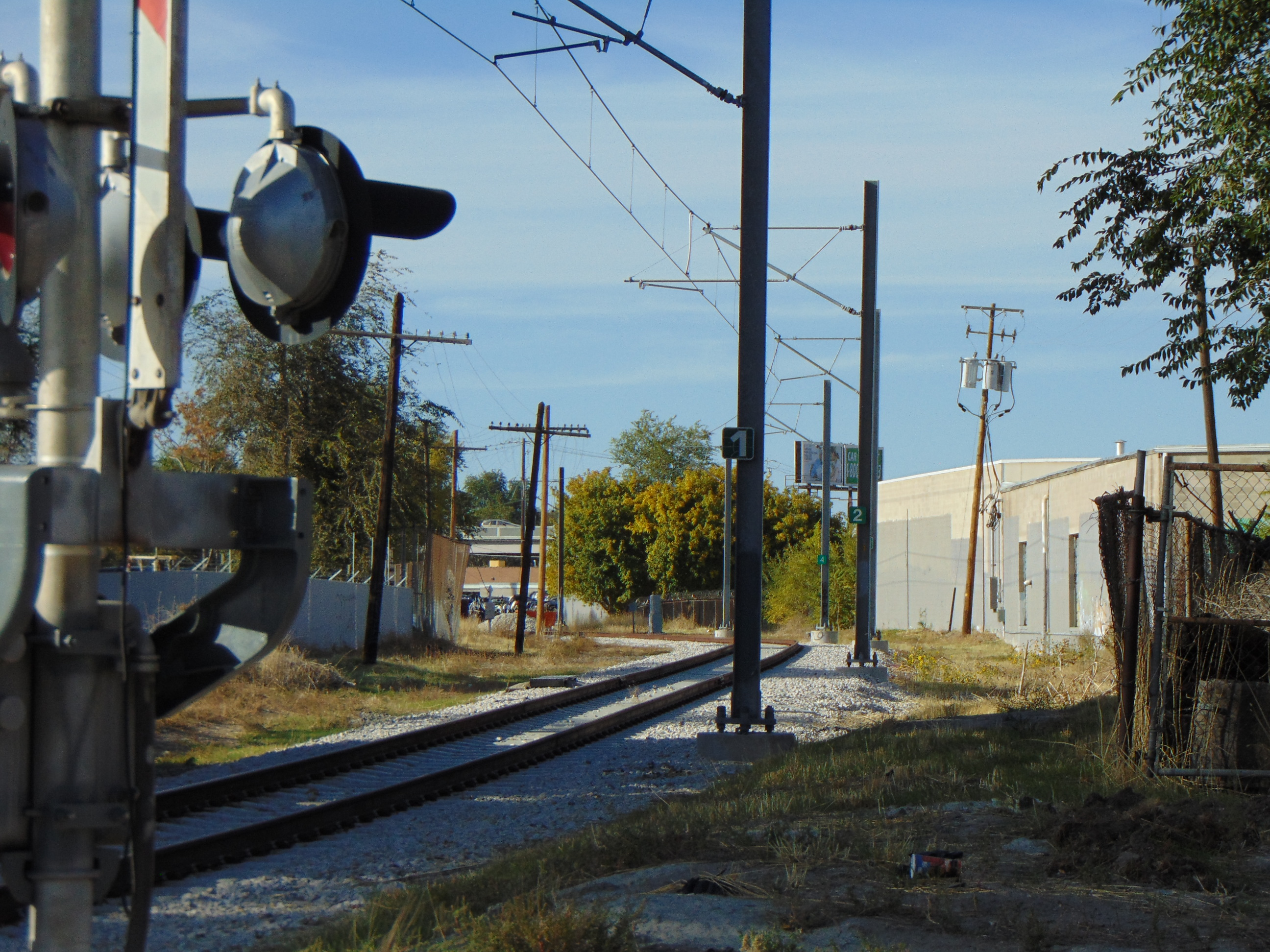
A non-revenue track on the TRAX light rail system in Salt Lake City, Utah, USA

Non-revenue track (or trackage), or a non-revenue route, is a section of track or transport route that is not used to carry revenue-earning freight or goods nor for scheduled passenger services. The term is used to refer mainly to sections of track or routes in public transport systems, such as rapid transit and tramway networks, but non-revenue track or routes can also be found in other transport systems. Non-revenue tracks may be used for revenue service during temporary reroutings.

== See also ==
- Dead mileage
- Network length (transport)
