= Sandy, Utah =

City in Salt Lake County, Utah, United States

Sandy
- City
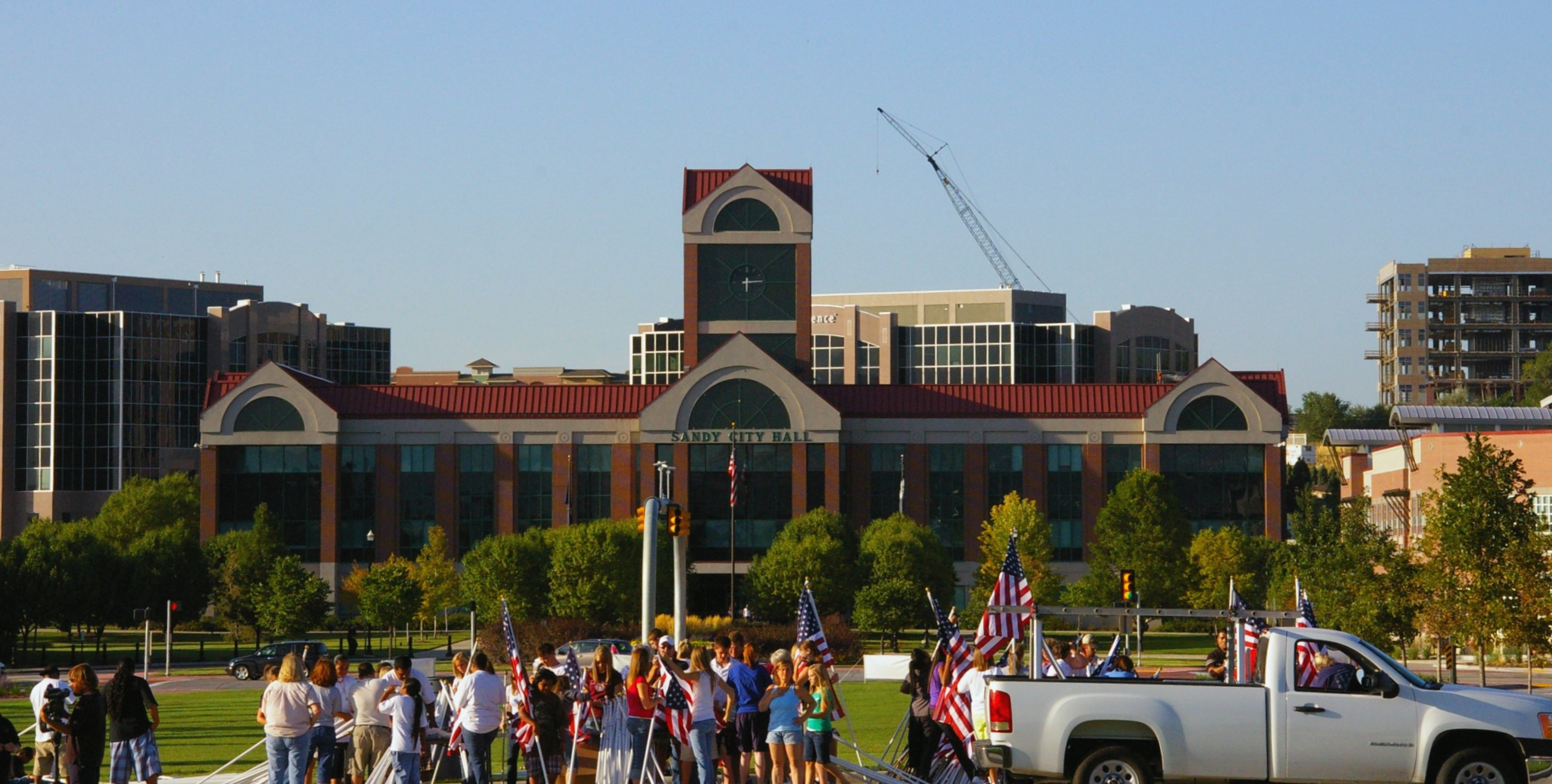
- Sandy City Hall in September, 2009

- Flag

- Location in Salt Lake County and the state of Utah.
- Coordinates: 40°34′21″N 111°51′35″W
- Country: United States
- State: Utah
- County: Salt Lake
- Founded: 1871
- Incorporated: 1893

Government
  - Mayor: Monica Zoltanski

Area
  - Total: 24.16 sq mi (62.58 km^{2})
  - Land: 24.15 sq mi (62.55 km^{2})
  - Water: 0.012 sq mi (0.03 km^{2})
- Elevation: 4,449 ft (1,356 m)

Population (2020)
  - Total: 96,904
  - Density: 4,012/sq mi (1,549/km^{2})
- Time zone: UTC−7 (MST)
  - Summer (DST): UTC−6 (MDT)
- ZIP codes: 84070, 84090-84094
- Area codes: 385, 801
- FIPS code: 49-67440
- Website: www.sandy.utah.gov

Sandy is a city in the Salt Lake City metropolitan area, located in Salt Lake County, Utah, United States. The population was 96,904 according to the 2020 United States census.

Sandy is home to the Shops at South Town shopping mall; the Jordan Commons entertainment, office and dining complex; and the Mountain America Exposition Center. It is also the location of the soccer-specific America First Field (formerly known as Rio Tinto Stadium), which hosts Real Salt Lake and Utah Royals FC home games, and opened on October 8, 2008.

The city is currently developing a walkable and transit-oriented city center called The Cairns. A formal master plan was adopted in January 2017 to accommodate regional growth and outlines developments and related guidelines through the next 25 years, while dividing the city center into distinct villages. The plan emphasizes sustainable living, walkability, human-scaled architecture, environmentally-friendly design, and nature-inspired design while managing population growth and its related challenges.

== History ==
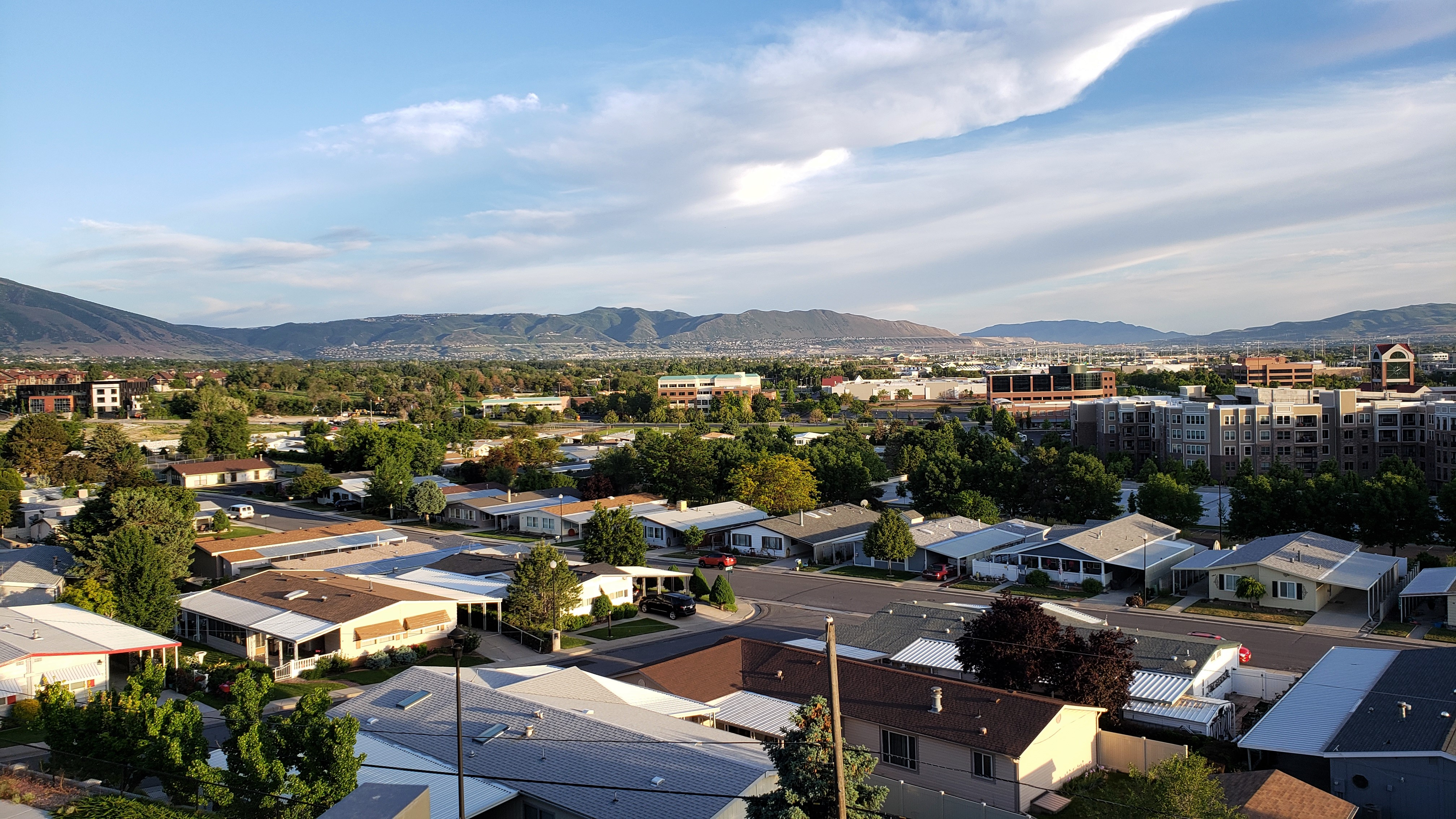
A view of Sandy City with the Point of the Mountain in the background

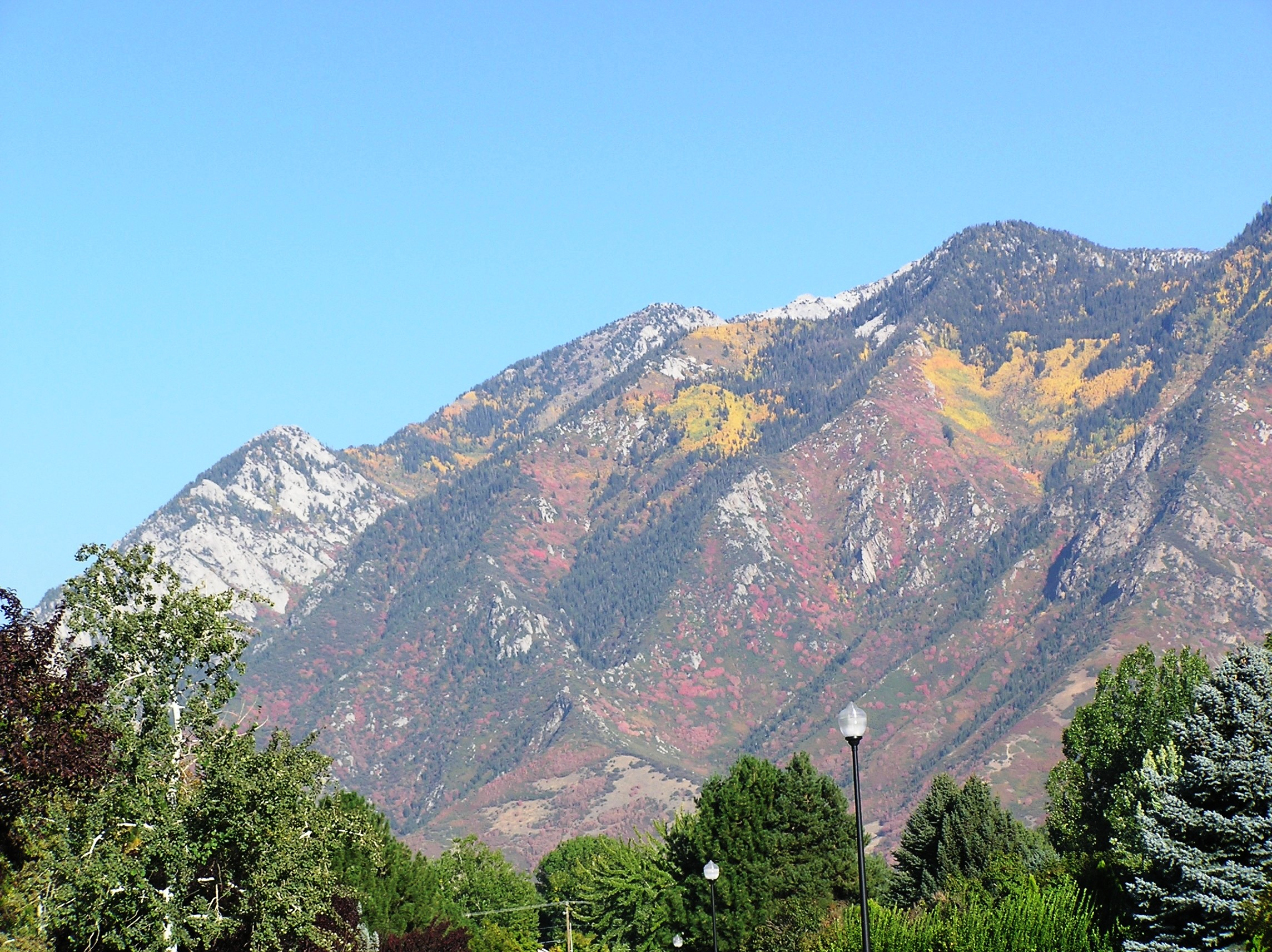
A view of the Wasatch Range from a Sandy neighborhood.

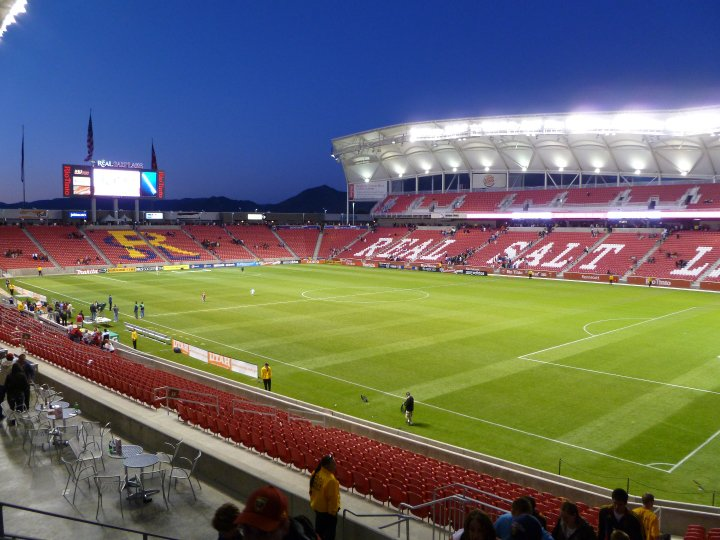
America First Field

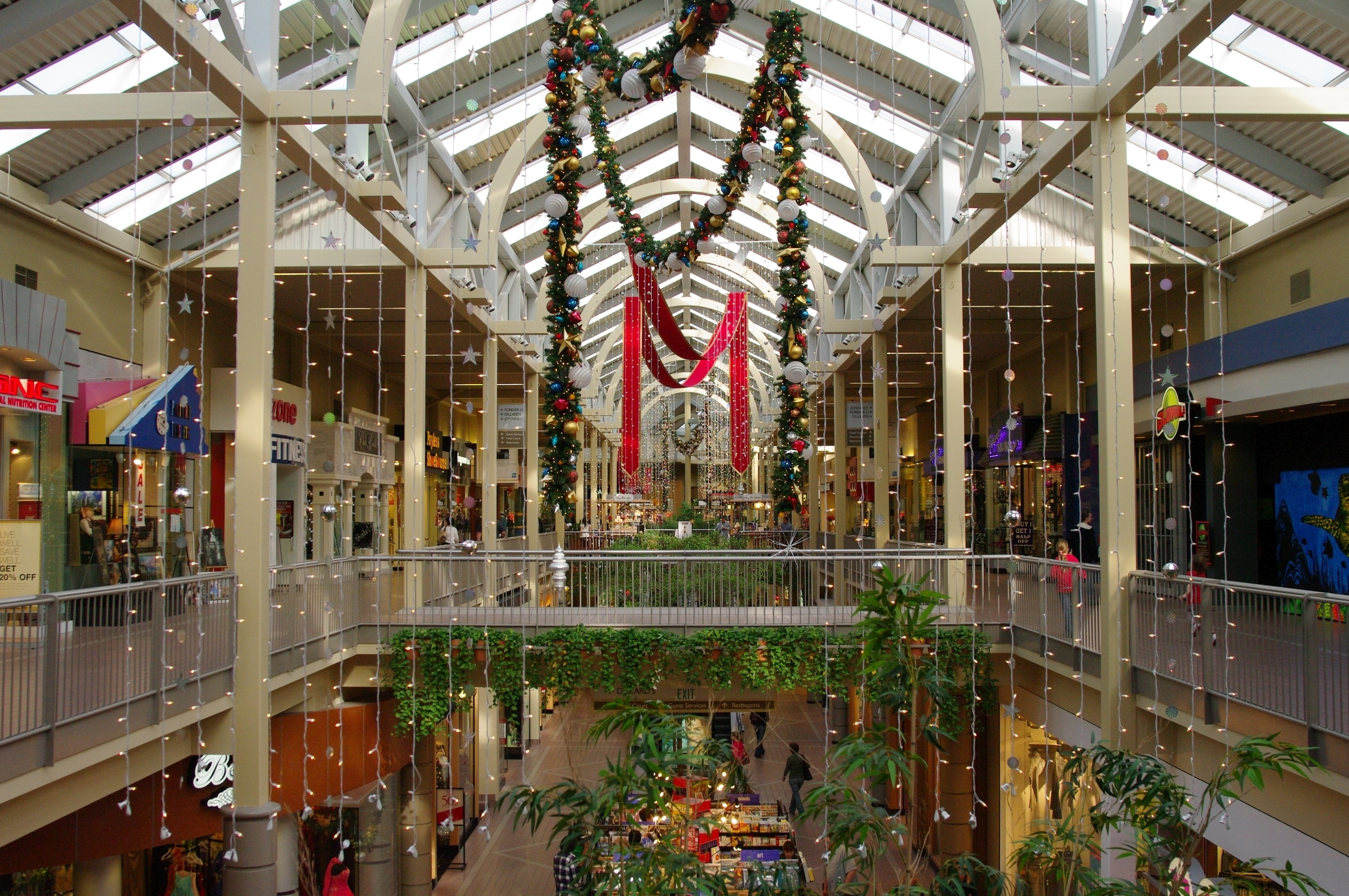
The Shops at South Town mall in Sandy, before 2017 redevelopment

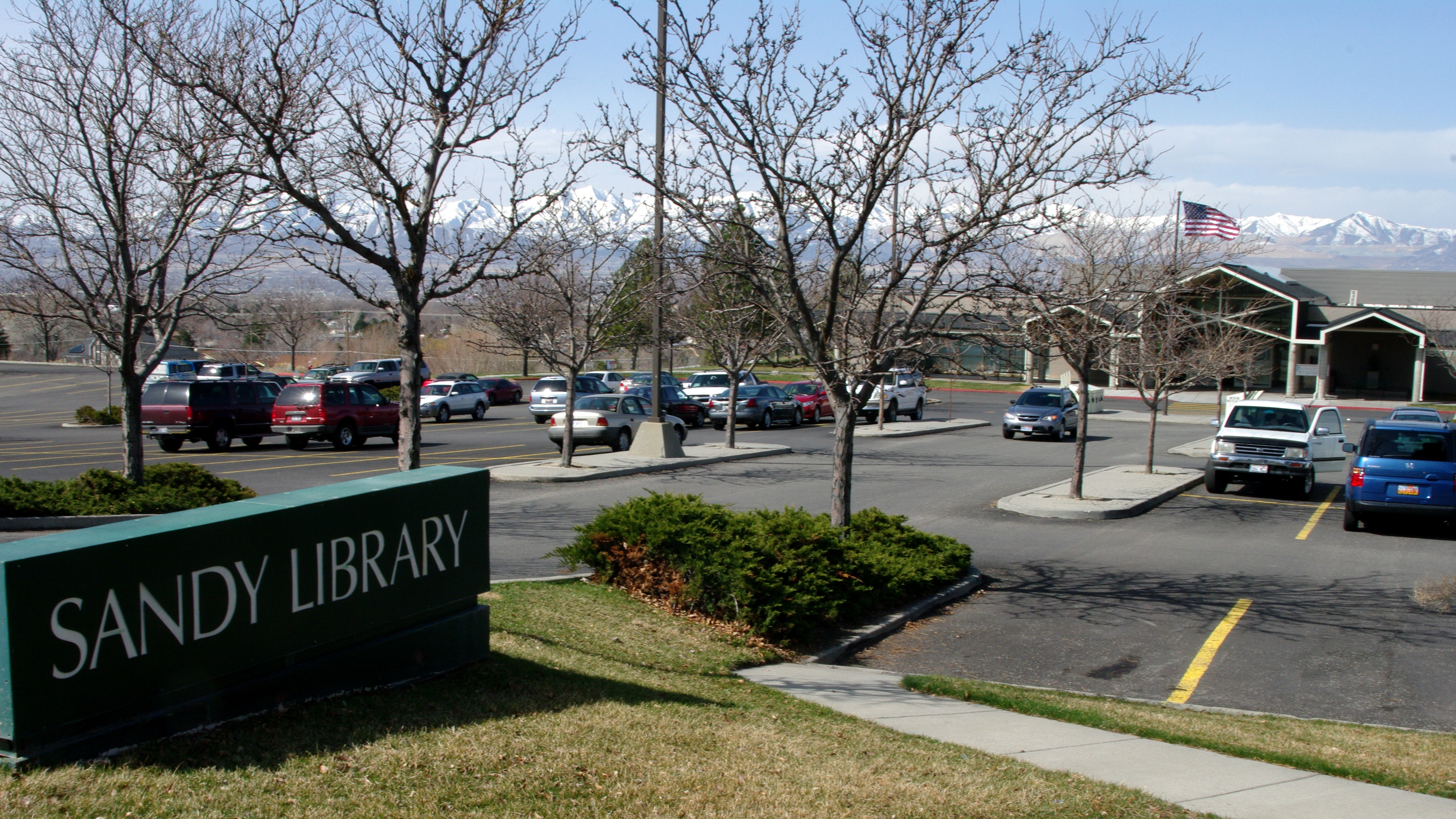
Sandy Library

=== Early settlements ===
Located at the base of the Wasatch Mountains thirteen miles (21 km) south of Salt Lake City, Sandy was a likely area for early settlement. The area was first used by nomadic bands of Paiute, Shoshone, and Bannock Indians who roamed along the base of the mountains as they travelled from their winter home at Utah Lake to their summer fishing grounds at Bear Lake.

Permanent settlers first moved into Sandy during the 1860s and 1870s because of the availability of land in the less crowded southern end of the Salt Lake Valley. The original plat was essentially one square mile, situated on an alluvial terrace running north and south along the eastern edge of the Jordan River drainage system and paralleling the mountain range.

The origin of its name has not been established with any certainty. Perhaps most widely believed is that Brigham Young named Sandy for its thirsty soil, but there is no historical evidence for this. Another theory is that the name came from a legendary and colorful Scotsman, Alexander "Sandy" Kinghorn, the engineer who ran the first train line to this end of the Salt Lake Valley. Though this seems bolstered by the original name (Sandy Station or Sandy's Station), historians consider it unlikely in view of the short period between the start of the train service and the first instances of the name.

In 1863, there were only four homes between Union (7200 South) and Dunyon (Point of the Mountain): the Thayne homestead at 6600 South and 800 East, one in Crescent, one at Dunyon, and a fourth outside present-day Sandy boundaries altogether. Within a few years, Thomas Allsop, a Yorkshire farmer who had immigrated to Utah in 1853, owned almost half of present-day Sandy from County Road to Fourth East along Alta Road to Lindell Parkway. LeGrand Young owned the land between Fourth East and State Street.

Farmers willing to try their hand at the thirsty soil that inspired Sandy's name took up land along State Street, which stretched from downtown Salt Lake City to Point of the Mountain. But it was mining that shaped Sandy's first four decades. When silver mining began in Little Cottonwood Canyon, entrepreneurs recognized Sandy's value as a supply station; soon its main street was lined with hotels, saloons, and brothels serving miners ready to spend their newly earned wages. Three major smelters were located in Sandy. They were the Flagstaff, the Mingo, and the Saturn. These made Sandy the territory's most significant smelting center for a number of years.

The railroad was also significant in determining the course of Sandy's history. Built in 1873, the railroad connected Sandy to Salt Lake City and facilitated the transportation of ore and other products both in and out of the area. A streetcar line in 1907 facilitated the transportation of locals to jobs in Salt Lake City; and the automobile later continued to serve that function.

=== Incorporation ===
Sandy was incorporated in 1893, largely as part of an effort to combat what Mormon inhabitants considered "unsavory" elements in the town. Due to its mine-based beginnings, Sandy saw some modest growth. After incorporation, it was almost as if Sandy had redefined itself. Gone were the large numbers of single, transient men. By 1900, there was only a handful of saloons and hotels, and Sandy began to more closely resemble other rural Utah towns — a place where everyone knew everyone else. Church, farming, business, and family formed the focus of the inhabitants' world.

In the late 1960s, however, this rural town dramatically changed course with its second boom. It had always been assumed by local leaders and citizens that Sandy would grow outward from its logical and historic center—the nexus of Main and Center streets. However, population growth overwhelmed the physical center as neighborhoods spread out in every direction over the land.

During the 1970s, pocket communities took shape, providing the services, schools, and shopping traditionally offered by a city. Annexation issues became prominent as Salt Lake County and Sandy vied for control over land and resources. Sandy became a collection of small local communities identified by a youthful, family-oriented population. Although it was initially perceived as a bedroom community, and often still is, it has since developed a thriving commercial center along State Street and other various arterial roads.

=== The Cairns ===
The Cairns
- City center
- Design: IBI Group
- Constructed: 2014–present
- Area: 1,100 acres (450 ha)
- Owner: City of Sandy
- Interactive map of The Cairns

In 2014, the Sandy City government revealed blueprints to redevelop 1,100 acres of Sandy's downtown area into a new resort-style city center over the next 25 years, adding high-rise multi-family residential buildings and office towers, while also renovating the Shops at South Town shopping mall. The plans will also add new multi-use trails, the new Hale Center Theatre, and other amenities. The city center project is named The Cairns, with the project stretching between 9000 South and 11400 South, and Interstate 15 to the TRAX Blue Line. The project includes the American First Field and the Mountain America Exposition Center.

The project divides the city center into distinct urban villages; the areas currently under development include:

- Central Village – An office park and retail development along State Street;
- South Village – The largest village, home to City Hall, the Hale Center Theatre, the Shops at South Town, and retail and office space; and
- East Village – A transit-oriented development focused around Sandy Civic Center TRAX light rail station, including retail, office, and multi-family residential.

The master plan also includes study areas for future development and single-use areas that are unlikely to change.

==== Progress ====
As of February 2017, the first phase of the Shops at South Town redevelopment is complete and the Central Village office towers (including a new InContact headquarters), the Hale Center Theatre, and the Park at City Center residential project are near completion. The East Village transit-oriented development is nearly halfway complete, with residential projects near completion and mixed-use projects planned for a late 2017 or early 2018 groundbreaking. Transit enhancements are planned to connect the TRAX station to the South Jordan FrontRunner station, and create a link between the active villages, by way of rubber-tire bus, trolleybus, or tram. This route has been studied and is currently under planning.

== Geography ==
According to the United States Census Bureau, the city has a total area of 22.4 square miles (58 km^{2}), of which 22.3 square miles (58 km^{2}) is land and 0.04 square miles (0.10 km^{2}) (0.09%) is water.

The major residential region of eastern Sandy sits on the slopes of the Wasatch Range while the western section lies at the bottom of the valley. Interstate 15 and State Street (US-89) run through the western portions of the city, while the Jordan River forms part of the western border with West Jordan and South Jordan.

=== Climate ===
Under the Köppen climate classification, Sandy has a humid subtropical climate (Cfa) or a humid continental climate (Dfa) depending on which variant of the system is used.

Climate data for Sandy, Utah
Month	Jan	Feb	Mar	Apr	May	Jun	Jul	Aug	Sep	Oct	Nov	Dec	Year
Record high °F (°C)	63 (17)	70 (21)	84 (29)	89 (32)	103 (39)	106 (41)	111 (44)	106 (41)	100 (38)	94 (34)	76 (24)	69 (21)	111 (44)
Mean daily maximum °F (°C)	41 (5)	47 (8)	56 (13)	65 (18)	75 (24)	87 (31)	95 (35)	94 (34)	83 (28)	69 (21)	53 (12)	42 (6)	67 (20)
Mean daily minimum °F (°C)	22 (−6)	25 (−4)	32 (0)	38 (3)	46 (8)	54 (12)	61 (16)	60 (16)	51 (11)	40 (4)	30 (−1)	22 (−6)	40 (4)
Record low °F (°C)	1 (−17)	−12 (−24)	10 (−12)	21 (−6)	21 (−6)	32 (0)	44 (7)	37 (3)	31 (−1)	18 (−8)	1 (−17)	−17 (−27)	−17 (−27)
Average precipitation inches (mm)	1.51 (38)	1.22 (31)	1.56 (40)	1.82 (46)	1.79 (45)	0.85 (22)	0.95 (24)	0.95 (24)	1.08 (27)	1.73 (44)	1.32 (34)	0.96 (24)	15.74 (400)
Source: weather.com

== Demographics ==
Historical population
Census	Pop.	Note	%±
1880	488		—
1890	1,065		118.2%
1900	1,637		53.7%
1910	1,716		4.8%
1920	1,208		−29.6%
1930	1,436		18.9%
1940	1,487		3.6%
1950	2,095		40.9%
1960	3,327		58.8%
1970	6,438		93.5%
1980	52,210		711.0%
1990	75,058		43.8%
2000	88,418		17.8%
2010	87,461		−1.1%
2020	96,904		10.8%
U.S. Decennial Census

=== Racial and ethnic composition ===
Sandy, Utah – Racial and ethnic composition Note: the US Census treats Hispanic/Latino as an ethnic category. This table excludes Latinos from the racial categories and assigns them to a separate category. Hispanics/Latinos may be of any race.
Race / Ethnicity (NH = Non-Hispanic)	Pop 2000	Pop 2010	Pop 2020	% 2000	% 2010	% 2020
White alone (NH)	80,523	75,260	76,172	91.07%	86.05%	78.61%
Black or African American alone (NH)	404	558	866	0.46%	0.64%	0.89%
Native American or Alaska Native alone (NH)	269	335	376	0.30%	0.38%	0.39%
Asian alone (NH)	1,894	2,599	4,020	2.14%	2.97%	4.15%
Pacific Islander alone (NH)	260	541	659	0.29%	0.62%	0.68%
Other race alone (NH)	67	124	463	0.08%	0.14%	0.48%
Mixed race or Multiracial (NH)	1,126	1,597	3,925	1.27%	1.83%	4.05%
Hispanic or Latino (any race)	3,875	6,447	10,423	4.38%	7.37%	10.76%
Total	88,418	87,461	96,904	100.00%	100.00%	100.00%

=== 2020 census ===
As of the 2020 census, Sandy had a population of 96,904. The median age was 36.7 years. 25.4% of residents were under the age of 18 and 15.1% of residents were 65 years of age or older. For every 100 females there were 98.5 males, and for every 100 females age 18 and over there were 96.6 males age 18 and over.

99.9% of residents lived in urban areas, while 0.1% lived in rural areas.

There were 33,453 households in Sandy, of which 35.5% had children under the age of 18 living in them. Of all households, 59.9% were married-couple households, 14.2% were households with a male householder and no spouse or partner present, and 20.6% were households with a female householder and no spouse or partner present. About 19.0% of all households were made up of individuals and 7.9% had someone living alone who was 65 years of age or older.

There were 34,788 housing units, of which 3.8% were vacant. The homeowner vacancy rate was 0.6% and the rental vacancy rate was 7.3%.

Racial composition as of the 2020 census
Race	Number	Percent
White	78,540	81.0%
Black or African American	978	1.0%
American Indian and Alaska Native	597	0.6%
Asian	4,078	4.2%
Native Hawaiian and Other Pacific Islander	686	0.7%
Some other race	3,968	4.1%
Two or more races	8,057	8.3%
Hispanic or Latino (of any race)	10,423	10.8%

=== 2010 census ===
The city population remained the sixth largest in Utah; as of the 2010 census, there were 87,418 people, 28,296 households, and 22,553 families residing in the city.

As of the 2010 census, the race and ethnicity compositions of the city were 90.0% White, 3.0% Asian, 0.7% Black, 0.6% Pacific Islander, 0.5% Native American, 2.6% from other races, and 2.5% from two or more races. Hispanic or Latino of any race were 7.4% of the population.

In the city, the population was spread out, with 31.3% aged 19 and under, 13.3% from 20 to 29, 19.2% from 29 to 44, 26.9% from 45 to 64, and 9.3% who were 65 years of age or older. The median age was 29 years. For every 100 females, there were 99.3 males. For every 100 females age 18 and over, there were 96.8 males.

There were 28,296 households, out of which 38.0% had children under the age of 18 living with them, 66.1% were married couples living together, 9.5% had a female householder with no husband present, and 20.3% were non-families. 15.8% of all households were made up of individuals, and 5.9% had someone living alone who was 65 years of age or older. The average household size was 3.08 and the average family size was 3.45.

The median income for a household in the city was $76,904, and the median income for a family was $84,770. Full-time year-around male workers had a median income of $59,108 versus $40,506 for female workers. The per capita income for the city was $30,952, 7.8% of the population and 6.1% of families were below the poverty line. Of the total population, 11.0% of those under the age 18 and 4.3% of those 65 and older were living below the poverty line.

== Education ==
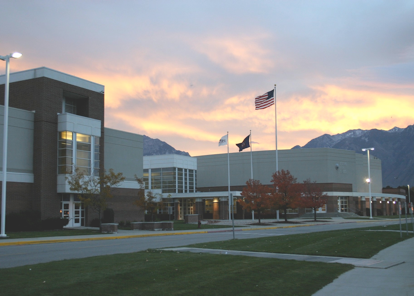
Jordan High School.

Jordan School District was the primary school district in Sandy until 2009. In 2007, citizens voted to split Jordan School District to create 2 separate school districts - Jordan School District and the newly created Canyons School District. The Canyons School District is now the primary school district located in Sandy. It began operation at the beginning of the 2009–10 school year.

Sandy has 18 elementary schools (Alta View, Altara, Bell View, Brookwood, Crescent, East Sandy, Edgemont, Granite, Lone Peak, Oakdale, Park Lane, Peruvian Park, Quail Hollow, Sandy, Silver Mesa, Sprucewood, Sunrise, Willow Canyon), six middle schools (Albion, Crescent View, Eastmont, Indian Hills, Mount Jordan, Union), five high schools (Corner Canyon, Jordan, Hillcrest, Brighton, and Alta), one technical school (Canyons Technical Education Center—CTEC), and one alternative high school (Southpointe). The Blessed Sacrament School is a private Catholic elementary school.

Salt Lake Community College's Miller Campus is located in Sandy, and is home to the college's Automotive Training Center, Culinary Institute, Miller Business Resource Center for corporate training programs, and training facilities for the Utah Department of Public Safety. Sandy is also home to a continuing education campus for non-traditional students at the University of Utah, opened in 2015.

== Sports ==
Sandy is home to Real Salt Lake, a Major League Soccer team established in 2004 that plays at the America First Field on the city's west side, and the Utah Royals, a National Women's Soccer League team that also shares America First Field. The city is also the home of the Utah Mammoth practice facility, and will be home to a new practice facility for the Utah Jazz in 2027.

Beginning in 2028, Sandy will be the home of the Utah UFL team.

Club	League	Venue	Established	Titles
Real Salt Lake	Major League Soccer	America First Field	2004	1
Utah Royals FC	National Women's Soccer League	America First Field	2017 (Note: Deactivated from 2020 to 2023.)	0

== Transportation ==
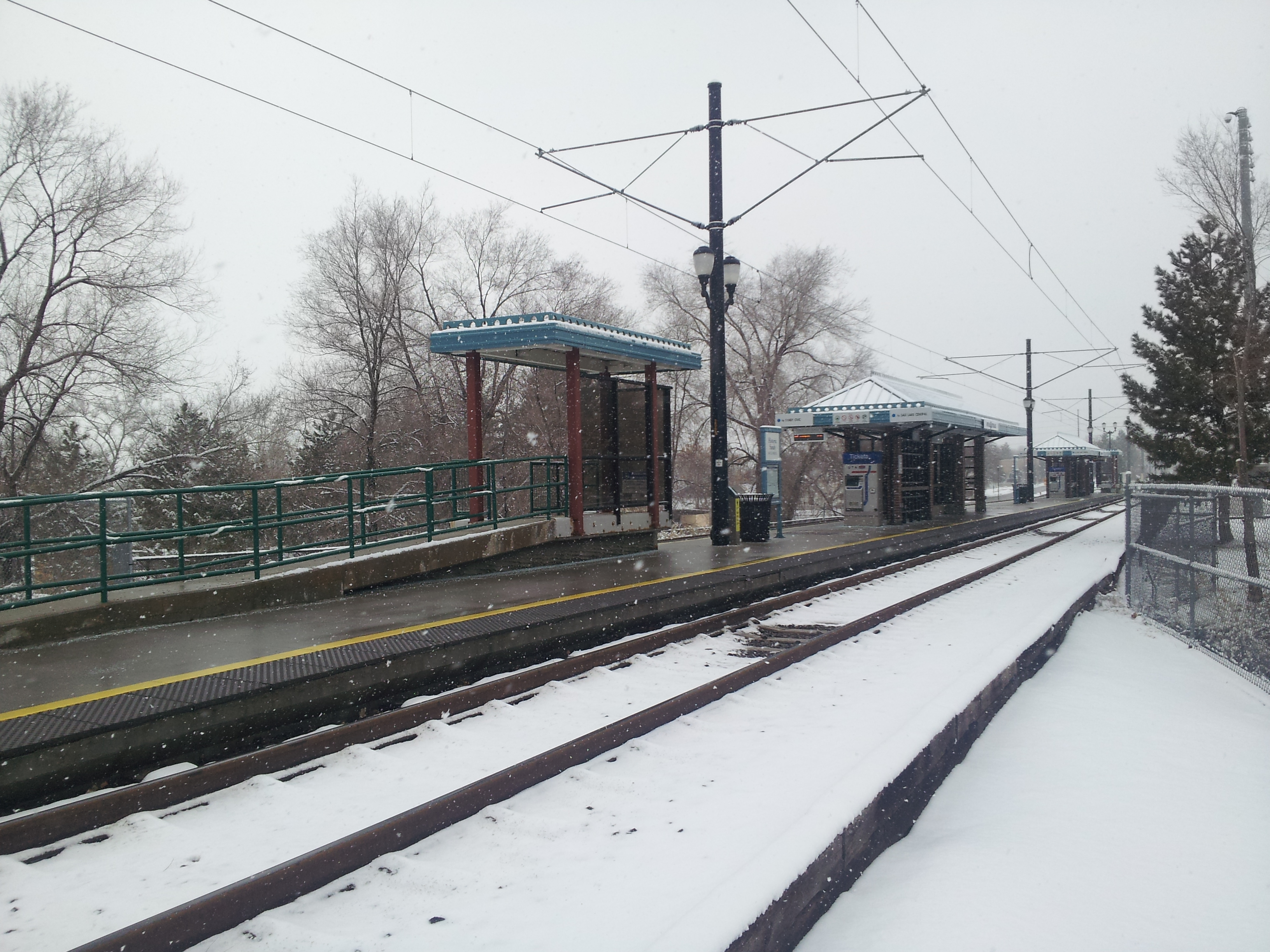
Historic Sandy TRAX station.

=== Roadways ===
The city's roads are located on the same grid system as the rest of Salt Lake County. I-15 runs down the western side of Sandy, with three exits (at 9000 South, 10600 South and 11400 South) located in the city. An additional ramp was built in early 2017 to connect the 10600 South northbound off-ramp to Monroe Street. U.S. Route 89 runs parallel to I-15 through the city as State Street, and Utah State Route 209 runs east/west, terminating within the Wasatch Range at Alta Ski Resort.

=== Bus ===
The Utah Transit Authority (UTA) operates a bus system that reaches into the city (including two normal routes, three FLEX routes, and one ski service route). Bus routes serve nearby light rail stations, commercial districts (including the Shops at South Town and the State Street commercial district), office parks, and government offices. The ski bus route operates from Historic Sandy TRAX station to Alta Ski Area and Snowbird and runs seasonally.

Sandy and UTA are currently developing a circulator bus or trolley route between Sandy Civic Center TRAX station and South Jordan FrontRunner station. The route, not yet in service, will have the potential to convert into a streetcar route in the distant future. A feasibility study was conducted by UTA in 2015, outlining the need for a circulator route, which was established into Sandy's long-term city center plan in January 2017. The route will incorporate a dedicated transit guideway on 10200 S over or under Interstate 15.

=== Rail ===
UTA's TRAX light rail system operates in Sandy. The city is home to four light rail stations: Historic Sandy at 9000 South; Sandy Expo, an infill station at 9375 South, serving the Mountain America Exposition Center and America First Field; Sandy Civic Center at 10000 South, serving the city center and nearby transit-oriented developments; and Crescent View at 11400 South. All of Sandy's light rail stations are on the Blue Line, terminating at Salt Lake Central Station to the north and Draper Town Center to the south.

== Notable people ==
- Dee Benson - jurist for the District Court for the District of Utah and soccer player
- Ryon Bingham - professional football player
- John Brzenk - professional arm-wrestler
- William T. Fairbourn - Marine Corps Major General
- Jim Fullington - professional wrestler
- Bonnie Gritton - pianist and professor
- Derek Hough - professional dancer
- Julianne Hough - professional dancer
- DaMarques Johnson - mixed martial artist
- Sean O'Connell - mixed martial artist
- Doug Jolley - professional American football player
- Megan Joy - finalist on American Idol (season 8)
- Karl Meltzer - ultra-marathon runner, 2006 North-American ultra-runner of the year by UltraRunning Magazine
- Craig Richard Nelson - actor and director
- Grant H. Palmer - historian and author
- Jamie Pierre - professional freeskier
- Katie Ann Powell - Miss District of Columbia 2024
- Dalton Schultz, professional football player
- Apa Sherpa - co-record holder for reaching the summit of Mt. Everest (21 times)
- Dick Simon - race car driver
- Mike Weir - professional golfer
- Mary Elizabeth Winstead - actress
- Brian David Mitchell and Wanda Elaine Barzee, kidnappers of Elizabeth Smart
- Elizabeth Smart, kidnapping victim and activist
- Daisy C. Allen, Utah State Legislator in 1917

== In the media ==
- The 1992 TV movie Deliver Them From Evil: The Taking of Alta View is based on the Alta View Hospital hostage incident that took place in Sandy in 1991.
- Elizabeth Smart was discovered walking down the street with her captors in Sandy nine months after being abducted from her home, an event dramatized in the CBS movie The Elizabeth Smart Story.
- The fictional HBO drama Big Love is set in Sandy.

== Local media ==
- Sandy City Journal, tabloid-style newspaper covering local government, schools, sports, and features.

== Sister cities ==
Sandy has two official sister cities as recognized by Sister Cities International.

City	Country	Since	References
Riesa	Germany	2002	
Piedras Negras	Mexico	2002	

== See also ==
- Sandy, Utah attack
