= Sandy Civic Center station =

Light rail station in Sandy, Utah, United States

Sandy Civic Center
- Sandy Civic Center station platform with bus stops and transit-oriented development in the distance

General information
- Location: 115 East Sego Lily Drive; Sandy, Utah; United States
- Coordinates: 40°34′15″N 111°53′05″W
- Owner: Utah Transit Authority (UTA)
- Platforms: 1 island platform and 1 side platform
- Tracks: 2
- Connections: UTA: 201, 219, F514, F525, 871

Construction
- Structure type: At-grade
- Cycle facilities: Racks, 9 lockers
- Accessible: Yes

History
- Opened: December 4, 1999; 26 years ago

Services
Preceding station	Utah Transit Authority	Following station
Sandy Expo toward Salt Lake Central	Blue Line	Crescent View toward Draper Town Center
Former services
Preceding station	Utah Transit Authority	Following station
Sandy Expo toward University Medical Center	Sandy/University Line	Terminus
Location

Sandy Civic Center station is a light rail station in Sandy, Utah, United States serviced by the Blue Line of Utah Transit Authority's TRAX light rail system. The Blue Line provides service from Downtown Salt Lake City to Draper. Prior to the opening of the Draper extension in 2013, this station was the southernmost on the Blue Line. The station opened on December 4, 1999, as part of the first operating segment of the TRAX system on the Sandy/University Line.

== Description ==
The Sandy Civic Center station is located at 115 East Sego Lily Drive (10000 South) and is easily accessed from State Street (US-89) by heading east on Sego Lily Drive or from 700 East (SR-71) by heading west on Sego Lily Drive. The station is just southeast of Jordan High School on a hill overlooking Sandy's downtown area and major destinations such as the Shops at South Town to the west.

The station has a free Park and Ride lot; previously, it had nearly 1,200 free parking spaces available, though surface parking is being removed and developed into apartments, offices, and retail. The park-and-ride will soon relocate to a new parking garage serving Sandy's East Village developments.

== The East Village ==
The station is home to Sandy's first transit-oriented development known as the East Village, a 32-acre (130,000 m^{2}) project part of Sandy City's revitalization plan. The East Village is under construction as of March 2017, with three multi-family residential buildings complete and one under construction; one office building complete and others under development; and retail space under planning for a late 2017 groundbreaking. When complete, the development will contain about 500,000 square feet (46,000 m^{2}) of commercial development including offices and small-format retail, 1,122 apartment units, and 1,450,000 square feet (135,000 m^{2}) of development in total.

== Bus connections ==
Bus routes are current as of Change Day on April 18, 2021.

- UTA Route 201 – State Street South
- UTA Route F514 – 300 West Flex
- UTA Route F546 – Draper Flex
