= The Shops at South Town =

Coordinates: 40°33′45″N 111°53′41″W

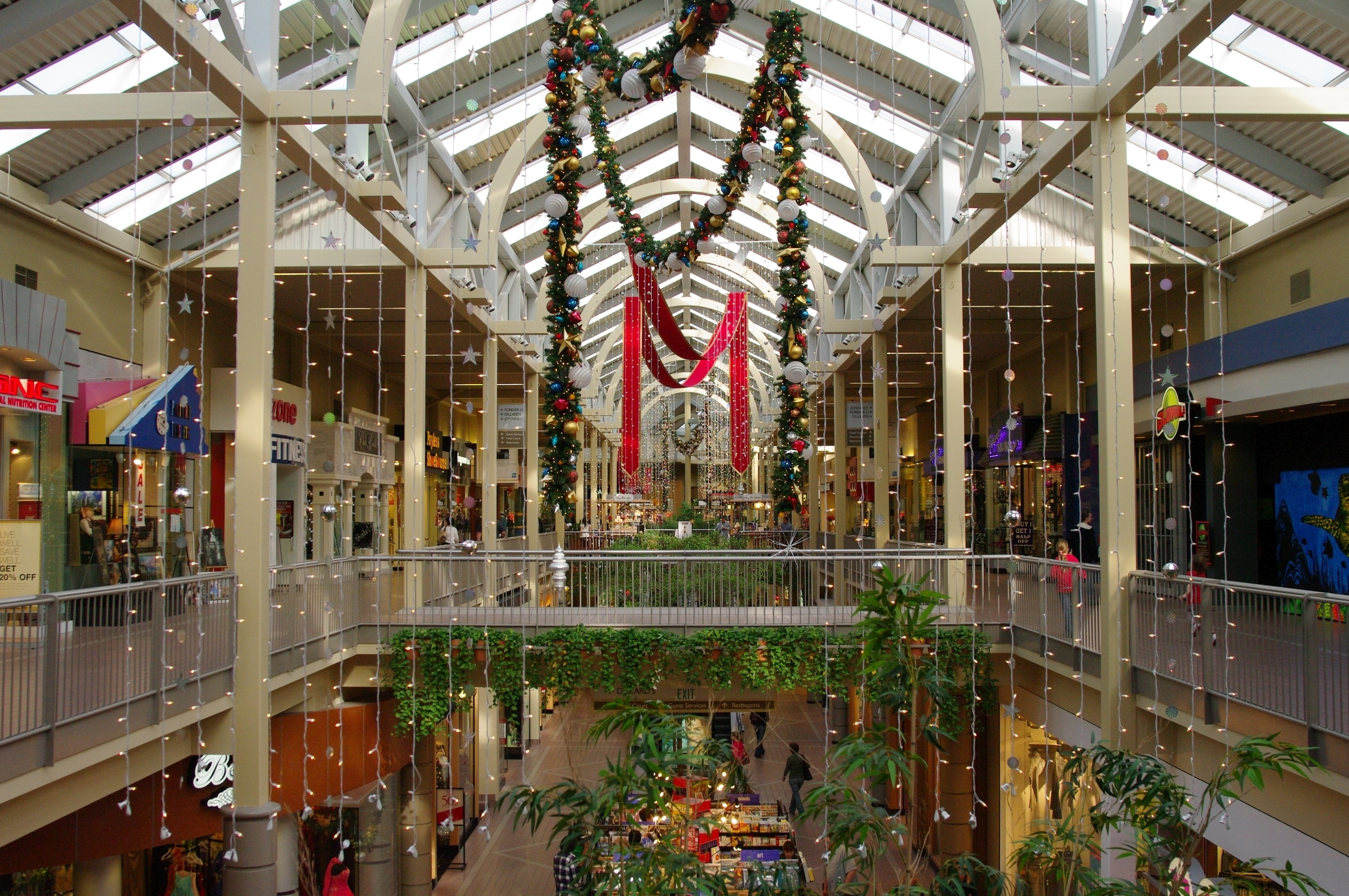
- Interior of South Towne Center during Christmas/before remodel
- Location: Sandy, Utah, U.S.
- Opened: 1986
- Manager: Smith Entertainment Group
- Owner: Smith Entertainment Group
- Num. of stores: 150
- Num. of anchor tenants: 5
- Floor area: 1,300,000 square feet (120,000 m^{2})
- Floors: 2
- Website: shopsatsouthtown.com

The Shops at South Town, formerly South Towne Center, is a regional mid-scale shopping mall in Sandy, Utah, United States, located just east of Interstate 15 on State Street. The property, built in 1986, contains 1,300,000 square feet (120,000 m^{2}) of retail space with 150 stores and restaurants. The mall currently houses multiple national retailers such as H&M, BoxLunch, Victoria's Secret, Hot Topic, Buckle and many more. It has 5 anchor spaces with a plot for a sixth that has never been built. The anchor stores are Round 1 Entertainment, HomeGoods, JCPenney, Utah Mammoth Ice Center, and Automotive Addiction.

== History ==
The mall opened in 1986 with a single anchor being ZCMI (later Meier & Frank then Macy's). A Cineplex Odeon cinema opened in 1990 as the largest cinema in the state at the time with 2,350 seats spread across 10-screens. It closed in February 2001 as part of Loews Cineplex Entertainment bankruptcy. The building was gutted in 2002 now housing a REI sports store and Momentum Indoor Climbing. JCPenney opened in 1992. Mervyns (later Forever 21) was added in 1994. A Montgomery Ward was planned to open in 1995 but fell through and the anchor pad remains empty to this day. Dillard's opened in 1997 and was the largest retail store in the state at the time of opening.

The mall underwent the first phase of an interior and exterior remodel from 2015 to 2017, and was officially unveiled on February 14, 2017. Phase 2 is currently underway. The redevelopment is part of Sandy's 1,100-acre (4,500,000 m^{2}) city center development project, The Cairns.

In early 2013, former management company Macerich announced that they put the mall up for sale and had several interested buyers. It has since been purchased and, as of February 2017, is currently managed by Pacific Retail.

In May 2017, it was announced that a Round One Entertainment location (now open) would be coming to the mall in August 2018 as part of the mall's ongoing renovation. Other renovations in the second phase of redevelopment include remodeling the former Dillard's space; extending the concourse to include Round 1 Entertainment, and HomeGoods along with other shops; remodeling an atrium and adding skylights; additional lounge seating, digital kiosks, and exterior glazing; and a new play area for children. In October 2019, following the Chapter 11 bankruptcy of Forever 21, it was announced that the South Town location would close by the end of the year unless agreements were made with the landlord. The location closed the following January.

On January 6, 2021, it was announced that Macy's would close in mid-2021 as part of a plan to close 46 stores nationwide. After Macy's closed, JCPenney was the only traditional anchor store left. As of 2023, the former Forever 21 space was being used as a hot tub outlet store, the former Macy's space was being used as an art gallery called Dreamscapes on the top floor, the bottom floor was a large vintage and exotic car museum called Automotive Addiction.

On May 6, 2024, it was announced that Smith Entertainment Group was under contract to purchase the mall, and that they intended to construct a training facility and team offices for the Utah Mammoth within the site of the mall. The mall will remain open to the public. It was later announced that the former Macy's would be remodeled and expanded for the training facility, forcing the Dreamscapes immersive art exhibit to relocate to a new location outside of the mall, and for Automotive Addiction to relocate to the former Forever 21 space at the north end of the mall. The Mammoth's practice facility was completed in September 2025. In October 2025, the Smith Entertainment Group announced plans to also construct a new practice facility for the Utah Jazz within the site of the mall. In May 2026, the Smith Entertainment Group and Intermountain Health announced a partnership that would include construction of a sports medicine center alongside the practice facilities for the Mammoth and Jazz, providing healthcare services to both of the teams as well as being open to the public.
