= Draper Town Center station =

Light rail station in Draper, Utah, United States

Draper Town Center
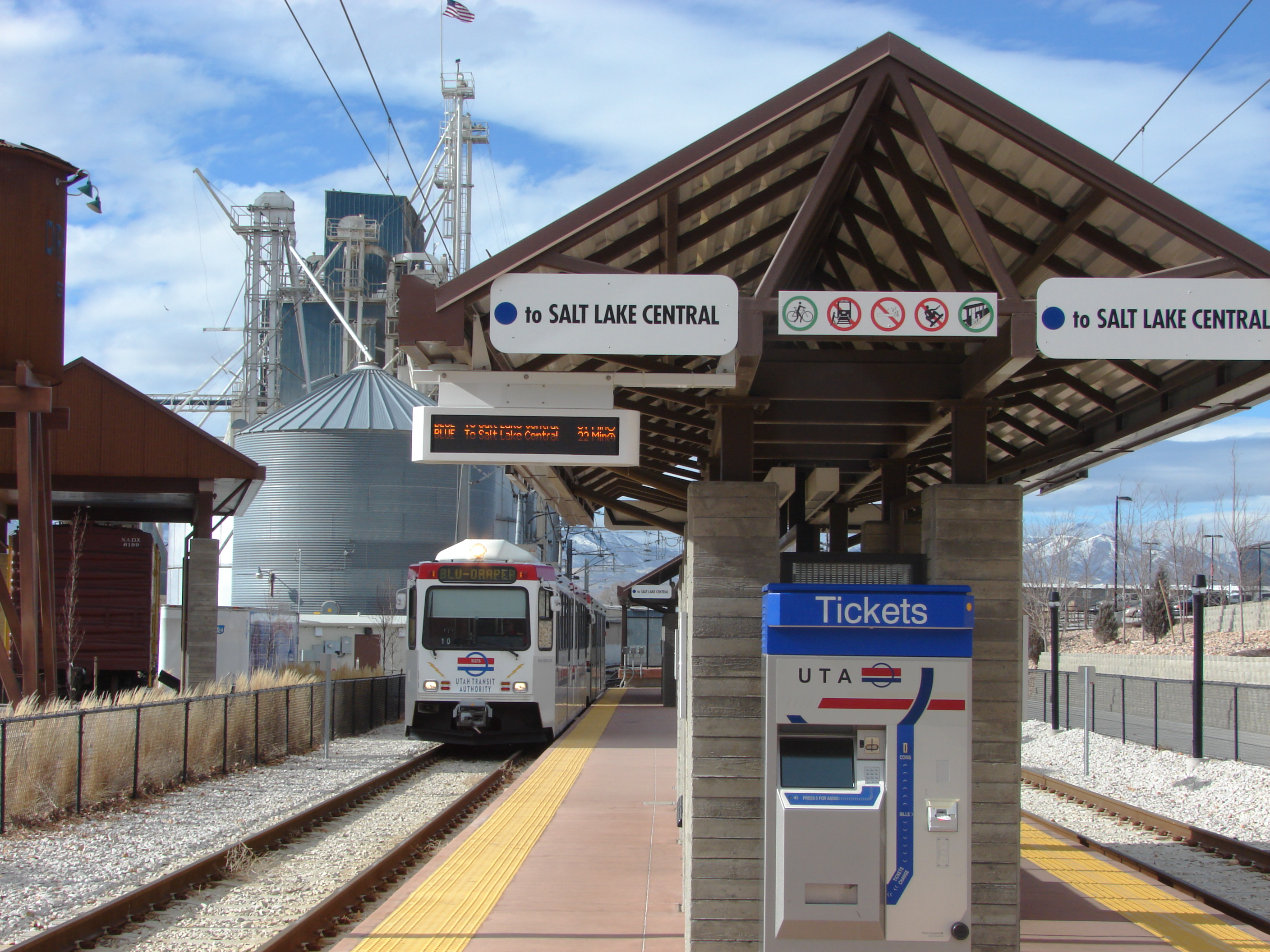
- Draper Town Center station platform

General information
- Location: 1131 East Pioneer Road (12400 South); Draper, Utah; United States
- Coordinates: 40°31′32″N 111°51′33″W
- Owner: Utah Transit Authority (UTA)
- Platforms: 1 island platform
- Tracks: 2
- Connections: UTA: 126, On Demand South Valley

Construction
- Structure type: At-grade
- Parking: Yes
- Accessible: Yes

History
- Opened: August 18, 2013; 13 years ago

Services
Preceding station	Utah Transit Authority	Following station
Kimballs Lane toward Salt Lake Central	Blue Line	Terminus
Location

Draper Town Center station is a light rail station located in Draper, Utah, United States, served by the TRAX Blue Line of the Utah Transit Authority's (UTA) TRAX system. The Blue Line provides service north from this station to Downtown Salt Lake City.

== Description ==
The station is located at 1131 East Pioneer Road (12400 South). The station was built in the historic center of Draper between 12300 South and 12400 South next to Draper's city hall, the Draper Poultrymen and Egg Producers' Plant (now operated as Intermountain Farmers Association [IFA]), and Draper City Park.

It is situated in an area where the railroad right-of-way on which the TRAX line is built turns east-southeast at the base of a retail-covered hill to the northeast; the right-of-way (proposed for the cancelled Phase 2 of the Draper Extension, and already incorporating a rails-with-trails multi-use path) continues east, then south and west in a curve following the contours of the land in order to gain elevation on its approach to the Point of the Mountain pass and enter Utah County. The Draper Branch of the Salt Lake County Library is located just south of the station (off 1130 East). Immediately south of the passenger platform (on the north side of East Pioneer Road) is an exhibit that includes an historic rail car and the history of Draper, particularly the history of egg production in the area.

The station has a park and ride lot to the north of the passenger platform which is accessible from East Draper Parkway (from 700 East, 1000 East, 1300 East, and I-15). Due to the slope of the hillside on which it is built, the Park and Ride lot is terraced, with the Draper Canal running between sections of the lot. The station was opened August 18, 2013 as part of the Blue Line's Draper extension and is operated by the Utah Transit Authority.

The Draper Town Center station is the terminus of Phase 1 of the Draper extension. The cancelled Phase 2 of the Draper extension would have seen two more stations further south along the railway right of way. The cancelled stations would have been along Highland Drive to 14600 South.
