= Van Hung =

Van Hung may refer to:

- MV Van Hung, a Vietnamese cargo ship
- Peter Nguyen Van Hung (born 1958), Vietnamese Australian Catholic priest and human rights activist
- Nguyễn Văn Hùng (martial artist) (born 1980), Vietnamese martial artist
- Nguyễn Văn Hùng (athlete) (born 1989), Vietnamese triple jumper
