= South Salt Lake, Utah =

City in Utah, United States

- City
- City of South Salt Lake
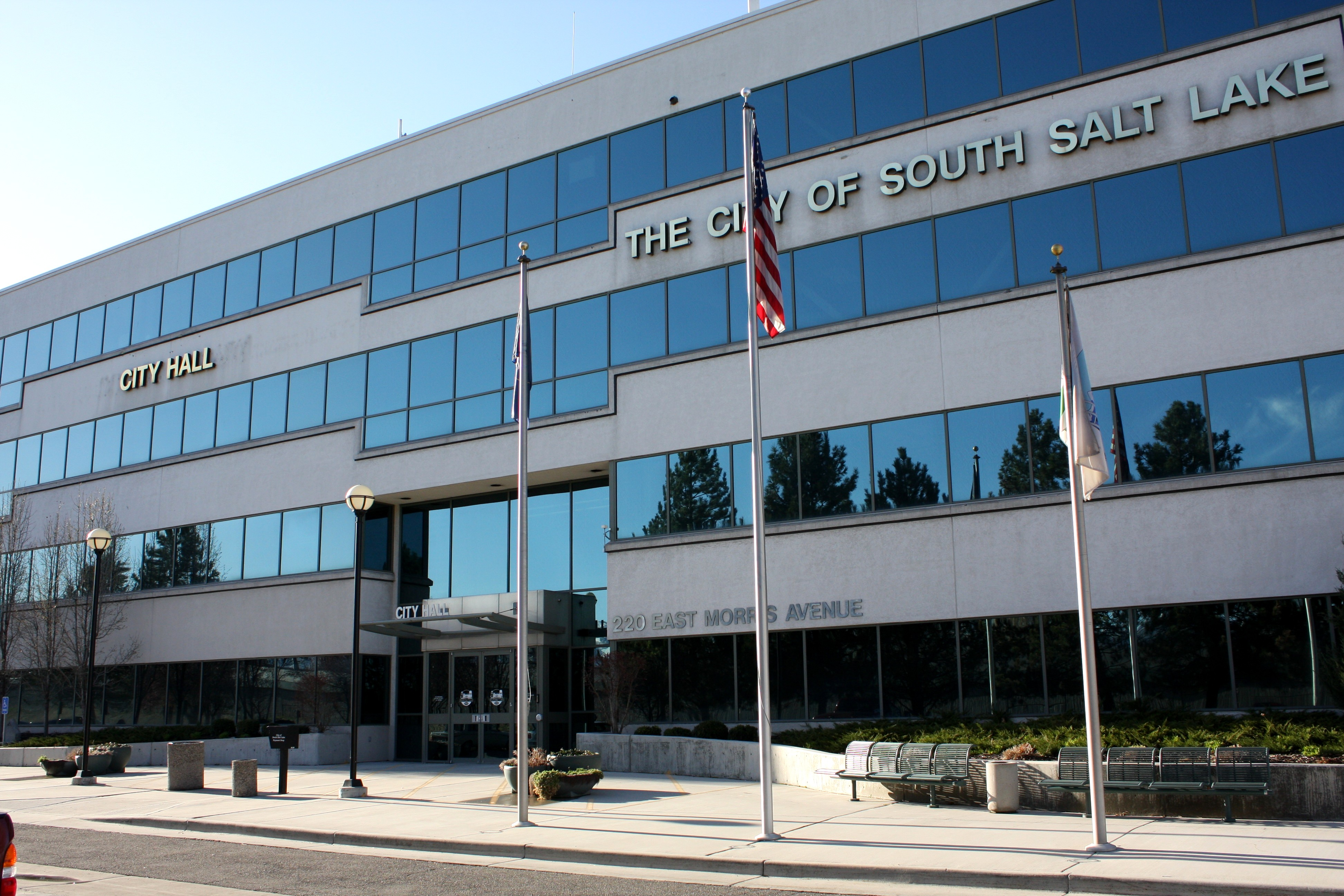
- South Salt Lake City Hall, South Salt Lake, Utah
- Motto: City on the Move
- Location in Salt Lake County and the state of Utah.
- Coordinates: 40°42′28″N 111°53′21″W
- Country: United States
- State: Utah
- County: Salt Lake
- Settled: 1847
- Incorporated: 1938
- Named for: Great Salt Lake

Area
  - Total: 6.94 sq mi (17.98 km^{2})
  - Land: 6.94 sq mi (17.98 km^{2})
  - Water: 0 sq mi (0.00 km^{2})
- Elevation: 4,255 ft (1,297 m)

Population (2020)
  - Total: 26,777
  - Density: 3,857/sq mi (1,489/km^{2})
- Time zone: UTC−7 (Mountain (MST))
  - Summer (DST): UTC−6 (MDT)
- ZIP codes: 84106, 84115, 84119
- Area codes: 385, 801
- FIPS code: 49-71070
- GNIS feature ID: 1432753
- Website: https://sslc.gov/

South Salt Lake is a city in Salt Lake County, Utah and a core inner suburb of Salt Lake City proper, and thus part of the Salt Lake City metropolitan area. The population was 26,777 at the 2020 census.

== History ==
Jesse Fox Jr. developed the area South Salt Lake referred to as Central Park around 1890. Mr. Fox chose the name after visiting New York and seeing Central Park there. He was impressed by the park and its design within an urban environment. Despite South Salt Lake being rural at the time, he decided to name the area Central Park. In 1925 the LDS Central Park Ward was created and named after the development.

In 1936, an attempted annexation by Salt Lake City failed due to concerns over funding and implementation of a sewer system. On August 14, 1936, a resolution creating the Town of Central Park was approved by the Board of County Commissioners - however, this did not last long, as voters then decided to disincorporate the town in 1937. In a close vote, voters then approved incorporation of South Salt Lake.

On September 29, 1938, still in need of a sewer system, South Salt Lake voted to incorporate as the Town of South Salt Lake, with Robert R. Fitts as the first town president. The town was also lacking many other basic amenities at the time that would be easier to implement with incorporation, such as a post office and fire department. In 1939, the Works Progress Administration finally began construction of a sewer system, with a cost of $462,000. The original boundary of South Salt Lake was from 500 East to 300 West and 2100 South to Mill Creek on the south.

On August 1, 1950, the population had increased enough for South Salt Lake to be designated as a third class city. This changed the form of government to a mayor and city council. The town president of the time, Marlow Callahan, became the first mayor of the City of South Salt Lake.

In the 1990s, South Salt Lake annexed portions of an unincorporated portion of Salt Lake County to the south, and nearly doubled in land area and population. On January 4, 2010, Cherie Wood became South Salt Lake's first female mayor.

== Geography ==
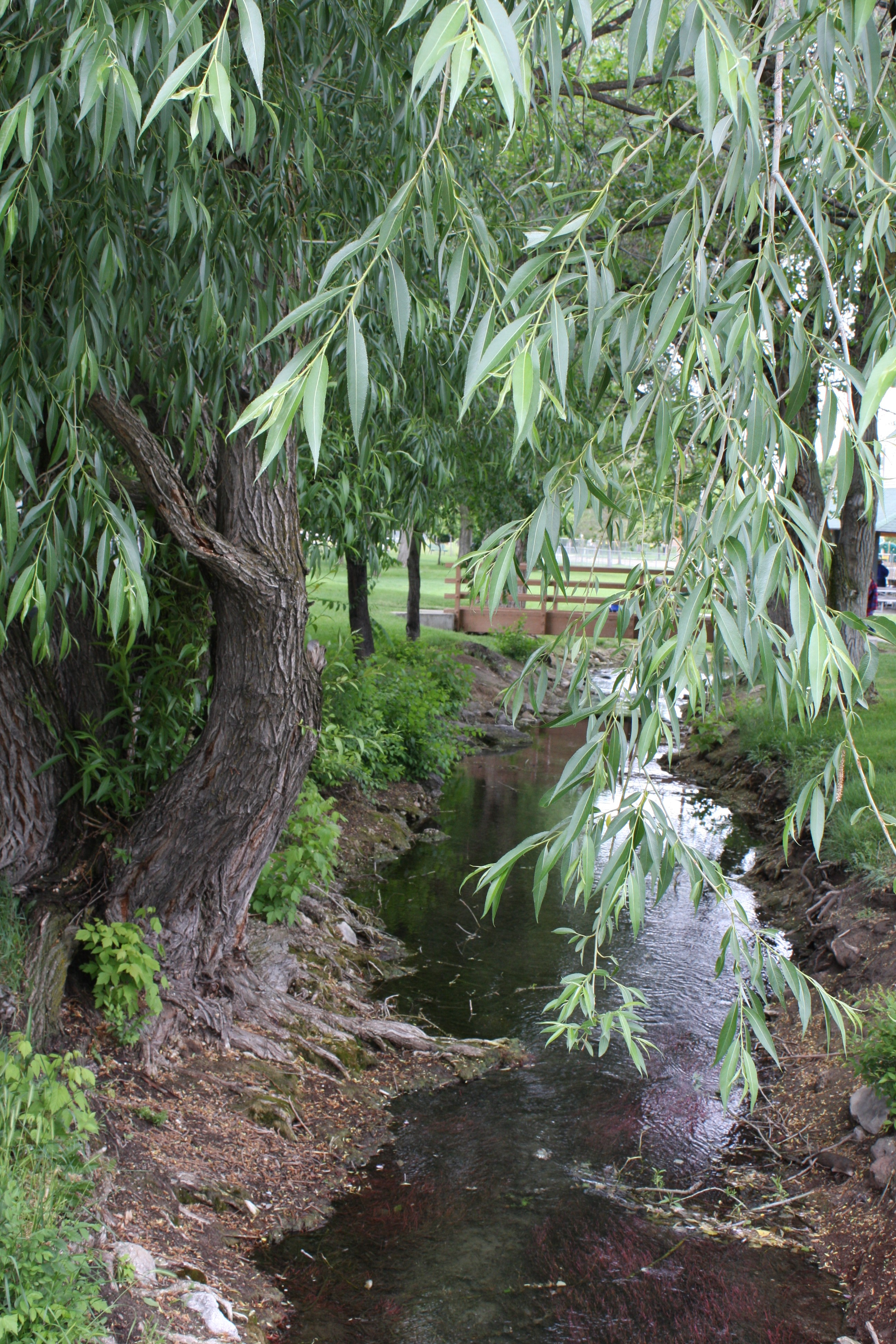
Bridge at Fitts Park in the City of South Salt Lake, UT

According to the United States Census Bureau, the city has a total area of 6.9 square miles (18 km^{2}), all land.

The city is bordered by the Jordan River on the west, 500 East and 700 East on the east, 2100 South on the north, and 3900 South on the south. West Valley City lies to the west, Salt Lake City to the north, northeast, and east; and Millcreek to the east, south, and southeast. Because of its location next to the Jordan River and well away from the mountains, it is mostly flat, only ranging in elevation from about 4,330 feet (1,320 m) to 4,380 feet (1,340 m). It has a fairly high water table, with some areas being somewhat swampy before development in the early 1900s. Much city water comes through wells from the aquifer beneath the city. Three tributaries of Mill Creek converge in Fitts Park.

== Demographics ==
Historical population
Census	Pop.	Note	%±
1940	1,599		—
1950	7,704		381.8%
1960	9,520		23.6%
1970	7,810		−18.0%
1980	10,413		33.3%
1990	10,129		−2.7%
2000	22,038		117.6%
2010	23,617		7.2%
2020	26,777		13.4%
U.S. Decennial Census

=== 2020 census ===
As of the 2020 census, South Salt Lake had a population of 26,777. The median age was 32.0 years. 18.9% of residents were under the age of 18 and 7.7% of residents were 65 years of age or older. For every 100 females there were 120.4 males, and for every 100 females age 18 and over there were 123.8 males age 18 and over.

100.0% of residents lived in urban areas, while 0.0% lived in rural areas.

There were 10,448 households in South Salt Lake, of which 25.8% had children under the age of 18 living in them. Of all households, 30.3% were married-couple households, 30.1% were households with a male householder and no spouse or partner present, and 28.8% were households with a female householder and no spouse or partner present. About 34.5% of all households were made up of individuals and 6.4% had someone living alone who was 65 years of age or older.

There were 11,410 housing units, of which 8.4% were vacant. The homeowner vacancy rate was 1.3% and the rental vacancy rate was 8.9%.

Racial composition as of the 2020 census
Race	Number	Percent
White	15,742	58.8%
Black or African American	1,681	6.3%
American Indian and Alaska Native	595	2.2%
Asian	2,279	8.5%
Native Hawaiian and Other Pacific Islander	440	1.6%
Some other race	3,089	11.5%
Two or more races	2,951	11.0%
Hispanic or Latino (of any race)	6,606	24.7%

=== 2010 census ===
As of the 2010 census, there were 23,617 people, 9,160 housing units, with a total of 8,554 households. The population density was 3,401.1 people per square mile (1,231.4/km^{2}) with a land area of 6.94 miles. The racial makeup of the city was 69.5% White, 4.4% African American, 2.6% Native American, 5.0% Asian, 1.0% Pacific Islander, and 4.1% from two or more races. Hispanic or Latino of any race was 29.1% of the population.

There were 8,554 households, out of which 26.9% had children under the age of 18 living with them, 33% were married couples living together, 14.1% had a female householder with no husband present, and 46.2% were non-family house holds. 34% of all households were made up of individuals, and 13.9% had someone living alone who was 65 years of age or older. The average household size was 2.46 and the average family size was 3.24.

In the city, the population was spread out, with 77.8% over the age of 18, 11.5% from 20 to 24, 12.5% from 25 to 29, 6.1% from 45 to 49, and 6.8% who were 65 years of age or older. The median age was 30.3 years. For every 100 females, there were 121.0 males. For every 100 females age 18 and over, there were 127.1 males.

The median income for a household in the city was $35,547 and the median income for a family was $37,632. Males had a median income of $27,432 versus $22,275 for females. The per capita income for the city was $15,786. According to US Census Bureau data, the number of persons below the poverty level in 2009-2013 was 29.7%, over twice the Utah average.

== Economy ==
- The world's first Kentucky Fried Chicken (now KFC) franchise was established in 1952 by Harland Sanders and Pete Harman in what is now part of South Salt Lake.
- In 2012, a Chinatown development opened on a lot in the city near 3500 South and State Street. It is the only Chinatown in the Intermountain West. In addition to having many Asian-themed restaurants, it has a large Asian-themed supermarket. According to the Deseret News, ground breaking on the new Chinatown occurred in 2011 for a Chinese-themed shopping mall with a "... 27,000 square foot Asian grocery store, 65,000 square foot indoor mall including 38 Asian-themed shops and 12,000 square feet Asian-themed strip mall". Margaret Yee, a 1962 graduate said that "... 10,000-plus Chinese nationals living in the area have wanted [a Chinatown] for a long time...." By late 2012, the Chinatown has experienced an upsurge of Chinese immigrants and the businesses are now filling up the Chinatown.
- In 2017, after nearly 7 years of planning, ground was broken on a new mixed-use development known as The Crossing (formerly called Market Station) between State St. and Main St. just south of 2100 South, intended to serve as South Salt Lake's "downtown". This development is oriented around mass transit, with an S-Line streetcar stop adjacent to the development, and 1 stop away from the Central Pointe TRAX Station. The first phase includes a WinCo Foods and a townhome development. Ultimately, this downtown development is planned to have 2,500 family housing units, 1.5 million square feet of retail, 3 million square feet of office and commercial space, and additional greenspace and trails.

== Crime ==
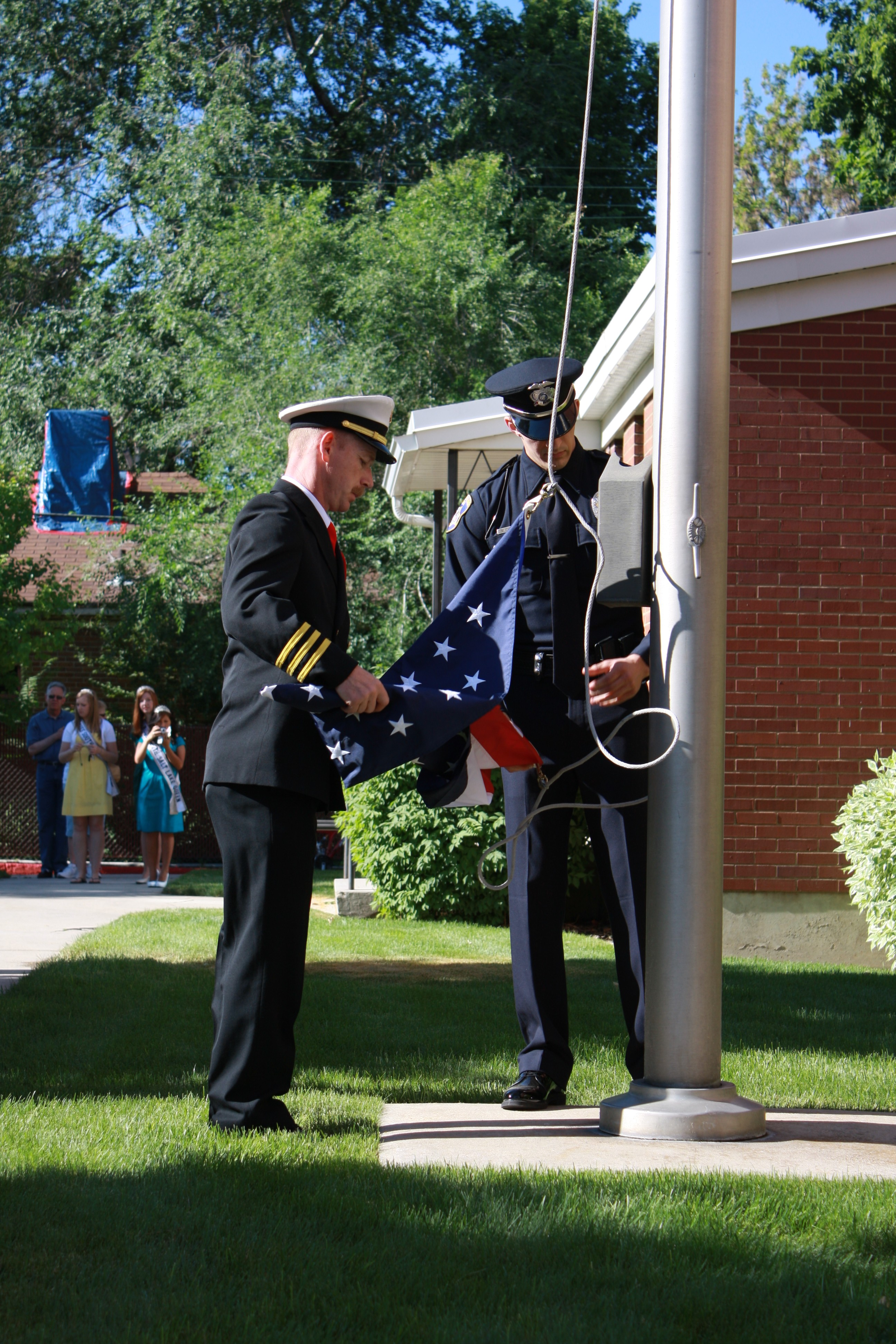
Public Safety Officers hoisting the flag on the 4th of July, South Salt Lake City, UT

Since 2007, crime in South Salt Lake has been reduced by 30%. Former SSL Police Chief Chris Snyder attributes the drop in crime to 4 factors: 1) Increased attention to code enforcement, 2) Crime Free Rental Housing program that results in greater landlord scrutiny of potential renters, 3) Partnerships, such as that with United Way of Salt Lake, combined with community organizing, such as the Promise South Salt Lake initiative, South Salt Lake Community Connection that address resident needs and improve neighborhoods, and 4) Extensive youth development efforts, such as Promise afterschool programs delivered in nine Neighborhood Centers across the city, and urban/neighborhood revitalization projects. There is a new emphasis on redevelopment (including the Market Station development) and a reduction in the number of liquor licenses allowed to be issued is anticipated to reduce crime in the city.

The Motovo Real Estate Blog ranked South Salt Lake as the "Most Dangerous Place in Utah" citing data from the 2012 FBI Uniform Crime Report. Their report found that South Salt Lake had the most violent crimes per capita in Utah, with the second highest non-violent crime rate as well.

== Transportation ==
I-15, I-80, and SR-201 intersect in the northwestern portion of the city. This interchange is known locally as the "Spaghetti Bowl" due to its complex array of on and off ramps, which extend to several other city roads in the area. US-89 runs north-to-south along State Street through the heart of South Salt Lake, serving as the primary commercial corridor and includes an interchange at I‑80. SR-171 (3300 South) traverses the city east-to-west, with an interchange at I‑15. SR-71 (South 700 East) runs along the southern part of the east border of the city and also has an interchange at I‑80.

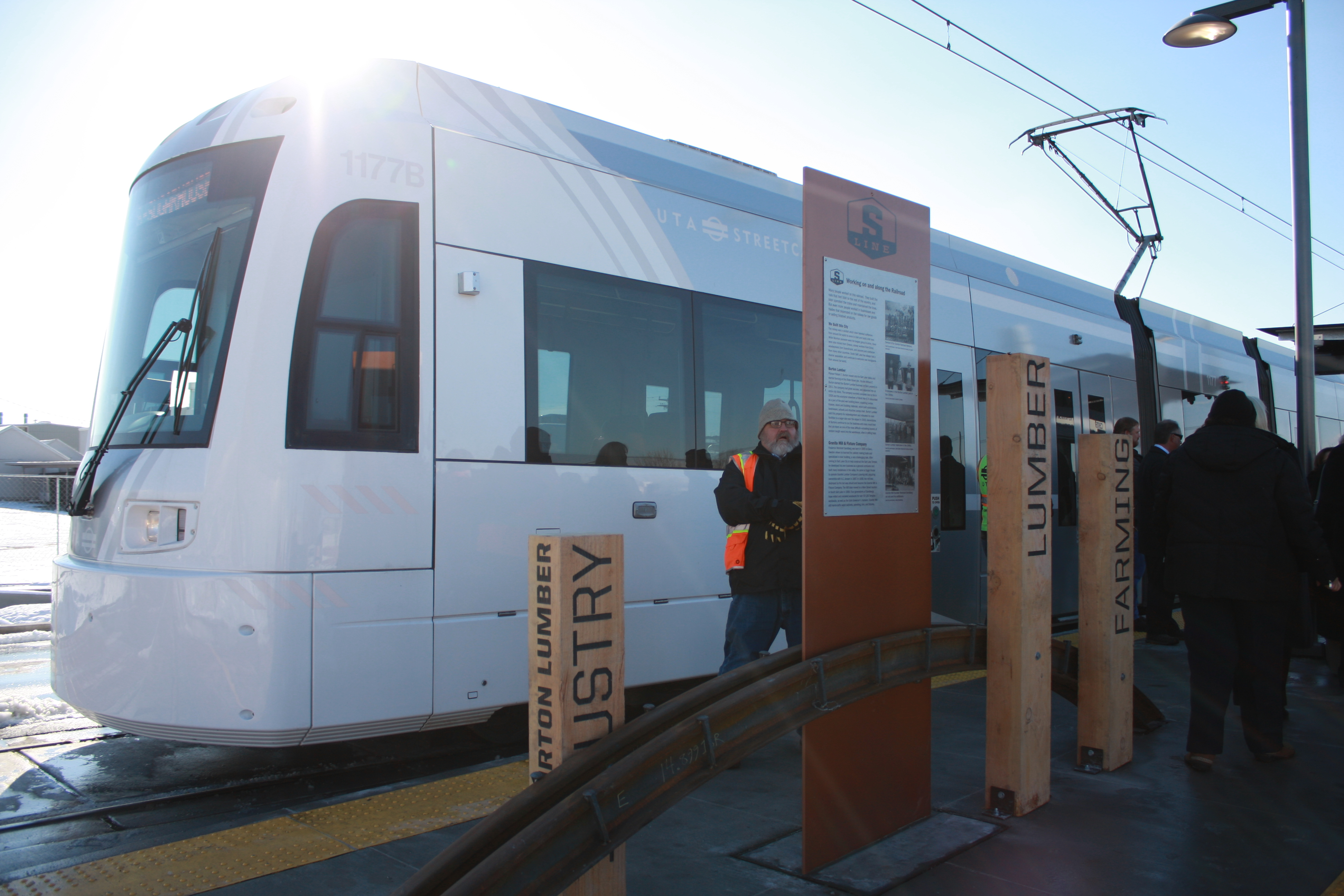
The S Line streetcar at the South Salt Lake City station, December 2013

Utah Transit Authority's (UTA) TRAX light rail runs through the city at about 200 West, with 3 stations located within the city limits. All three of the TRAX lines (Blue, Red, and Green) enter the city from the north at Central Pointe station. (The UTA Police Department was located at the Central Pointe station until it moved to its new location at Murray Central station in July 2016.) From Central Pointe station the Green Line heads west to West Valley City while both the Blue and Red lines continue south to stop at the Millcreek station before leaving the city just south of the Meadowbrook station. UTA also has several local bus routes that run through the city, many of which stop every fifteen minutes.

In December 2013, the S Line streetcar (formerly known as Sugar House Streetcar) opened for service. The S Line was built along an existing rail line just south of 2100 South (the northern border of the city) from the Central Pointe station to the Sugar House neighborhood in southeastern Salt Lake City. In addition to Central Pointe station, the S Line will include stops at South Main Street (South Salt Lake City station), South 300 East (300 East station), and South 500 East (500 East station) before leaving the city. Although operated by UTA, the S Line is a joint project between South Salt Lake, Salt Lake City, and UTA.

== Notable sites ==
One of South Salt Lake's most notable and historic buildings is the Columbus Center. Originally a school around the turn of the 20th century, it was later used as a daycare center beginning in the 1950s. After being condemned in the late 1980s, it was renovated and expanded to include a branch of the Salt Lake County Library System as well as an auditorium, senior center and several other facilities.

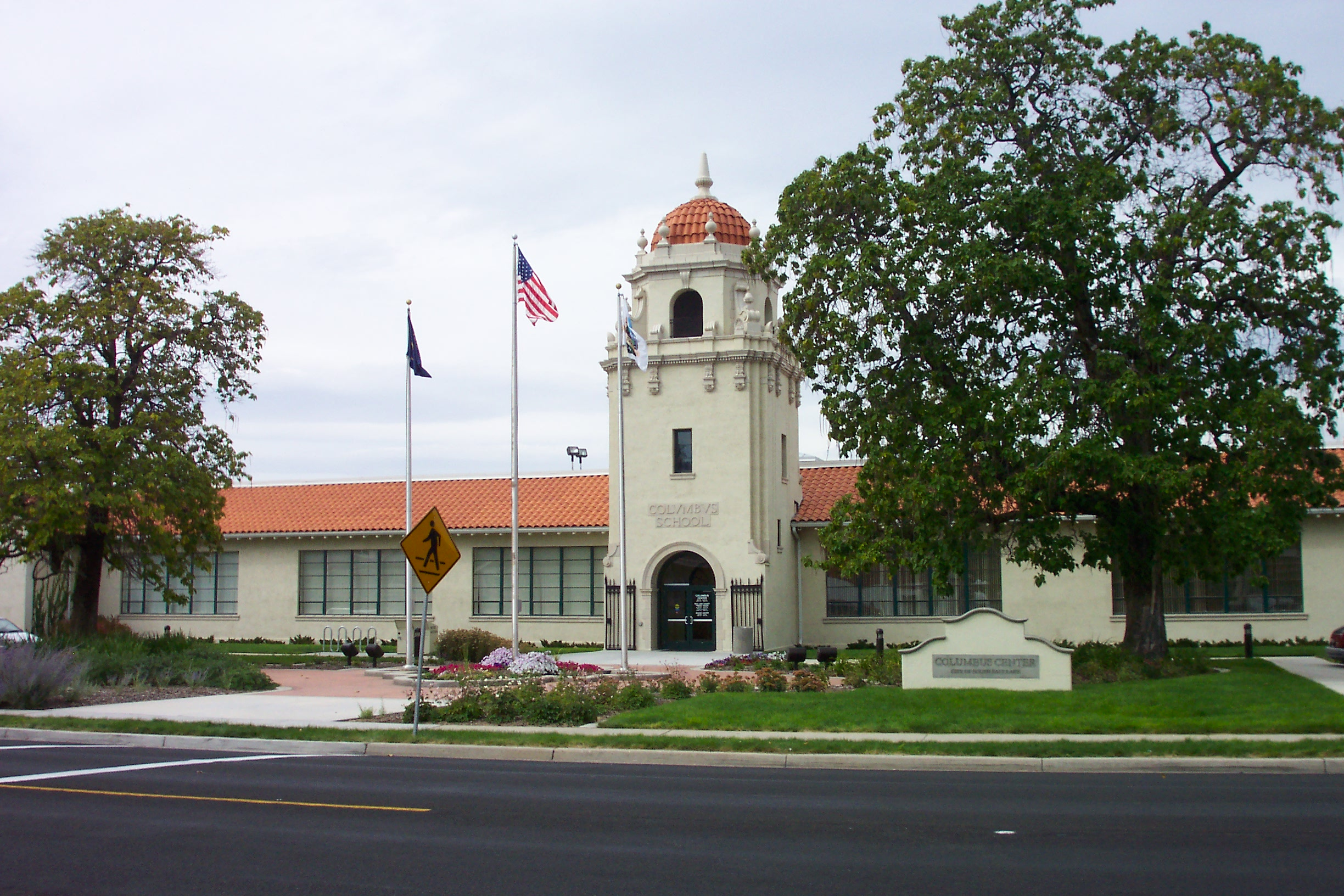
The Columbus Center in South Salt Lake City, UT

== Education ==
South Salt Lake lies within the Granite School District. The city is served by three public elementary schools (Lincoln, Woodrow Wilson, and Roosevelt) (PK–6), and one junior high school (Granite Park Junior High). With Mayor Wood's emphasis on education, two charter schools have located in South Salt Lake, Alianza (K–8) and the Utah International Charter School (7–12). The Salt Lake City campus of Broadview University is located next to the South Salt Lake city offices, and the city also has strong ties and partnerships with local institutions of higher education, Salt Lake Community College and Westminster University. Utah State University has a satellite campus located within the Granite District Offices at 2500 South State Street, also in South Salt Lake.

== See also ==
- List of cities and towns in Utah
