= Meadowbrook station =

Meadowbrook station may refer to:

- Meadowbrook station (SEPTA), a regional rail station in Abington, Pennsylvania
- Meadowbrook station (Utah Transit Authority), a light rail station in South Salt Lake, Utah
