= Ray Hopkins Senior Center =

Ray W. Hopkins Mauldin Senior Center
- Alternative names: Ray Hopkins Senior Center, Mauldin Senior Center
- Etymology: From a previous mayor of Mauldin named Ray W. Hopkins

General information
- Status: Active
- Type: Senior center
- Location: Mauldin, South Carolina, United States, 203 Corn Road, Mauldin SC 29662

Website
- cityofmauldin.org/recreation/seniorprograms

Ray W. Hopkins Mauldin Senior Center (often referred to as Ray Hopkins Senior Center or Mauldin Senior Center) is a senior center located in Mauldin, South Carolina, United States. Membership at the senior center is exclusively for individuals over the age of 54, but several organizations have used the campus for other purposes.

== History ==
The site of the senior center was once part of the Mauldin City Park. The size of the city park was reduced by half when the senior center was built and the park is now behind the senior center.

== Membership ==
People can only join the senior center if they are at least 55 years old. The senior center has a fitness room on the premises and holds scheduled exercise classes, for members. It also organizes occasional excursions for members.

== Alternative uses ==
Freedom Church, located in Greenville, holds services at the senior center every Sunday. These reservations were requested and gained in late 2015. There is also some history of Girl Scout recruitment activities at the senior center. On Election Day, the senior center is one of many polling places in Mauldin.

== Legal issues ==
Students of Mauldin High School, which is across the street from the senior center, illegally parking were parking in parking lots surrounding the high school because of the inconvenience of purchasing a parking pass from the school. Many of the students parking illegally were parking at the senior center parking lot. In September 2015, Mauldin's city council ratified a new parking decree which allowed police to more strictly enforce parking codes.
