= Vietnamese people in Taiwan =

Total population
- 259,088 (June 2023)

Regions with significant populations
- Taiwan

Languages
- Vietnamese; some Mandarin or Hokkien training provided to migrant workers

Religion
- Vietnamese folk religion, Mahayana Buddhism, Taoism, and Roman Catholicism

Related ethnic groups
- Overseas Vietnamese
- Lower population figure; Upper population figure (sum of separate estimates for migrant workers and foreign spouses); regions; languages;

Vietnamese people in Taiwan

Chinese name
- Chinese: 在台越南人
Transcriptions
Standard Mandarin
- Hanyu Pinyin: Zàitái Yuènánrén
- Wade–Giles: Tsai^{4}-t'ai^{2} Yüeh^{4}-nan^{2}-jen^{2}
Yue: Cantonese
- Jyutping: zoi^{6} toi^{4} jyut^{6} naam^{4} jan^{4}
Southern Min
- Hokkien POJ: chāi Tâi Oa̍t-lâm-lâng

Vietnamese name
- Vietnamese alphabet: Người Việt tại Ðài Loan

Vietnamese people in Taiwan form one of the island's larger communities of foreign residents. Of the roughly 80,000 Vietnamese workers who resided in Taiwan as of 2006, 60,000 are employed as domestic helpers, 16,000 work in factories, 2,000 in marine-based industries, and the remainder in other lines of work. They compose 21% of the island's foreign workers. 42% work in Taipei City, New Taipei City, and Taoyuan City. Additionally, 118,300 Vietnamese women who met Taiwanese men through illegal matchmaking services resided in Taiwan as of 2005. Taiwan, along with China and Cambodia, were rated "Tier 2" for their abuses against foreign laborers and illegal brides due to their lack of effort in combating human trafficking.

== History ==
South Vietnamese slaves were taken by the Dutch East India Company to Taiwan when it was under Dutch rule. The Dutch had Pampang and Quinamese slaves on their colony in Taiwan, and in 1643 offered rewards to aboriginal allies who would recapture the slaves for them when they ran away. 18 Quinamese and Java slaves were involved in a Dutch attack against the Tammalaccouw aboriginals, along with 110 Chinese and 225 troops under Governor Traudenius on January 11, 1642. 7 Quinnamese and 3 Javanese were involved in a gold hunting expedition along with 200 Chinese and 218 troops under Senior Merchant Cornelis Caesar from November 1645 to January 1646. "Quinam" was the Dutch name for the Vietnamese Nguyen Lord ruled Cochinchina (which used in the 17th century to refer to the area around Quang Nam in central Vietnam, (Annam) until in 1860 the French shifted the term Cochinchina to refer to the Mekong Delta in the far south, and Pampang was a place in Java which was ruled by the Dutch East India Company in the East Indies. The Dutch sided with the Trịnh lords of Tonkin (Northern Vietnam) against the Nguyen Lords of Quinam (Cochinchina) during the Trịnh–Nguyễn War and were therefore hostile to Quinam.

== Labour migration ==
Taiwan is one of the major destinations for Vietnamese labour migrants, especially in the manufacturing and fisheries industries. In 2002, Vietnamese workers in Taiwan composed 28.5% (13,200 individuals) of the 46,200 Vietnamese workers deployed overseas, making Taiwan the second most popular destination ahead of Laos and behind Malaysia; Taiwan maintained its importance as a destination even as migration to South Korea and Japan dropped off.

Since Taiwan's Council of Labor Affairs (now Ministry of Labor) granted approval for their employment beginning in 1999, Vietnamese domestic helpers began to compose a significant proportion of the Vietnamese women in Taiwan. Between 2000 and 2003, the number of Vietnamese domestic helpers grew by fifteen times, from 2,634 individuals to 40,397 individuals, making them the second-largest group of domestic helpers by nationality, ahead of Filipinas and behind Indonesians; they composed one-third of all foreign domestic helpers on the island. Filipinas had formerly been the largest nationality among the population of domestic helpers, as widespread English language education in their country made them ideal tutors for the children of employers. However, their excellent command of English also disturbed the expected power dynamic between them and their employers, who often spoke very poor English; Vietnamese and Indonesians came to be preferred precisely because of their lower level of English, which put them at a disadvantage relative to their employers, and also served as a barrier to restrict their access to networks of support and information outside of the employer's home.

By 2004, Vietnam was sending 37,700 labourers to Taiwan each year, the bulk of them as domestic helpers and hospital workers. However, in 2005, frustrated by the desertion rate of Vietnamese workers, which was the highest rate among labourers of all Asian nationalities in Taiwan, the CLA imposed a freeze on the hiring of Vietnamese labourers in order to have time to discuss the situation with Vietnam's Department for Authority of Foreign Employed Labour, the department responsible for Vietnamese workers abroad. By the following year, the two departments had renegotiated the standard labour contracts for Vietnamese workers, extending them from three to six years and cutting down on red tape, as well as adopting a formal grievance policy through which employees could seek redress against their employers; however, the deposit required of workers was also increased, in an effort to address the high rate of contract termination by employees.

== Matchmaking and marriages ==
International matchmaking services flourish in Vietnam despite their illegality; 118,300 Vietnamese women, largely from the south of Vietnam, were married to Taiwan men as of 2005. As early as 2001, Vietnamese women composed 49% of all foreign brides in Taiwan. Their average age was between 25 and 26 years old, while that of their grooms was 36; 54% came from Ho Chi Minh City. 73% were of Kinh ethnicity, the majority group in Vietnam, while the remaining 27% were of Chinese descent. 72,411 (60%) of all Vietnamese brides in Taiwan as of 2005 had married within the past ten years. Vietnamese women married to Taiwan men composed 85% of the 11,973 people who naturalised as Republic of China citizens in 2006. The Vietnamese government established a variety of regulations on international marriages between 2002 and 2005, including prohibiting some marriages where the age gap was too large, and also requiring marriage partners to have a common language of communication. The Republic of China government also seeks to limit the amount of spousal migration, but unlike the Vietnamese government, the only tool with which they can effectively control it is visa policy. Their implementation in this regard has changed over the years; they originally conducted individual interviews for spousal visas, changing to group interviews in 1999; in 2005, they imposed a limit of 20 visa interviews per day. By 2007, the number of new brides had fallen off from a peak of around 14,000 per year to just one-third that size.

According to statistics of the United Nations High Commissioner for Refugees, an estimated 3,000 Vietnamese women formerly married to Taiwan husbands have been left stateless after their divorces; the women had given up Vietnamese nationality to naturalise as Republic of China citizens at the time of their marriage, but then returned to Vietnam following their divorces and gave up their Republic of China nationality in the process of applying for restoration of Vietnamese nationality. Their children, who hold only Republic of China nationality and have never previously been Vietnamese nationals, are ineligible to enter publicly supported schools in Vietnam.

== Notable individuals ==
- Mạch Ngọc Trân
- Peter Nguyen Van Hung
- Tôn Thất An
- Nguyễn Kim Hồng
