= International marriage of Vietnamese women =

The history of international marriage of Vietnamese women was rooted during the colonial period and Vietnam War, where there were Vietnamese women who married Europeans and Americans. The issue is controversial. Some of them have married Viet Kieu men in the west and faced the problem of diaspora marriage, but nevertheless were people who were not culturally nor racially distant, whilst some have married people from other backgrounds, which is far more controversial. The largest amount of international marriage of Vietnamese women attracted attention in the respect of the reasons for international marriage, the living conditions in destination countries and the images of these Vietnamese brides. In almost all cases, the "Vietnamese mail-order bride" is an illegal and unethical business that is a violation of human rights. Human and sex trafficking are related criminal offenses. International marriage has often been viewed as taboo since its perception of linkages with colonialism, exploitation, and differences in cultural and racial background. Although such marriages may be seen as breaking down racial and cultural barriers, the children of such marriages, especially if they are from very divergent cultural backgrounds, will fit into none of their parent societies, only being called the derogatory "halfie" or "người Lai" (倘騾 in Hán-Nôm Vietnamese, meaning mule or crossbreed) and may be seen as less than human or not normal due to their diverse and multicultural background. There is also a sense of pervasive and unwelcome gender imbalance where Vietnamese women were more likely to marry out (causing them to be called leftovers, undesirable women, or "not normal") then Vietnamese men (who were expected to conform to tradition). Gender equality is a difficult subject to discuss but nevertheless is a area of concern.

The target audience were mostly young girls in rural areas with poor education, difficult economic circumstances, or no stable jobs, are gullible and lacking in understanding. Precise ethnicity is uncertain or was not measured.

== Overview ==
All the 63 provinces of Vietnam have the cases of international marriage between Vietnamese citizens (both male and female) and foreigner nationals.

Table 1: Number of Vietnamese people who married with foreign nationals over years by sex

Year	Total	Male	Female	Percentage of females
2008	21,805	1624	20181	92.6
2009	19,795	1527	18268	92.3
2010	20,802	1520	19282	92.7
2011	18,420	1730	16690	90.6
2012	17,891	1550	16341	91.3
2013	18,636	2318	16318	87.6
2014	17,746	2572	15174	85.5
2015	18,726	2733	15993	85.4

Note: Figures for 2008-2012 do not include date from Nghe An

Source: Department of Civil Status, Nationality and Authentication, Ministry of Justice, 2015 and 2016

Table 2: Number of Vietnamese female who married with foreign nationals over years by the concerned countries/territories

Year	Total	China (includes Taiwan)	Korea	USA	Others
2008	20181	4277	7655	4472	3777
2009	18268	3458	6623	4569	3618
2010	19282	3396	8425	4198	3263
2011	16690	3229	6957	3925	2579
2012	16341	2849	6343	4136	3013
2013	16318	3205	6066	5105	1942
2014	15174	3547	4374	4786	4409
2015	15993	4395	4158	5119	2321

Note: Other countries/territories include Cambodia, Europe, Malaysia, Australia, Canada and other country/territory

Source: Department of Civil Status, Nationality and Authentication, Ministry of Justice, 2015 and 2016

According to Table 1, most of these Vietnamese citizens who involved in international marriage are Vietnamese women. Meanwhile, Table 2 shows that most of Vietnamese brides marry males from Korea, China and USA.

As for the basic information about Vietnamese women involved in international marriage, there are some commonalities of Vietnamese brides in the respect of educational level, age of entering marriage and original residences in Vietnam.

In most cases, the educational level of Vietnamese brides who marry Korean and Taiwanese men is less than high school level. The educational level of Vietnamese women in foreign countries is relatively lower than local women and women from other countries. For example, the educational level of Filipino women and Chinese women who marry Korean men is higher than Vietnamese women.

The average ages of entering international marriage of Vietnamese women are quite stable over time. According to the data collected in 2004, about 70 percent of Vietnamese women marry at the age between 18 and 22, while their husbands marry them predominantly at the average age of 29. Moreover, according to the data collected in 2013, the age gap between Vietnamese brides and their husbands was eight to nine years, and the average marry ages of their husbands were still 29, which means the ages of entering marriage of Vietnamese brides did not change at all.

The trends of marry foreign Asian men initially began in mid-1990s in south where most women married overseas Vietnamese and then spread to the north after 2000s. There are two provinces: Can Tho and Hai Phong, which are believed to be the most important original residences of Vietnamese women who migrated to Taiwan and South Korea.

== History ==
Vietnamese women and girls were mass trafficked from Vietnam to China during French colonial rule by Chinese and Vietnamese pirates and agencies. French Captain Louis de Grandmaison claimed that these Vietnamese women did not want to go back to Vietnam and they had families in China and were better off in China. Vietnamese women were in demand because of a lower number of Chinese women available in China and along the borderlands of China there were many Chinese men who had no women and needed Vietnamese women. Vietnamese women in the Red River delta were taken to China by Chinese recruitment agencies as well as Vietnamese women who were kidnapped from villages which were raided by Vietnamese and Chinese pirates. The Vietnamese women became wives, prostitutes, or slaves.

Vietnamese women were viewed in China as "inured to hardship, resigned to their fate, and in addition of very gentle character" so they were wanted as concubines and servants in China and the massive traffick of Tongkinese (North Vietnamese) women to China started in 1875. There was massive demand for Vietnamese women in China. Southern Chinese ports were the destination of the children and women who were kidnapped by Chinese pirates from the area around Haiphong in Vietnam. Children and pretty women were taken by the pirates in their raids on Vietnamese villages. A major center for human trafficking of the slaves was Hai Phong. The Vietnamese children and women were kidnapped and brought to China to become slaves by both Chinese and Vietnamese pirates.

Muong, Hmong, Thái, and Nùng minority women in Tonkin's mountains were kidnapped by Vietnamese pirates and Chinese pirates to bring to China. The anti-French Can Vuong rebels were the source of the Vietnamese bandits while former Taiping rebels were the source of the Chinese rebels. These Vietnamese and Chinese pirates fought against the French colonial military and ambushed French troops, receiving help from regular Chinese soldiers to fight against the French. Chinese and Nùng pirates fought against Hmong. The Thái hated the Viet Minh and fought against them in 1947. Nung were said to be fit for banditry and piracy.

Brothels in Bangkok bought kidnapped Vietnamese women fleeing South Vietnam after the Vietnam war who were taken by pirates.

== Reasons for international marriages ==
The reasons of involving in international marriage are complex, some people view Vietnamese brides as objects without mentioning their agency; thus, they view the reasons of international marriage of Vietnamese women mainly from the perspective of external factors. However, some people find that it is necessary to focus on the agency of Vietnamese women, which means focusing on the internal factors which drive the decision of getting married with foreign men.

=== External reasons ===
The external reasons for international marriage comes both from sending communities and migrants’ destinations. Furthermore, the external reasons mainly based on economic and social factors.

==== Economic considerations ====
In the sending communities of Vietnamese brides, the external reason always associated with the economic disadvantages of Vietnamese brides’ original families. In the cases which Vietnamese brides are lack of the language skill of communicating with their foreign husbands, these Vietnamese women are often asked to marry foreign men by their parents due to the economic difficulties in their original families. Moreover, most of these Vietnamese brides will send remittance to their parents in Vietnam to support their original families.

In migrants’ destinations, economic consideration also leads to the shortage of local women who are willing to marry local men. For example, the local women in rural areas in Korea are not willing to marry local men, because they have to carry the family burden both from their own families and their husbands’ families after marriage. Most of these local women tend to marry men in urban area where they can find jobs rather than farming. Thus, the willingness to ‘marry up’ (note: ‘marry up’ means people marry partners whose living conditions is better than themselves; for example, women from rural areas choose to marry men in urban areas who have better occupations than men in rural areas.) leads to the imbalance of marriage market in rural areas in migrants’ destinations, which causes the international marriage between local men and Vietnamese women.

==== Marriage squeeze ====
Marriage squeeze happens both in sending communities and migrants’ destinations, but the marriage squeeze which leads to the rising of international marriage of Vietnamese women mainly happens in migrants’ destinations. The marriage squeeze is a prominent phenomenon in Chinese rural areas. The main characteristic of marriage squeeze is the imbalanced sex ratio. Caused by the preference to sons in Chinese rural areas, the sex ratio in the rural areas in Guangxi province is 114.02 and 109.45 (100 = female) based on the statistics in 2000 and 2010. Other than the imbalanced sex ratio, many local Chinese women choose to marry men from other parts in China. More and more women from rural areas in the west part of China come to the developed eastern part of China to find jobs and get married. This factor also leads to the deficit of women in rural areas and the severe marriage squeeze in border areas. The situation of marriage squeeze in China leads to the rising of finding wives from adjacent countries.

=== Internal reasons ===
==== Seeking a better life in migrants’ destinations ====
Following with the trends of globalization and the opening of Vietnamese to global market, Vietnamese, especially those who live in border areas increasingly involved in border trade with China. The prosperity of border trades attracts some Vietnamese women to seek for the opportunities to earn a better life. The most convenient way of being legally involved in border trades is marrying Chinese men in border areas. In some research, the business success of these Vietnamese women in China is proved. For example, Vietnamese brides in Chinese border areas often engaged in the occupations such as being factory workers, running exotic restaurants and organizing transnational transportation. In fact, Vietnamese women comprehensively participate in the local life of these borderlands. According to the survey about the satisfaction of Vietnamese women's international marriage, the results show that 83.6% of them are happy with their marriage mainly because the improvement of material conditions of their lives. However, since most Vietnamese Kinh don't live near the border areas, it is questionable about what the ethnicity of these women are - which may be minority ethnic groups who straddle between many countries like the Hmong.

==== Improvement in familial status ====
In the original families of Vietnamese brides, their status is often lower than their brothers due to the preference of sons in Vietnam. These Vietnamese brides choose to marry foreign men because they can earn more money than staying in their hometowns, after earning money they will send remittances back to their parents to show that they can also support the families like sons do. The sending of remittances not only maintain the link between Vietnamese brides and their original families, but also change their status in the original families. For these Vietnamese women, sending remittances does not only means being a responsible daughter but also being a semi-parent in birth family. In fact, marrying foreign men are always associated with earning more money in migrants’ destinations, which shows the agency of Vietnamese brides to be more supportive in their birth families. Instead of being viewed as the brides who are pushed by their parents to marry foreign men, some of them choose to marry internationally to support their birth families based on their own willing. By supporting their birth families, these Vietnamese brides also have the intentions about improving their status in birth families.

However, because of this Vietnamese feminist agenda, it is clear that Vietnamese women believe marrying foreign men might improve their social status, when in reality, they are diminished. The novelty of the foreign is temporary and divorce rates are extremely high between international marriages.

==== Romantic love ====
Apart from the internal reasons mentioned above, the factor of love is also important in some cases. According to the survey in Sino-Vietnam border areas, some Sino-Vietnam spouses know each other at a very young age because they live close to each other since childhood. These spouses get married after grown up, they can communicate smoothly with each other, and they usually have the same background with each other. In other cases, due to globalization, more and more Vietnamese women become migrant labors in other countries and marry local men based on the love between them. There are some Vietnamese meet with their foreign husbands in Vietnam and emigrate to their husbands’ countries after getting married. This may be the only reasonable and accepted form.

== Agents and networks ==
=== Intermediary agents ===
The intermediary agents from Vietnam and migrants’ destinations rises following with the trends of international marriage between Vietnamese women and foreign men. The intermediary agents in Vietnam are illegal agents who are involved in deception and human trafficking. (See also this video about how Vietnamese women were deceived and trafficked to China.) There were cases about Vietnamese agents being caught by police when holding the meeting between Vietnamese women and foreign men. To adapt to the matchmaking market in South Korea, some Korean agents also involved in sending Vietnamese women to South Korea.

=== Social networks among Vietnamese ===
Social networks in Vietnam also help Vietnamese women marry foreign men. In the cases of Vietnamese women marry overseas Vietnamese men, social network in Vietnam plays the most important role in the process of international marriage. Overseas Vietnamese men often ask their relatives in Vietnamese to find proper women for them. Social network also influence the international marriage in border areas where Vietnamese have close connections with Chinese. In other cases, Vietnamese women who marry foreign men also introduce their relatives in Vietnam to marry foreign men.

== Living conditions of Vietnamese brides ==
The living conditions of Vietnamese women in their migration destination are too complex to give a thorough introduction. To measure the living conditions of Vietnamese brides, it is important to measure to what extend they involved social life and household. (See also the video from Channel NewsAsia about Vietnamese women's living conditions and the impacts of their international marriage.)

=== Social life and involvement ===
In some cases, Vietnamese women are trafficked or deceived to marry Chinese men. These cases always happen in the rural border area between China and north Vietnam. In these cases, Vietnamese women faced the situation of de facto marriage which means their marriage rights cannot be protected by the law of China. The living conditions of these Vietnamese women are often negative, they are under the control of their husbands. Thus, their involvement in social life is slight, even their human rights are abused under some circumstances.

In other cases which Vietnamese women have their agency to marry foreign men, the living conditions are different. These Vietnamese women can find their own jobs though sometimes the wage is low. Moreover, language is an obstacle for Vietnamese brides in the process of adapting to new society. According to the survey in Taiwan and South Korea, some Vietnamese women indicates that they often face the difficulty of language, and their husbands do not allow them to attend language class. Due to the difficulty of language and the lack of education, some Vietnamese women face problems after becoming mothers.

In recent research result which focuses on Vietnamese brides in China, the living conditions of them are different. In the border area between China and Vietnam, more and more Vietnamese wives actively participate in local economic life by running restaurants with their husbands. However, the restaurants always registered under the name of their husbands while the real manager are Vietnamese women.

=== Women's status within the household ===
Generally, the status of Vietnamese women in traditional households is to be subordinate to their husbands. This is because the traditions in East Asian communities, the concept about how women should be obedient to their husbands is prevalent in rural areas where most Vietnamese women reside with their foreign husbands in Korea and mainland China. Thus, Vietnamese women are usually considered to be housewives who support their husbands by doing housework and raising children. Decisions are typically made by the husbands.

== The images of Vietnamese brides ==
=== In Vietnam ===
The images of Vietnamese brides are portrayed both by Vietnamese mainstream media and local people. The images of Vietnamese brides are constructed differently by different subjects.

==== Mainstream media in Vietnam ====
To summarize the images of Vietnamese brides constructed by mainstream media, the results are always associated with ‘innocent, trafficked, deceived and traitorous’. The dilemma faced by Vietnam society and Vietnamese single men caused this kind of perceptions. Though most of Vietnamese brides send their remittance back to their original families in sending villages, local parents still face the problem of their sons who cannot marry on time because most village girls marry abroad. The dilemma of single men's marriage caused by international marriage leads to the broad complaint across the country, which influences the way how Vietnamese mainstream media write the reports about international marriage and the way how they ‘label’ Vietnamese brides.

==== Local people in sending communities ====
Among local people in sending communities, especially those who have daughters married internationally. The images of Vietnamese brides are ‘responsible, reliable and supportive’. Owing to the large amount of remittance sent by Vietnamese brides, the household of their birth families improved prominently. According to the survey conducted in 2010, the living standard of the birth families of Vietnamese brides changed a lot after the migration of their daughters. For example, the proportion of poor families has fallen three times compared with the situation before migration. The proportion of upper-middle income families increases ten times from the situation before migration. The activities of Vietnamese brides in supporting their birth families help them gain the positive perceptions from their parents and local people.

=== In migrants' destinations ===
In migrants’ destinations, the images of Vietnamese brides have changed over time. For example, initially, the perceptions of Vietnamese female from Chinese male are mainly stereotypes caused from the occupations, tourism propaganda and status in family of Vietnamese women. The images of Vietnamese brides in migrant country are negatively portrayed by officials and natives due to the exaggeration of problematic issues and unchanged stereotypes.

The Vietnamese brides, however, have different perspectives. Based on the sociological fieldwork conducted by Huang in Sino-Vietnam borderland during 2011 to 2012, Vietnamese women successfully engaging in household and formal occupations. Due to their ability of making money and maintaining household, they gain mostly positive comments and perceptions from their husbands and local employers. The economic ability of Vietnamese women not only make them easily dispose family affairs in their new families, but also allow them to give remittance to their original families which then prove to their parents and the traditions of preferring boys to girls in Vietnam that daughters can do better than sons. All these positive factors show how Vietnamese women marry abroad to earn money for their parents and pursue their happiness. In contrary to what has been demonstrated in the previous research, Huang's research proves that Vietnamese women should not be solely taken as victims and ignorant girls in their international marriage. At least in China, the previous situations have changed a lot due their broadly participation in economic life.

However, though most of Vietnamese brides send their remittance back to their original families in sending villages, local parents still face the problem of their sons who cannot marry on time because of the girls marrying abroad. The dilemma of single men's marriage caused by international marriage leads to the broad anger across the country. Whilst they may be viewed positively overseas, Vietnamese reactions are wholly negative of these sorts of relationships.

== See also ==
- Asian migrant brides in Japan
- Human trafficking in Vietnam
- Vietnamese migrant brides in China
- Vietnamese migrant brides in Taiwan
