= Columbus Center =

Coordinates: 40°42′56″N 111°52′39″W

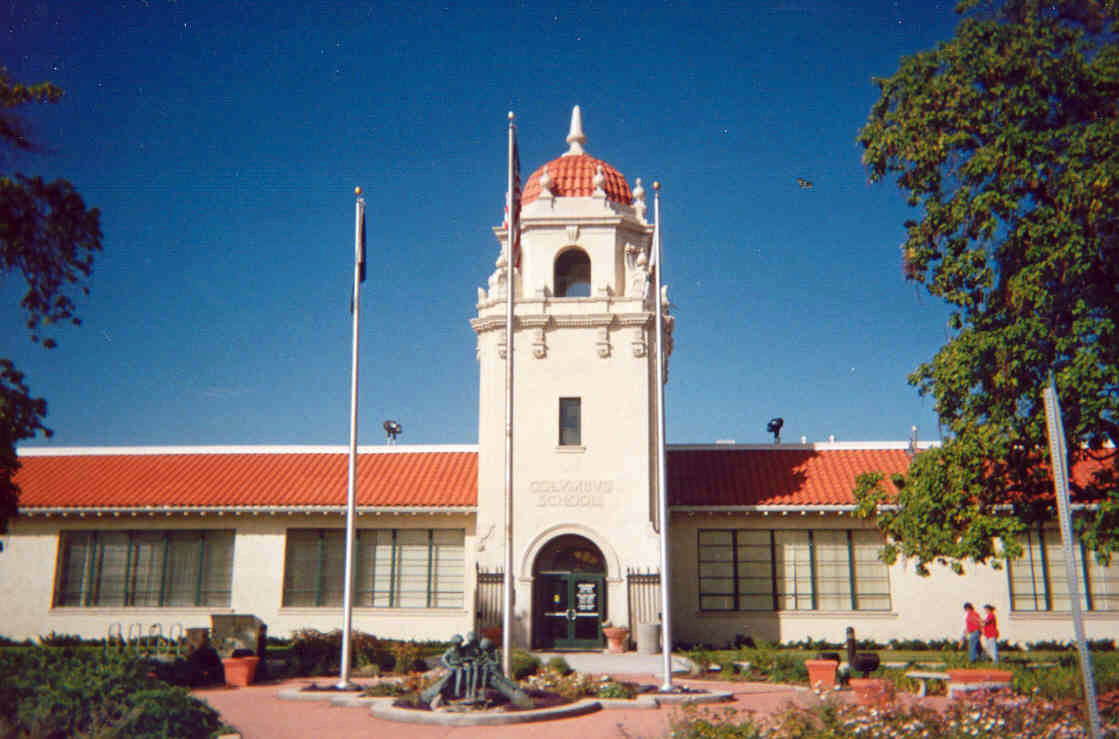
Columbus Center, South Salt Lake City, Utah

The Columbus School Building (also called the Columbus Center) is a structure in South Salt Lake, United States. It opened to the public in 1917, initially as a school and later as a library, but as of 2025 serving as a local landmark and community center for various welfare, sports and education programs.

The grounds around the building resemble a plaza or garden area and are landscaped with pathways, benches, statues, and various plants and trees.

== History ==
Architectural plans for the building were submitted in June 1916. The street address is 2531 South 400 East. It took less than a year to complete at a cost of $77,100.00, it opened mid-year 1917 as a primary school and closed as a school on June 4, 1968. Shortly after it was converted to house a training center for learning disabled adults, and used for that purpose for about 20 years. In 1974, President Gerald Ford visited the school.

In the late 1980s it was decided updating the building to meet earthquake codes and address asbestos remediation would be too costly, so the building was used as a warehouse until 1995. The property was sold to the City of South Salt Lake, and in 1997 the architectural firm Cooper Roberts was hired to do a complete renovation of the building. Four years and $5 million later a ribbon-cutting ceremony was held on April 22, 2002 to honor the opening of the Columbus Library.

== Amenities ==
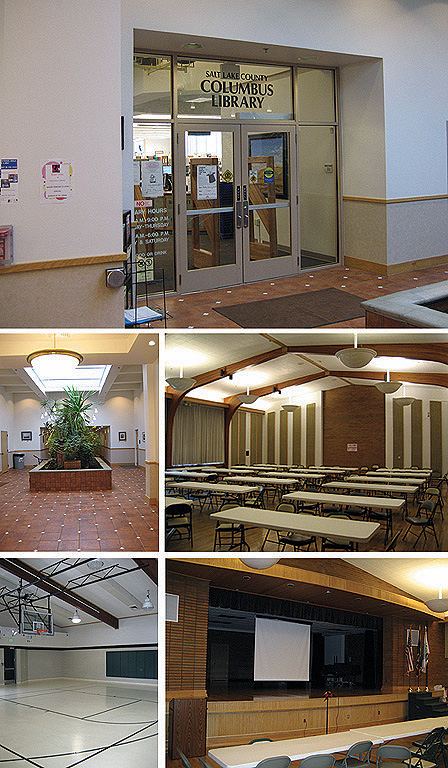
Columbus Center interior snapshots showing the front entrance and library entrance, the auditorium, and the gymnasium

Within the Columbus School building is a number of community services. The Columbus Library branch of Salt Lake County Library Services was a main attraction until it closed in late 2020. Additionally there are class/meeting rooms to accommodate up to 90 people, and an auditorium that will accommodate up to 350 people. A gymnasium/basketball court, a senior center, and a kitchen. The auditorium, gym, classrooms, and kitchen can all be rented for special occasions and gatherings.

Several organizations offer many classes at the Columbus Center, either for seniors, adults, or children. Classes include; Spanish Language, Hula Dance, Hawaiian Language, Judo, various types of Karate, Jazzercise, yoga and guitar lessons. Salsa, Swing, Ballroom, Latin, and many other dance styles are taught. By calling the Center, the public can find out about specific offerings and to get information about how to sign up. As they change and rearrange the offerings regularly. The Library also plans and sponsors numerous events and activities throughout the year. Such as art exhibits, book sales, story-time readings for kids, and other book clubs for seniors and adults, and more.

Open play basketball and billiards is available to children in 3rd through 12th grades. The schedule for open play changes throughout the year, and visitors are advised to confirm times before attending. Parents or legal guardians must fill out liability waivers for their children to participate. Open play is free.

== Additional images ==
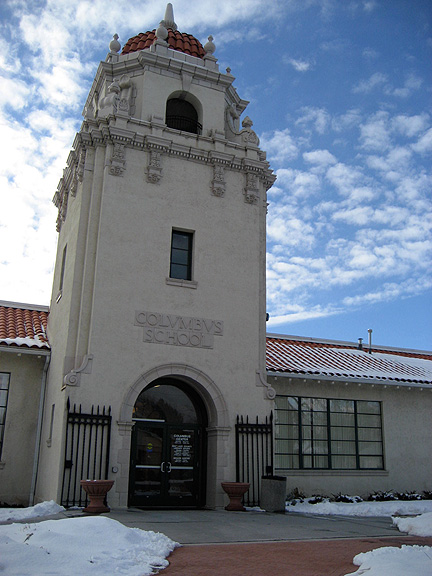
Columbus Center front entrance

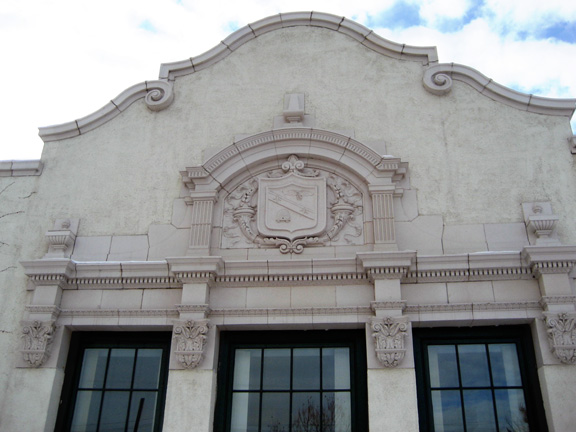
Columbus Center facade detail

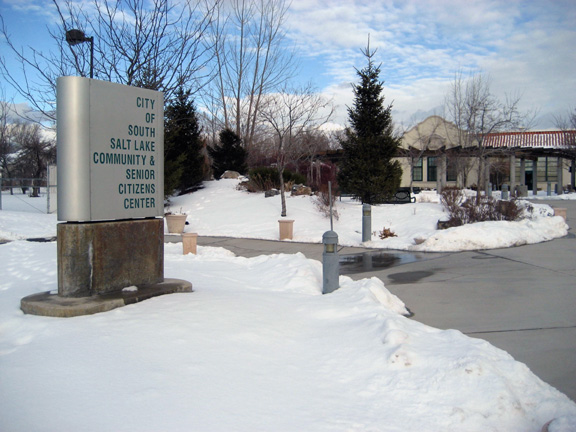
Columbus Center rear entrance
