= Nguyễn Kim Hồng =

Vietnamese-Taiwanese documentary film director

Nguyễn Kim Hồng (chữ Hán and Chinese: 阮金紅; pinyin: Ruǎn Jīnhóng; born May 15, 1980) is a Vietnamese-origin Taiwanese documentary film director.

== Life and career ==
Nguyễn Kim Hồng grew up in rural Đồng Tháp province in Vietnam with nine siblings and had to drop out of school after fifth grade to help her family of agricultural workers. Frustrated by her family's treatment, Kim Hồng decided to marry a Taiwanese man and moved to Taiwan in 2000 at the age of 21, but her husband abused her, accrued debts from gambling and her in-laws never accepted her, so she divorced him in 2008. As a single mother with custody of their daughter, she faced poverty and even thought of suicide, but took self-help courses to recover and volunteered at a local immigrant organization. That year, she met Tsai Tsung-lung (Chinese: 蔡崇隆; pinyin: Cài Chónglóng), a fellow documentary film maker and divorcee, at a film seminar. She appreciated the help he gave as an acquaintance, and they ended up courting and marrying the next year. They frequently collaborate on each others' films.

Out/Marriage, her first film, was released in 2012. The film covers the story of Kim Hồng and four other women (three from Vietnam and one from Indonesia) who migrated to Taiwan for marriage and the struggles they face in their new homes and communities, ultimately ending in disappointment and the end of their marriages. It was nominated for Best Documentary at the Taipei Film Festival. For the film, Kim Hồng successfully applied for a Wanderer grant from the Cloud Gate Dance Theater, the first such grant given to a "new immigrant".

Her second film, a short video titled Lonely Strangers (2013), covered the lives and struggles of four migrant Vietnamese workers in Taiwan who had left their sponsoring employers due to harsh conditions and mounting debt from agent fees. The film covers their hiding in the mountains as they illegally work other jobs, and the deportation of one of the workers after he is caught by police. According to Tsai, both Kim Hồng and the migrant workers were apprehensive about each other, but slowly built up trust during filming due to their shared background and promises of anonymity for the workers. A sequel, feature-length film, See You, Lovely Strangers, won the award for Best Documentary at the 2016 Golden Harvest Awards for Outstanding Short Films. However, she faced a lot of stress and gossip due to the subject matter and the deportation of some of the migrant workers, and Kim Hồng took a year-long break from filmmaking. Additionally, See You, Lovely Strangers has not been publicly screened outside schools and film festivals to preserve the workers' privacy and trust. She curated a film festival in Yunlin for migrant workers along with her husband in 2015. As of 2016, she hosted Public Television Service's Far and Away (我在台灣 你好嗎; lit. 'I'm in Taiwan, how are you?') television series about immigrants in Taiwan and designed a curriculum to teach heritage languages to the children of Southeast Asian immigrants in Taiwanese schools.

In 2020, Kim Hồng produced the documentary And Miles to Go Before I Sleep (九槍; lit. 'Nine Shots'), directed by Tsai, which covered the shooting and killing of Nguyễn Quốc Phi, an undocumented Vietnamese migrant worker, by a police officer in 2017. At the 59th Golden Horse Awards in 2022, the film won the Golden Horse Award for Best Documentary Feature; Kim Hồng delivered a speech prepared by Quốc Phi's family that conveyed their "grief and hopes".

In March 2026, Kim Hồng was nominated to the board of directors of the Public Television Service.

== Filmography ==
- Out/Marriage (Chinese: 失婚記, Vietnamese: Ly hôn ký sự, lit. 'Divorce Chronicle') - 2012
- Lovely Strangers (可愛陌生人, Người dưng thân thương) - 2013 short
- See You, Lovely Strangers (再見, 可愛陌生人, Tạm biệt người dưng thân thương) - 2016
- And Miles to Go Before I Sleep (九槍) - 2022
