= Vietnamese migrant brides in China =

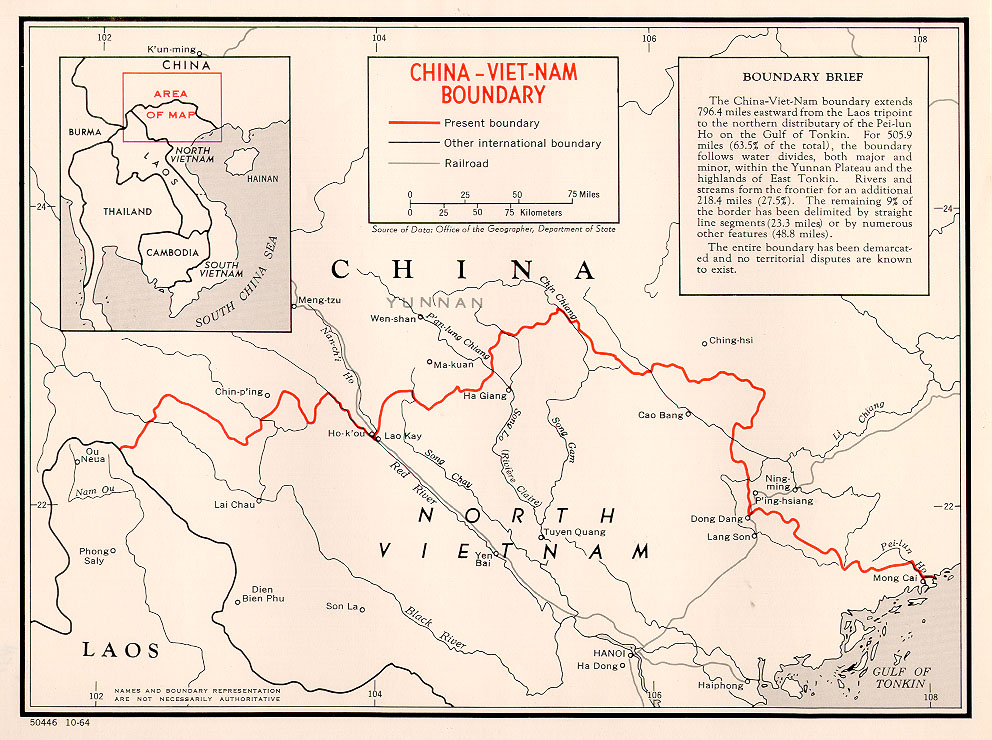
Border between China and Vietnam

Instances of Vietnamese women entering China for marriage, often illegally, have been reported for decades, primarily in areas close to the border with Vietnam. The frequency of migration for marriage has fluctuated over time due to geopolitical events, but it has risen since the 1990s. Official reactions to the practice, both in China and Vietnam, have been varied. Legal marriage between migrants and Chinese men is difficult, and consequently, many marriages are undocumented. In some cases, the Chinese government has tolerated these marriages and allowed for their retroactive authorization, while in others, it has blocked attempts to do so.

A significant number of these marriages are a result of human trafficking. Women and girls are often tricked into being kidnapped and sold to unmarried Chinese men. Villagers in rural China have expressed a lack of concern towards the practice, citing social, physical, and economic difficulties faced by the men who purchase the kidnapped women. Blocking the movement of Vietnamese migrant brides into the country, trafficked or not, is difficult given the ease of discreetly crossing the border. Motives for consensual marriage between Chinese men and Vietnamese women exist based on mutual perceived desirable traits, and websites have been created to facilitate such unions.

== History ==
Illegal crossings and undocumented transnational marriages in the Sino-Vietnamese border areas have occurred since ancient times, as the border can be crossed with relative ease. From the 1950s to the late 1970s, China and Vietnam had relatively good relations, and the government of China legally sanctioned transnational marriages and allowed Vietnamese wives to register for permanent residency in China. In 1953, a study of 20 border villages in Longzhou County recorded 105 Vietnamese wives, representing 36–45% of marriages in some villages. The deterioration of relations between China and Vietnam in the late 1970s led to military conflicts along the border, causing a sharp decline in the frequency of transnational marriages. However, they did not completely stop; a 1986 study of one area of the border documented 122 Vietnamese women who entered China for marriage from 1979 to 1985. In another survey of two villages near the border between Guangxi in China and Vietnam's Lạng Sơn province carried out from 2012 to 2014, it was found that only one of the five married women who had come to the villages in the 1970s was from China; the other four were from Vietnam.

Following the end of the border conflict, with the normalization of China–Vietnam relations in 1991, transnational marriages began to grow in popularity. Hundreds of undocumented transnational marriages occurred in Jingxi and Longzhou counties during the late 1980s and early 1990s. By 2004, the number of transnational marriages in the five border cities and counties of Daxin, Dongxing, Longzhou, Ningming, and Pingxiang had reached over five thousand. The 2000 Chinese census brought the extent of these illicit unions to the attention of the government. The authorities allowed for the children, and sometimes partners, of such marriages to register as household members (through the hukou system), as long as a fine for illegal birth was paid. Unauthorized marriage partners were treated as "actual Chinese citizens" and not regarded as a threat to social order or border stability. By the mid-2000s, however, tolerance for transnational marriages had declined. Some Vietnamese women reported having their status as household members revoked in 2007 due to their national origin. The 2010 Chinese census did not record undocumented spouses, and in 2013, it was reported that the Ministry of Civil Affairs did not recognize such marriages or include them in official statistics. Instead, there is a special county-level alternative census, whose data is considered a state secret and not publicly disclosed.

While transnational marriages (not only with migrants from Vietnam, but also Laos and Myanmar) have been historically common in China's border regions, since 2010 they have become popular in interior provinces of China as well. These provinces include Anhui, Henan, Hubei, and Jiangxi. Registering for permanent residence is difficult — as of 2018, not a single Vietnamese wife had been granted permanent residence in Hubei.

== Trafficking ==
Many Vietnamese migrant brides are victims of human trafficking. Girls are considered a "prized commodity" in rural China as a result of the country's adoption of the one-child policy in 1979, which led to widespread sex-selective abortion and female infanticide due to a cultural preference for male children. According to United Nations projections, China was estimated to have 30–40 million more men of marriageable age than women by the year 2020. For men in poorer areas, "buying" a trafficked bride is seen as an economical alternative to paying a dowry for a local one. Vietnamese boys are paid to seduce and capture girls to sell to Chinese men. According to Nguyễn Tuờng Long, the head of the local Department of Social Evils Prevention in Lào Cai province in 2017, when asked why they engage in these kidnappings, the boys would say "[they] wanted a new iPhone".

Yuanxiao, an individual of Chinese origin whose mother had been a trafficked Vietnamese bride, recounted how their mother had been tricked into coming to a Chinese farm in western Guangdong. According to Yuanxiao, these farms were established to help resettle ethnic Chinese people who fled Vietnam in 1978, becoming popular trafficking destinations due to the large number of people who spoke both Chinese and Vietnamese. Yuanxiao's father and mother (respectively aged 29 and 17 years) were wed illicitly in 1992 with little ceremony.

According to surveys carried out in Jingxi, Longzhou, Napo, Pingxiang, and Tiandeng counties from 2012 to 2016, people in rural villages see marriage predominantly as a biological and cultural necessity, with few respondents naming "mutual affection" as a reason for marrying. According to one villager in Longzhou County, "a man's marriage is not only his personal affair but that of his entire family. The whole family counts on him to pass on the family name." The researchers who performed the study claimed that such views represent the idea that marriage in rural China stems from a traditional patrilineal, patriarchal family system. Villagers interviewed also indicated that marriage is an economic strategy: men receive a new source of labor through their children and can be supported by their children and wives in old age. In China, children are both culturally and legally obligated to support their parents. The villagers expressed concern over unmarried men, who will be economically disadvantaged. Many of them did not view the men who purchase trafficked Vietnamese women as evil, but instead as economically and socially disadvantaged. Multiple interviewees, including some of the trafficked wives themselves, explained that the men who purchased them were often poor or physically (in one case, neurologically) disabled.

In the early 2020s, as a result of the COVID-19 pandemic and the border fortifications created by China in response, the flow of trafficked women across the Sino-Vietnamese border largely ceased. By mid-2023, according to an article in The Wall Street Journal, there were signs that the trafficking was beginning to resume. In May of that year, a seven-passenger sport-utility vehicle with 14 occupants flipped over a cliff at Jingxi, killing 11. Vietnamese media reported that all victims were Vietnamese, and local authorities said they would investigate the incident as potential human smuggling. In February, Vietnam's Ministry of Public Security had reported that police in Bac Lieu province in southern Vietnam busted a trafficking ring that sold girls less than 16 years of age to China for marriage.

== Legal status ==
The Chinese government's attempts to end the cross-border marriage system have been unsuccessful. In the 1980s, the country's officials tried to deport unauthorized female Vietnamese immigrants back to Vietnam, but the task was difficult. Attempting to fully control the border is costly due to the existence of trails, streams, and rivers that allow for virtually undetected border crossings. Even Vietnamese women with legal permission to enter China often prefer to cross the border illegally for shopping, doing business, or visiting relatives, as illegal crossings are seen as quicker and more efficient than going through ports of entry. In 1983, China began requiring all Vietnamese individuals seeking transnational marriage to have a foreign residence permit issued by the government of Vietnam and a marriage certification issued by the government of Vietnam and approved by the government of China. Given the difficulty of obtaining the necessary documents and certifications, this practice essentially ensured that transnational marriages remained undocumented.

In 1995, China relaxed its restrictions and allowed for Vietnamese immigrants to marry with only locally issued and confirmed documents and certifications. However, most immigrants had not arrived legally and therefore unable to obtain the necessary documents. The Vietnamese government was not supportive of its citizens marrying Chinese nationals, and such marriages were annulled by the National Assembly of Vietnam in 2000. These laws essentially blocked the legalization of transnational marriages.

Another complicating factor in obtaining the necessary documents for legal marriage is the cost and difficulty of obtaining a required premarital health report. As of 2022, legally documented Vietnamese wives are also required to take additional health checks and HIV tests every year, costing hundreds of yuan. The government of China has enacted such measures due to the high prevalence of HIV in foreign wives, especially around the border. A 2010 study found that 8 out of every 2,500 Vietnamese wives in Guangxi were HIV-positive.

== Views ==
According to social anthropologist Caroline Grillot, Chinese men perceive Vietnamese women as less demanding and more focused on family values than some Chinese women. Other traits of Vietnamese women that are seen as desirable, according to Grillot, include their fair skin, large eyes, and narrow waists. Vietnamese women themselves often prefer Chinese men to Vietnamese men owing to their perceived work ethic and family values. Websites such as ZhongYueLove.com allow for Chinese men to connect with potential Vietnamese brides. The service charges a fee of around 4,000 USD, including non-refundable blind dates, a medical exam, and wedding photography.

A survey conducted in 2009 of married Chinese-Vietnamese couples in 30 villages in the Sino-Vietnamese border area found that 38.6% of marriages were arranged by relatives, 27.2% were for romantic love, 19.5% were brought together by a Vietnamese woman who had married a Chinese man, 8.5% were brought together through matchmaking services, and 6.2% were a result of bridal kidnapping. Liang Maochun and Chen Wen of Jinan University, who conducted the study, found it interesting that the 17 women who reported having been kidnapped did not avoid providing such a sensitive response. The researchers speculated that their painful memories had faded, and further noted that they had no need to conceal these facts, as such marriages were already widely known in the villages and not regarded as serious crimes to be reported. The same survey found that 10% of Chinese husbands reported that their Vietnamese wives had disappeared after several months of marriage or longer and that they had never heard from them again. Multiple residents used the term "marriage fraud" to refer to such instances, believing that such women seek out marriage to exploit Chinese men for their money before making a planned disappearance.

== See also ==
- Asian migrant brides in Japan
- International marriage of Vietnamese women
- Vietnamese migrant brides in Taiwan
