= Millcreek station =

Light rail station in South Salt Lake, Utah, United States

Millcreek
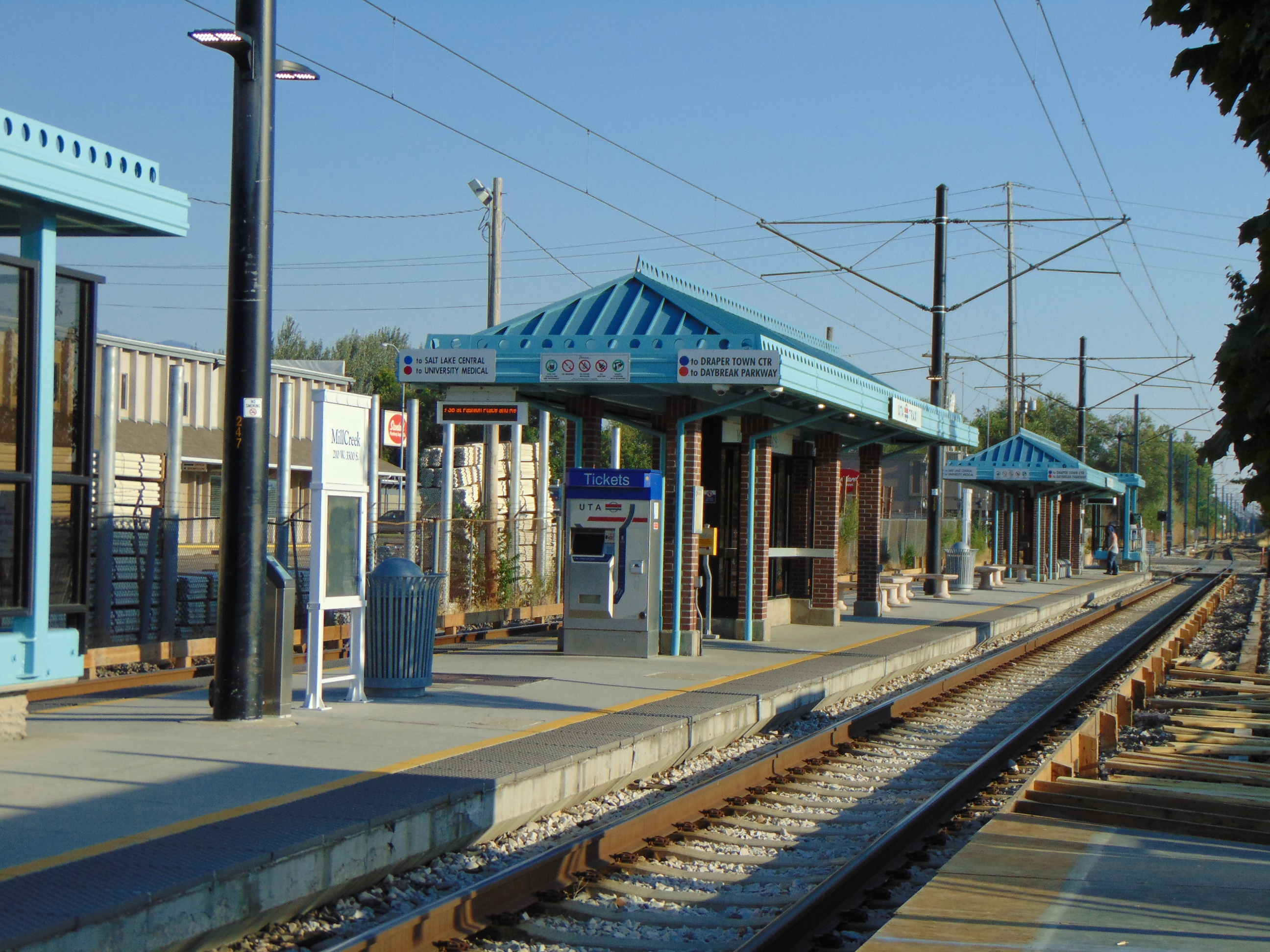
- Millcreek station platform

General information
- Location: 210 West 3300 South; South Salt Lake, Utah; United States
- Coordinates: 40.699606°N 111.894007°W
- Owner: Utah Transit Authority (UTA)
- Platforms: 1 island platform
- Tracks: 2
- Connections: UTA: 33, 35

Construction
- Structure type: At-grade
- Parking: 101 spaces
- Cycle facilities: 2 lockers
- Accessible: Yes

History
- Opened: December 4, 1999; 26 years ago

Services
Preceding station	Utah Transit Authority	Following station
Central Pointe toward Salt Lake Central	Blue Line	Meadowbrook toward Draper Town Center
Central Pointe toward University Medical Center	Red Line	Meadowbrook toward Daybreak Parkway
Former services
Preceding station	Utah Transit Authority	Following station
Central Pointe toward University Medical Center	Sandy/University Line	Meadowbrook toward Sandy Civic Center
Location

Millcreek station is a light rail station in South Salt Lake, Utah, United States serviced by the Blue Line and the Red Line of Utah Transit Authority's TRAX light rail system. The Blue Line provides service from Downtown Salt Lake City to Draper. The Red Line provides service from the University of Utah to the Daybreak community of South Jordan.

== Description ==
The station is located at 210 West 3300 South (SR-171) and is easily accessed from 3300 South (and the nearby I-15/3300 South interchange) via 230 West (Washington Street). However, eastbound buses access the station by turning north on 300 West, then west on West Gregson Avenue, and then south to the station on 230 West.

The station has a free Park and Ride lot with over 100 free parking spaces available. The station opened on December 4, 1999 as part of the first operating segment of the TRAX system and is operated by the Utah Transit Authority.
