= Murray North station =

Light rail station in Murray, Utah, United States

Murray North
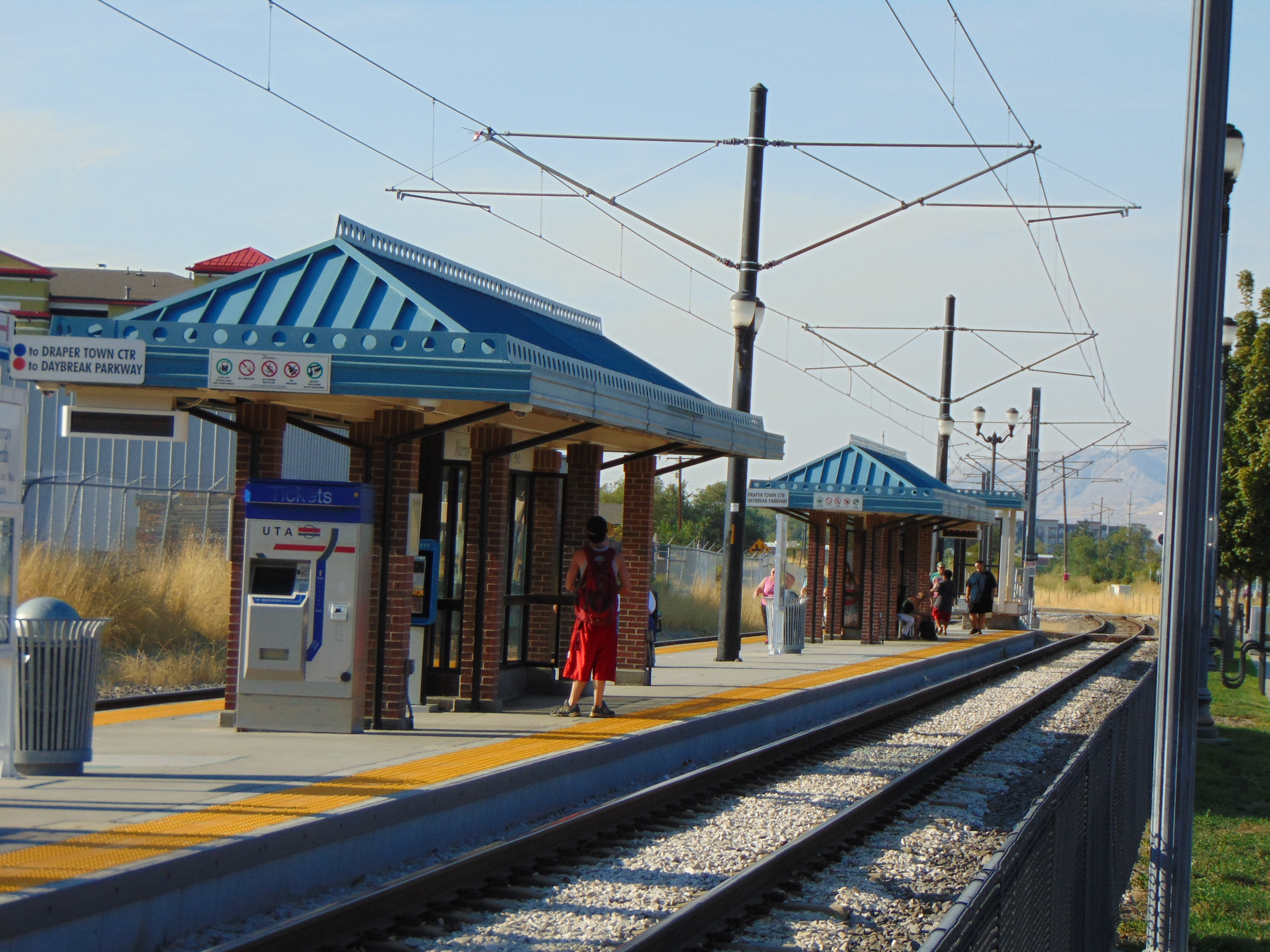
- Murray North station platform

General information
- Location: 71 West Fireclay Avenue (4295 South) (Note: UTA incorrectly indicates that Fireclay Avenue is "4400 South". However, street signs at the intersection of Fireclay Avenue and Birkhill Boulevard (50 West) and at the intersection of Fireclay Avenue and Main Street both show "4295 South"); Murray, Utah; United States
- Coordinates: 40.67677°N 111.89407°W
- Owner: Utah Transit Authority (UTA)
- Platforms: 1 island platform
- Tracks: 2
- Connections: UTA: 47, 205

Construction
- Structure type: At-grade
- Parking: 235 spaces
- Accessible: Yes

History
- Opened: December 4, 1999; 26 years ago

Services
| Preceding station | Utah Transit Authority | Following station |
|---|---|---|
| Meadowbrook toward Salt Lake Central | Blue Line | Murray Central toward Draper Town Center |
| Meadowbrook toward University Medical Center | Red Line | Murray Central toward Daybreak Parkway |
Former services
| Preceding station | Utah Transit Authority | Following station |
|---|---|---|
| Meadowbrook toward University Medical Center | Sandy/University Line | Murray Central toward Sandy Civic Center |
Location

Murray North station is a light rail station in Murray, Utah, United States serviced by the Blue Line and the Red Line of Utah Transit Authority's TRAX light rail system. The Blue Line provides service from Downtown Salt Lake City to Draper. The Red Line provides service from the University of Utah to the Daybreak community of South Jordan.

== Description ==
The station is located at 71 West Fireclay Avenue (4295 South) and is easily accessed from State Street (US-89) by heading west on Fireclay Avenue. The station is also accessible from 4500 South (SR-266) by heading north on Main Street the then west on Fireclay Avenue. There is substantial transit-oriented development under construction near the station. The station has a Park and Ride lot with 235 free parking spaces available. The station opened on 4 December 1999 as part of the first operating segment of the TRAX system and is operated by the Utah Transit Authority
