= Transnational marriage in Japan =

Marriage between Japanese and non-Japanese person

An international marriage in Japan is a marriage between a Japanese and a non-Japanese person, in accordance with the formalities provided by the law of Japan or of a foreign land. Procedures and rules mentioned in this article are mainly those of Japan, but in some cases other requirements are imposed by the homeland of the non-Japanese spouse, or by the foreign land where the concerned couple marry. In general the legality of a marriage for each spouse is determined by the homeland law of the spouse.

== History ==
Marriage between a Japanese national and a non-Japanese person was first officially permitted by act of law on March 14, 1873 (6th year of the Meiji Period), before the former Meiji Constitution (1889) and the former Nationality Law (1899). This day is informally known as International Marriage Day (国際結婚の日)

International marriage at the time required both a permit and surrender of recognised social standing (分限).

During 1986 to 1991, the period of Japanese bubble economy, labor shortages for "3D jobs" (dirty, dangerous, and demeaning) occurred in Japan. This situation created expand the migrant labor rates. However, the revised policy in 1990 prohibited unrestricted economic activities except for only four kinds of visa, which include the "Spouse or child of a Japanese national". This policy legalizes all kinds of economic activity for marriage migrations.

== Homeland law ==
According to an Act of Japan on general rules,

- The homeland law of a person is the law of the country of citizenship of the person.
- If a person has more than one citizenship, and if one of the citizenships is Japan, the homeland law is the law of Japan;
- If a person has more than one citizenship, and none of them is Japanese, the homeland law of the person is the law of the country where the person habitually lives.
- as to a concerned person with nationality of a nation in which laws are different according to locality (like the U.S.), the homeland law is the local law under rules of the nation or, if the nation does not have such rules, the homeland law is the law of the local area which is most closely related to the person.

== Required translation ==
Each paper, document mentioned in this article as required by Japan, if not written in Japanese, needs to be accompanied with translation into Japanese; one of the concerned persons can themself be the translator; their name must accompany the translation.

== Legal documents ==
When a Japanese and a non-Japanese are intending to marry

- in accordance with Japanese rules, homeland certification is required regarding the concerned non-Japanese that they are permitted to marry (see the related section below);
- in accordance with foreign law, certification by Japan may also be required.

== Japanese regulations ==
=== Notification ===
If a couple including a Japanese citizen marry in Japan, the marriage is to be in accordance with Japanese law. Thus, Japan requires notification of the marriage. Japan's diplomatic establishments abroad can not legally accept a notification of a marriage of this type.

=== Competence certification as to the concerned non-Japanese ===
Japan requires competence certification as to the concerned non-Japanese, as a paper in principle, to be submitted; if the homeland (state/nation) is one which doesn't issue this certification,

- if the non-Japanese partner swears in the presence of the homeland's consul in Japan that he/she has legal competence under the homeland law to get married with a Japanese citizen, the written oath signed by the consul might be the substitute for this certification paper;
- if even the substitutes can not be submitted, a copy of the homeland law on marriage with its source clarified, and identity certification(s) issued by the homeland's official institution(s) such as a passport, are required instead.

=== Family register ===
The fact the Japanese citizen got married with the non-Japanese is to be recorded in a family register with the concerned Japanese written at its head; if the Japanese is one not written at the head, a new family register for the concerned couple is to be created.

=== Family name ===
While a rule of Japan for the common surname (i.e. family name) is not applied to the couple, the concerned Japanese can change his or her surname to that of the concerned non-Japanese spouse by filing notification as such. This notification, if not within 6 months of the day the marriage became effective, needs permission in advance from a family court.

== International marriages in accordance with foreign legislation ==
=== Competence certification as to the concerned Japanese ===
If competence certification as to the concerned Japanese is required, the Japanese can request this certification as a paper

- issued in Japanese of a Legal Affairs Bureau (法務局);
- issued in Japanese of the municipality of the domicile of family register (本籍地の市町村);
- issued in a foreign language of a Japan's diplomatic establishment abroad (日本の在外公館);

this certification paper is called "Kon'in-Yōken Gubi Shōmeisho" (婚姻要件具備証明書, Certificate of Legal Capacity to Contract Marriage) in Japanese.

=== Certification as to the marriage ===
By a delivery of an authorized copy of certification as to the marriage issued by the foreign land, the marriage is regarded under Japanese law as one in accordance with the formality of the foreign land. The Japanese government requires non-Japanese citizens to provide a sworn Affidavit of Competency to Marry, which is issued by their original country's embassy.

=== Marriage approval ===
All marriages must be registered at a Japanese municipal government office. Note that that consular officers are unable to perform marriage registration, and neither can religious or fraternal bodies in Japan.

=== Notification ===
Japan requires the authorized copy of certification as to the marriage

- to be submitted to a Japan's diplomatic establishment abroad (日本の在外公館), or,
- to be sent by post or submitted to the municipality of the domicile of family register (本籍地の市町村),

within 3 months of the day the marriage became effective. When the authorized copy of certification is legally accepted, the marriage is to be recorded in the family register of the Japanese spouse.

== Intermarriage by nationality ==
=== Korean-Japanese ===
After marriage, most of the Korean residents would still treat themselves as ethnically Korean, but without direct relation to North or South Korea anymore. Obtaining a Japanese citizenship would not amount to a betrayal of their Korean identity.

=== Chinese-Japanese ===
Ethnic Chinese from both mainland China and Taiwan in Japan intermarry with the residents. Japanese and Chinese are commonly spoken at home.

=== Filipino-Japanese ===
The Filipino language causes considerable difficulties for international marriages to Japanese. Children within Filipino-Japanese families are usually required to learn Filipino, Japanese and English, with the purpose of communicating with Filipino relatives, daily communication (living in Japan) and exploring the international world. The identity of being "doubles" (both Japanese and Filipino) is expected of a child.

=== American-Japanese ===
According to the National Institute of Population and Social Security Research, American husbands make up 17% of all foreign husbands in Japan, while American wives make up 1% of foreign wives in Japan. Since 1965, the percentage of marriages to American women has declined precipitously, from 6% to 1%, which can be attributed to the long-term decline of the Japanese economy.

== Marriage and divorce trends ==
=== Marriage ===
Since 2012, the number of marriages between Japanese citizens has declined every year, while the number of international marriages has remained stable. In 2018, there were 21,852 international marriages registered within Japan. This accounts for 4% of all marriages. As the number of foreigners is expected to increase, the number of international marriages is also expected to increase.

=== Divorce ===
International marriages in Japan have a higher rate of divorce than non-international marriages. As of 2018, the rate of divorce for international marriages stands at 50.5%. while for non-international marriages, the rate of divorce is 34.9%.

== See also ==
- Asian migrant brides in Japan
- Family marriage law in Japan
- International child abduction in Japan
