= Peter Nguyen Van Hung =

Vietnamese Catholic priest (born 1958)

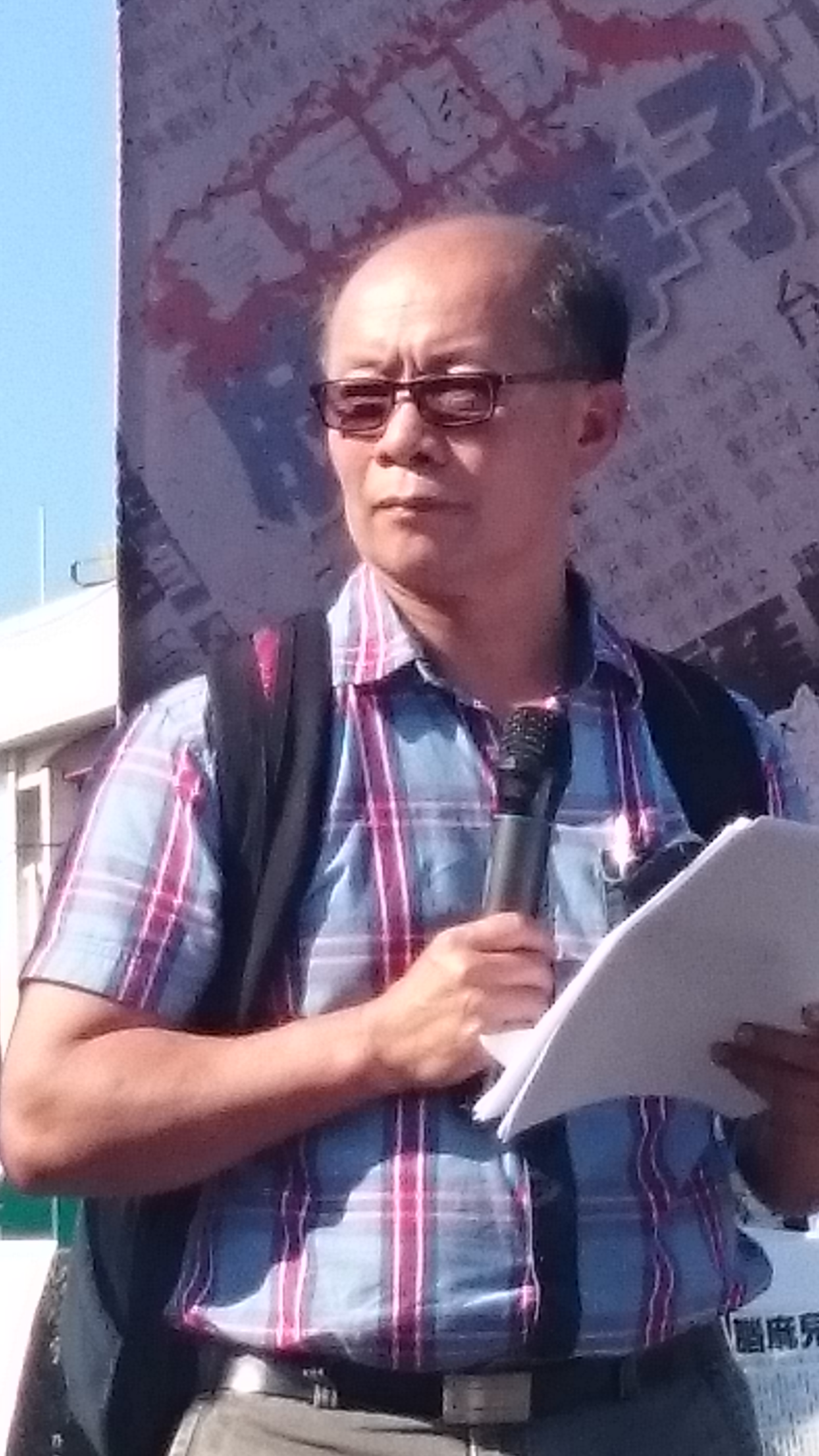
Peter Nguyen Van Hung on Ketagalan Boulevard (December 2015)

Peter Nguyen Van Hung (Vietnamese: Phêrô Nguyễn Văn Hùng; Chinese: 阮文雄; pinyin: Ruǎn Wénxióng; born 1958) is a Vietnamese Australian Catholic priest and human rights activist in Taiwan. He was recognized by the United States Department of State as a "hero acting to end modern day slavery".

== Early life ==
Peter Nguyen Van Hung grew up in a lower-middle-class family outside of Bình Tuy Province in South Vietnam, with two brothers and five sisters. His father was a fisherman, but died after a long battle with illness, forcing his mother, a devout Catholic with roots in the country's north, to become the family's main breadwinner. Peter Nguyen Van Hung himself followed in his mother's faith.

He left Vietnam in 1979 on an overcrowded boat; rescued by a Norwegian ship after just 36 hours and taken to Japan, he joined the Missionary Society of St. Columban upon his arrival there.

He lived in Japan for three years, studying and taking a variety of jobs to support himself, including as a highway repairman, steel factory worker, and gravedigger. He first came to Taiwan in 1988 as a missionary, after which he went to Sydney, New South Wales, Australia, to study at a seminary. He was ordained in 1991 and returned to Taiwan the following year (in 1992).

== Work in Taiwan ==
Peter Nguyen Van Hung established the Vietnamese Migrant Workers and Brides Office in Taoyuan County (now Taoyuan City) in 2004 to offer assistance to Vietnamese immigrants in Taiwan. Vietnamese American radio station Little Saigon Radio and others helped him to rent the second floor of a grammar school; two seventy square foot rooms offer sleeping space, while two others are used for office space. They provide Mandarin classes, room and board, and legal assistance.

Peter Nguyen Van Hung's exposure of abuses against foreign laborers and brides led the U.S. State Department to list Taiwan as a "Tier 2" region alongside countries such as Cambodia due to their lack of effort in combating human trafficking, which proved a major international embarrassment for the island's government. His work has also made him the target of intimidation in Taiwan.
