= MV Van Hung =

History
- Name: Van Hung
- Owner: Vinashin Ocean Shipping Co Ltd
- Port of registry: Vietnam
- Completed: 1996
- Identification: IMO number: 9122320; MMSI number: 574491000; Callsign: 3WQZ
- Status: Active

General characteristics
- Type: Single Decker
- Tonnage: 4,914 GT
- Length: 112.5 metres (369 ft)
- Beam: 18.2 metres (60 ft)
- Draft: 6 metres (20 ft)
- Decks: 1
- Speed: 13.5 kn

Van Hung is a cargo vessel, registered in Vietnam. The container ship delivers cargo around the coast of Vietnam, mainly between the cities of Ho Chi Minh City and Da Nang.

== Description ==
The single deck ship was built in 1996, and measures 112.5 metres (369 ft) by 18.2 metres (60 ft) with a gross tonnage of 4914 tonnes.
