= Meadowbrook station (Utah Transit Authority) =

Light rail station in South Salt Lake, Utah, United States

Meadowbrook
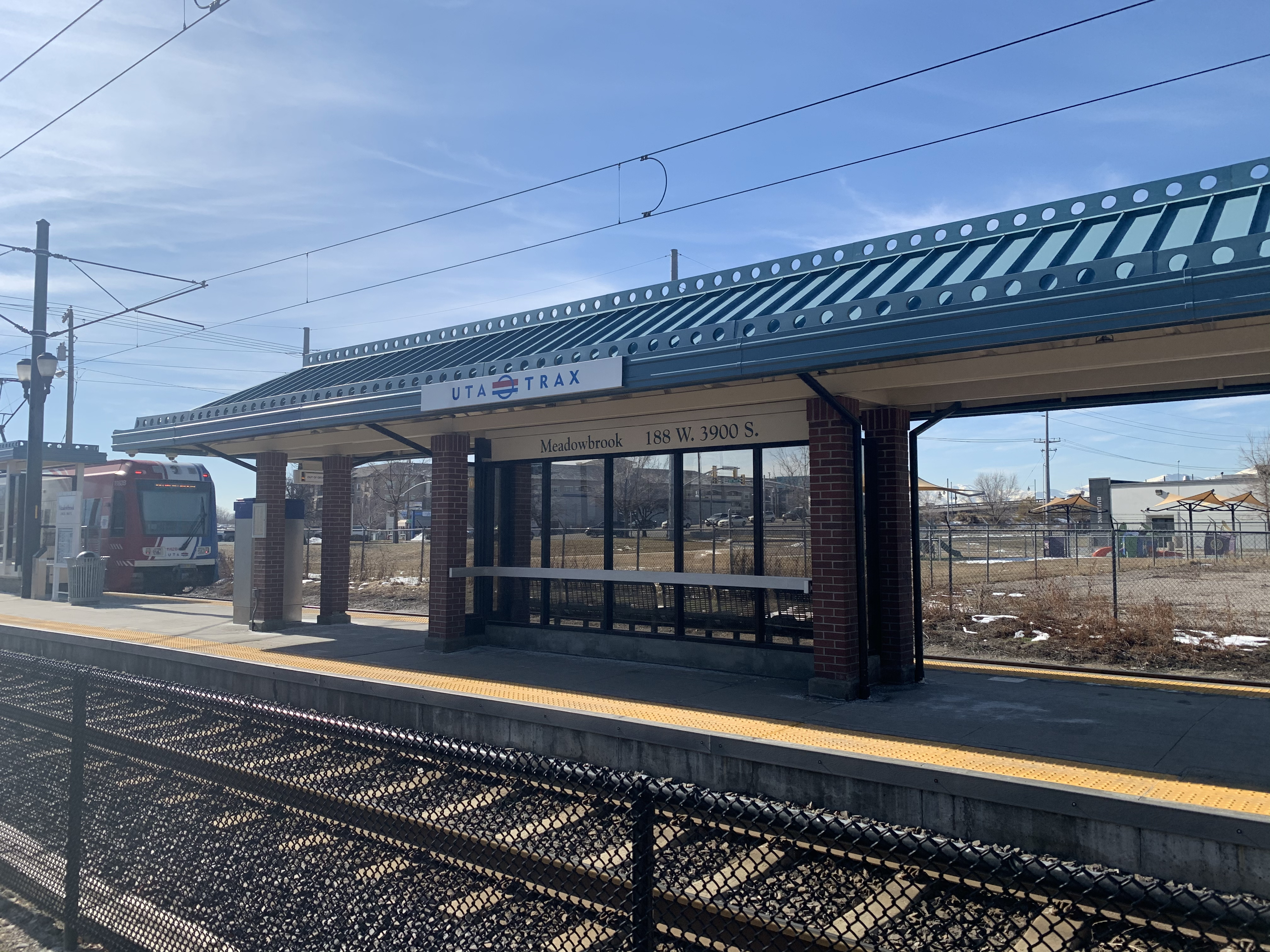
- Meadowbrook station platform

General information
- Location: 188 West 3900 South; South Salt Lake, Utah; United States
- Coordinates: 40.68773°N 111.89665°W
- Owner: Utah Transit Authority (UTA)
- Platforms: 1 island platform
- Tracks: 2
- Connections: UTA: 39

Construction
- Structure type: At-grade
- Parking: 497 spaces
- Cycle facilities: 2 lockers
- Accessible: Yes

History
- Opened: December 4, 1999; 26 years ago

Services
| Preceding station | Utah Transit Authority | Following station |
|---|---|---|
| Millcreek toward Salt Lake Central | Blue Line | Murray North toward Draper Town Center |
| Millcreek toward University Medical Center | Red Line | Murray North toward Daybreak Parkway |
Former services
| Preceding station | Utah Transit Authority | Following station |
|---|---|---|
| Millcreek toward University Medical Center | Sandy/University Line | Murray North toward Sandy Civic Center |
Location

Meadowbrook station is a light rail station in South Salt Lake, Utah, served by the Blue Line and the Red Line of Utah Transit Authority's TRAX light rail system. The Blue Line provides service from Downtown Salt Lake City to Draper. The Red Line provides service from the University of Utah to the Daybreak community of South Jordan.

== Description ==
The station is located at 188 West 3900 South and is easily accessed from West Temple and westbound 3900 South; however, vehicles traveling east on 3900 South must access the station by turning north onto West Temple (as left turns into the station from 3900 South are not permitted. About a block north of the station is a large townhouse development. The station has a free Park and Ride lot with nearly 500 free parking spaces available. The station opened on 4 December 1999 as part of the first operating segment of the TRAX system and is operated by the Utah Transit Authority.
