= Vietnamese migrant brides in Taiwan =

Vietnamese migrant brides in Taiwan represent marriages between Taiwanese men and Vietnamese brides who are mostly from poor, rural areas of South Vietnam, such as those along the Mekong Delta. As of 2006, out of Taiwan’s immigrant population of approximately 428,240 people (up from 30,288 in 1991), 18% were females who had relocated to the country through marriage. Out of this population, about 85% originated from the Southeast Asian countries of Vietnam, Indonesia, Thailand, and Philippines, with the majority hailing from Vietnam. It is estimated that between the years of 1995 and 2003, the number of Vietnamese women married to Taiwanese men increased from 1,476 to more than 60,000 individuals, making the Vietnamese the largest non-Chinese immigrant group living in the island. This event has been seen locally and abroad as something that can potentially evolve into a concerning societal and humanitarian issue. This issue is not just localised in Taiwan but also in Southern China provinces as well as Hong Kong and Macau. In every case, these practices are illegal and are classified under human trafficking.

== The Migrant Marriage Process ==
Taiwanese men (as well as Chinese men) who are single, aging, and poor, often will seek a Vietnamese wife (who are also often poor and from disadvantaged areas) will often pay a fee of between around US$7,000 and $10,000 to a broker. This is followed by a visit to Vietnam where they view and are introduced to a number of potential "brides". The man selects a bride from the women that he meets and if it can be arranged, they marry and the bride moves to Taiwan/China. Most of the matchmaking takes place through intermediaries. Usually there is a local sub-agent who the Taiwanese man approaches in Taiwan. The sub-agent usually works through a larger organization that has some sort of counterpart operating in Vietnam. At the Vietnam end a similar process operates with local sub-agents and matchmakers. Travel agents, brokers, travel providers, officials, and interpreters are usually also involved in the process as well. The TECO in Ho Chi Minh City reported in 1999 that they deal with around 250 matchmaking rings.

== Reasons for Becoming a Migrant Bride ==
The circumstances of the Vietnamese that go to Taiwan as brides are common. Most brides come from the remote countryside of Vietnam, with more than half of the Vietnamese migrant brides coming from the rural Mekong Delta region. As is also common in labor migration, the primary motivation in most migrant marriages, from the female perspective, is economy and security. The majority of Vietnamese women come from families that suffer from unpaid debts, bad seasons of crop, or jobless family members. Marriage brokers promise a life of prosperity overseas. While a Taiwanese man may pay up to $10,000 USD to arrange for a migrant marriage, the woman’s family may only see as little as $100 USD of that money, with the broker taking the rest. Nevertheless, most women, in agreeing to marriage, are under the impression that they will be able to find work in Taiwan and send money back to their families in Vietnam. In one survey of origin households in Vietnam, researchers asked the parents of marriage migrants why their daughters chose to migrate to Taiwan. The top three answers reported were “To help the family” (61.6%), “For a better life” (10.8%), and “To make parents happy” (6.3%).

== Reasons for Choosing a Migrant Bride ==
Taiwanese men who marry women from Southeast Asia are typically drawn from a less educated and disadvantaged population. While Taiwanese husbands tend to have more education than their Vietnamese brides, they still fall below the average levels of education in Taiwan. Many times a man can be more than a decade, or possibly two to three decades, older than his migrant bride. Seventy percent of Vietnamese brides are under 23 years of age, while over eighty percent of their Taiwanese grooms are aged over 30. All of these factors (lack of education, disadvantage, and advanced age) typically contribute to trouble in finding a bride locally and thus increase the desire to enter a migrant marriage. For many Taiwanese men, migrant marriages can seem like an easy solution to their household troubles, as a wife can act as a reproductive unit, a housekeeper, and a nurse to his parents. In one study, the percentage of women who reported “housework” as their primary occupation rose from 16.7% while located in Vietnam to 52.4% after being relocated to Taiwan. As can be seen in a woman’s primary motivation for marriage (“To help the family”), the Vietnamese have strong familial ties and apparently practice subservience to a patriarchal structure within a Confucian system. This trait is highly prized by some Taiwanese men who feel that Taiwanese women are beginning to wrest away from the constraints of a patriarchal society. As such, marrying a foreign women may be an attempt by Taiwanese men to "reassert" ancient patriarch values.

== Acclimating to Taiwanese Society and Culture ==
Because of their remote, rural origins, Vietnamese migrant brides often lack basic knowledge of what their life will be like in Taiwan. Despite increased resources and amenities, migrant brides often find it difficult to deal with cultural and other issues, some of which include large age gaps with their husbands, demanding in-laws, and difficulties with the language barrier. Although Mandarin language classes are available in Taiwan, many men are not willing to pay the fees for such education, and others seem to prefer their wives continue to be isolated through language.

=== In the Public and Private Spheres ===
In Taiwanese society, all migrant brides are often stigmatized for their poor class, gender position, and the commodified nature of their marriage (Wang 2008). In the nation's mainstream media, they are often portrayed as either "passive victims" or "materialistic gold diggers," and their husbands are often seen as being morally and intellectually inferior. Migrant brides are also seen as unfit to bear legitimate Taiwanese citizens. In 2006, out of every 100 births, 12 were the product of a migrant marriage. Though in recent years public officials in Taiwan have increasingly promoted fertility, in 2004 the Vice Minister of Education Chou Tsan-Te expressed his concern about the "low quality" of immigrants and remarked that "foreign brides should not have so many children."

It can also be very difficult for Vietnamese and other migrant brides to acclimate to their own household. Taiwanese men tend to look at their brides as a financial investment, and expect to be repaid for their monetary loss through reproductive and domestic work. Migrant brides are often expected to work long hours in the household, constantly serve their husband's parents, and prove their worth by bearing healthy children. As in most patriarchal societies, boys are always preferred. If a migrant bride cannot become pregnant or fails to produce a male heir, they run the risk of their husband divorcing them and often face unbearably abusive behavior from both their husband and his parents.

=== HIV/AIDS Stigmatization ===
Foreign brides are also often stigmatized for being seen as a contributing source to the growing HIV/AIDS presence in Taiwan. Taiwanese society often treats migrant brides as a threat to public health and a large burden to the nation, despite the fact that the highest point of infection among foreign brides peaked in 1998 with 1.31% of incoming brides testing positive for the HIV/AIDs virus. Any foreigner who tests positive for the HIV/AIDs virus in Taiwan must leave the country immediately.

=== "Taiwan Disillusionment" ===
Many brides experience what is known as the "Taiwan Disillusionment," where due to their inferior position in their own family and in Taiwanese society in general, they attempt to obtain divorces. In the years of 1999 to 2000, there were 170 cases of divorce concerning a migrant individual. While some brides who obtain divorces return home to Vietnam, others, realizing some of the amenities they have grown accustomed to would be loss to them, often stay and try to find work in Taiwan. This can often be very difficult due to their poor education and language skills. Also difficult to cope with in the event of a divorce is the almost certain loss of custody of any children the couple may have had together, as under Taiwanese law, they belong to the father.

== Human Trafficking and Abuse Concerns ==
Because a migrant bride is often extremely dependent on her husband upon arriving in Taiwan, it is easy for her to fall victim to abuse or human trafficking. Although many claim incidents of extreme abuse are exacerbated by the media, the matter is by no means unheard of. Many women report being held in isolation by their husbands, who control the monetary funds of the household and often take control of their IDs to stop them from traveling long distances. Taiwanese men often bar their foreign wives from making friends or phone calls, and migrant brides are often unaware of the local laws they can use to assert their rights. For those who do not speak Mandarin, getting help is almost impossible, and furthermore, those who do know the language claim that local authorities and shelters treat them as second-class citizens and often refuse to listen to their stories.

== Legal Action Against the Migrant Marriage Practice ==
In the 2000s, foreign brides in Taiwan were considered by the public to be victims of marriage brokerage or objects for sale. Therefore the Taiwanese government was put under a lot of pressure to solve the issue, not only from domestic media but also from the international community (for example the United Nations) who perceived the foreign brides phenomenon as part of an anti-trafficking campaign. This resulted in the Taiwanese government banning transnational commercial matchmaking in 2007 in an amendment to Immigration law. The amendment states that only individuals and non-profit organizations can provide matchmaking services. It has also prohibited advertising of these services in the mass media.

As a result, several hundred registered brokering companies were shut down and as of 2015 there were only about 40 operating non-profit organizations of transnational matchmaking in Taiwan. This did not necessarily solve the issue as many of these non-profit organizations were the original commercial brokers that just changed their names and the way of charging fees for services.

In 2020, a Vietnamese man posted several photos of Vietnamese women for the purpose of dating potential spouses. The description of the photos included the age and marital status of these women. For violation of the Immigration Act, he was fined TWD 100,000 by the Immigration Department of the Republic of China.

In early April 2007, police in Ho Chi Minh City broke up a matchmaking ring and arrested two suspected marriage brokers. A subsequent raid on a home turned up more than 100 women seeking husbands.

== Organizations Helping Foreign Brides ==
Because of the above-mentioned problems that foreign brides have to deal with, local governments have established Foreign Spouse Family Service Centers, which are facilities supposed to help foreign spouses. They are meant to provide general assistance and put foreign spouses in contact with relevant authorities. The government’s plan is to have at least one center in each town, but so far it has not been achieved because of the supposed lack of qualified institutions to support the centers.

At the same time, non-profit organizations financially supported by the state have been established in Taiwan. Their goal is to assist these women in adapting to a new life. The staff are local people who facilitate an easier exchange of information between women and the government. They also manage the Foreign Spouse Family Service Centers and set them into local communities. In addition, regular workshops and "foreign spouse life adaptation classes" were created, which educate them about Taiwanese culture. In order to enable foreign brides to communicate better with their new family members and to assist their children with studying or finding a new job, Mandarin and Taiwanese language classes are provided. Furthermore, 'multicultural' workshops and social events, where women have the opportunity to share parts of their culture with local people, are organized. Brides have the opportunity to participate in dance performances, food exhibitions, or give lectures to local children in schools. On the one hand, these events help women to integrate among locals, but on the other hand, they draw more attention to their "difference" and thus widen the gap between the Taiwanese and them.

The Pearl S. Buck Foundation in Taipei has been dedicated to helping foreign brides and their children in Taiwan since 1997. The foundation offers a wide range of different activities. In 2022, the ‘’New Residents Market 2.0’’ was organized by members of this foundation and other sponsors. The aim of this event was a cultural exchange between locals and foreign brides who had the opportunity to introduce the culture of their native country to the local people, including their authentic exotic food and products.

== See also ==
- Asian migrant brides in Japan
- International marriage of Vietnamese women
- Vietnamese migrant brides in China
