= Asian migrant brides in Japan =

Asian migrant and marriage in Japan

The increasing number of Asian migrant brides in Japan marrying Japanese men is a phenomenon occurring in both rural and urban Japan. Since the mid 1980s, rural Japanese men have begun taking foreign Asian brides, from the Philippines, Sri Lanka, Thailand, China and South Korea, as a way of compensating for the reduced number of Japanese women of marriageable, childbearing age who are willing to marry rural Japanese men. The phenomenon later spread to urban parts of Japan as well. The phenomenon has created a new industry of foreign marriage brokering that uses both local governments and private organizations to facilitate the immigration of foreign brides. This is largely a result of an aging population in Japan where approximately 20% of the population is over the age of 65, which is exceptionally high, a fertility rate of only 1.3, and increased opportunities for women and increased costs in child care.

== Causes ==
It is difficult to identify a single direct cause for the practice of foreign brides because it is really the product of an environment. However, there are several factors which have contributed to the environment that fosters this practice. Since 1955 women have increased from 15% to 40% of the work force, reducing the availability to bear children. There is the undesirability of the role of a rural housewife. Many women prefer not to be in this role as it severely limits career opportunities and has a social stigma. Rural wives are expected to care for their husbands' parents. This can be a very traumatic experience as the relationship between the mother-in-law and daughter-in-law is very often abusive. In addition to these duties, a wife will have the burdens of child rearing, household and financial management, and in many cases a share of the agricultural work. Overall, the declining number of marriages is responsible for 50% of the drop in birthrate.

Another aspect that contributes to the phenomenon is the aging population of Japan. For the first time since the 19th century, Japan has been experiencing a population decline during peacetime. While there are still many available women of marrying and childbearing age now, the trend of aging in Japanese society will become self-sustaining at some point. Since 1995, Japan has experienced a decrease in the production population, those who are aged 15 to 64. There will simply be fewer women to fill these roles. And, as a result of fewer women, there will be fewer children. Marriage rates for women aged 25 to 29 dropped from 82% to 52% from 1970 to 1995.

While this is still far into the future, in some places schools have been replaced with senior centers as there are no children to attend classes.

== Financial aspects or costs ==
While obtaining accurate and reliable information about the financial aspects of the importation of wives is understandably difficult since the majority of these arrangements are not widely publicized, the information that is available comes primarily from the agencies that facilitate these transactions. Japanese men have reportedly paid as much as $20,000 (USD) to these agencies for this type of transaction. Of this payment, as much as $3,000 is being paid as a dowry to the bride's family. The rest of the $20,000 is theoretically being allocated to travel expenses, and presents for the bride. Once again, however, these figures are somewhat ambiguous for obvious reasons.

The practice of importing brides is further encouraged by some local governments, which have established matchmaking and marriage counseling services. Furthermore, some local governments have also attempted to influence marriage by increasing taxes on singles, and providing financial rewards for clubs called koryukai, that provide meetings with eligible women. Local governments have even gone so far as to assist farmers with finding foreign brides in some cases.

== Suppliers ==
There has only been a limited amount of study concerning the foreign bride industry in Japan. Much of what is known comes from intermediaries that work as brokers. It is common for these middlemen to be of foreign descent themselves, particularly from East or South East Asia. In fact, many brokers are former brides themselves. The broker's goal is to facilitate the transition for the foreign brides and arrange the dowry to be paid by the woman's family. In turn, the prices for the would-be husbands tend to be high, in the upwards of US$20,000.

Scott Gorman describes in The Marriage Broker how a typical middleman works. Gorman introduces Keiko, an assumed name of a Chinese broker, and discusses her recruiting and business strategy in her native China. Her goal is to facilitate the transition for the Chinese women and arrange a dowry to be paid to the women's families. Once the dowry and service fees are paid, the final stages of the transaction occur. Immigration and visa forms and requirements will be worked out in coordination with the broker and bride, and the actual wedding ceremony, if it is desired by both parties, will be planned Keiko will not reveal the price of her service, but she will admit that it is not inexpensive. According to Keiko, a foreign bride herself, she was one of only seven foreign brides in her area when she arrived nearly 20 years ago; today there are approximately 800, 28 of which are the product of her services.

Although much of this industry is private, local governments have become more involved due to the declining birthrates and the less than enthusiastic appeal of rural bachelors. In fact, the first government to establish a claim and promote the foreign bride service occurred as early as 1985 in a rural village of the Yamagata prefecture.

Though foreign brides are exported to all parts of Japan, the vast majority are being sent to rural villages and prefectures. This is mostly due to population decline, but also because of anti-rural sentiment expressed among many Japanese single women (due to many factors: agricultural work expectance, mother-in-law issues, etc.). Tomoko Nakamatsu, author of Faces of "Asian Brides" goes on further to state:

A large number of local governments in rural areas had implemented programmes to encourage (domestic) marriage among their residents. Under the policies of supporting depopulated areas, state funds were available for implementing these programmes. In the 1970s, the terms "hanayome ginkō (brides bank)" or "hanayome sentā (brides centre)" were widely used for these schemes, which aimed to make a list of available single women.

So even before foreign bride services came into prominence, during the 1970s local government boards promoted hanayome ginkō (brides bank)" or "hanayome sentā (brides centre)" to encourage Japanese women from urban areas to consider marrying rural villagers. But with the 1980s economic boom, the newly cemented middle/upper middle class population seized control of the international arena, and with it came the birth of the foreign bride trade in Japan.

Most foreign wives are of Asian descent because Western women and Japanese men tend to regard one another as undesirable marriage partners, for reasons of physical attractiveness and cultural values. Many of these wives come from China, the Philippines, South Korea, Thailand and Sri Lanka.

== Typical background of the foreign bride ==
There has been little documentation on the types of women that are recruited for immigration. However, there are many allusions to the premise that they are all from rural and impoverished families, as was the type of background the marriage broker Keiko came from. A newspaper story written The Philippines seems to corroborate that assumption. In the article, a Filipino mayor criticized the foreign bride business in his country, stating that his government was "giving away unspoiled women in the countryside." This statement leads to the assumption that the women are from rural areas.

== Controversies ==
While the practice of importing foreign wives has been present in Japanese society for more than thirty years, it is still too soon to understand the long-term effects. The inability to determine the effects is because foreign bride importation is still not a common enough occurrence to get the solid data needed to comprise a thorough statistical analysis. However, the moral consequences that have risen from the industry can be examined.

The first set of consequences is the negative ones. In essence, a form of human trafficking has been created. While presumably all of the participants are volunteers, there is no official form of regulation, which creates the potential for exploiting young females. The potential for this is high since there is in fact a payment to the woman's family through the third party broker. The broker and the farmer have no way of knowing if the girl has been sent willingly by her family or if this is a form of forced prostitution or perhaps even slavery. In a worst-case scenario, the woman may not even be related to the family that is profiting from her dowry; the real possibility exists that woman being "sold" is a kidnap victim and the family are effectively slave traders. There are no safeguards against this.

Another possibility is that the woman is a con artist who will simply skip out of her new marriage once the dowry has been paid. As the marriage broker Keiko noted, there have been cases of the women returning to China or disappearing to urban Japan. The unwitting husband would have no way of knowing if the marriage broker was involved in this scam or if the broker was also a victim of the woman. As the women are foreigners, it would be very difficult to track them down once they had returned to their country of origin. Even if they are able to find the woman, the Japanese men may not have Legal recourse to collect damages or compensation.

The final possible negative consequence is the possibility that women will be placed with an abusive or exploitative husband. These women are not given citizenship immediately and may or may not have the skills to seek the protection of the Japanese judiciary system should the husband be abusive. If the woman is being forced into any form of sexual exploitation, physical abuse, or other emotional distress it would be very difficult to uncover, especially if the woman cannot speak Japanese, or is afraid of shaming her family by being unable to fulfill the contractual agreement.

=== Case of Priyani and Mr. Suzuki ===
In 1987, a Sri Lankan woman, known only by her first name, Priyani, had come to Japan for computer training after answering a newspaper advertisement about it. However, she had been taken by a broker who had asked her along with a few other Sri Lankan women to dress nicely because they had a meeting with some Japanese men. She came to realise that she had been scammed into marrying a Japanese businessman known only as Mr. Suzuki and refused to take part in it. She was however told that she would have to repay the broker for flight and lodging because she refused. She eventually agreed to marry the Japanese businessman, however a few months later, while she was out of the country, Mr. Suzuki had informed her that he had wanted a divorce and had obtained a divorce using a forged signature. Through a lawyer, she managed to nullify the divorce and the marriage of Mr. Suzuki with another Sri Lankan woman he had met. A landmark court case in 1991 ultimately led to her being able to get a divorce on her terms. The court case made headlines in Japan and even caught the attention of some sections of the international media. It consequently shed light on the issue of forced marriages between foreign Asian women and Japanese men which at the time had been a little reported issue in Japan.

== Divorce ==
=== Residency status of divorcing foreign spouses ===
In divorce suits involving a foreign spouse, residency status is probably the number one issue in most cases. The residency status of the spouse at the time of divorce is the critical factor in the entire equation. The Immigration Control Act of Japan recognizes 27 types of visas, which include various categories such as Spouse Visa, Instructor Visa, Student Visa, Professor Visa, inter alia. Whether divorce will affect the residency status of the individual depends on the visa held at the time of marital dissolution. For example, if the foreign spouse applied for and obtained either Permanent Residency (eijuusha or eijuuken) or Japanese Citizenship (nihon-kokuseki) during the marriage, then they can remain in Japan after the divorce as their residency status is not dependent on their marital status. Basically, any kind of visa which is not reliant on being married will not be affected by divorce and can be renewed as long as the criteria under which it was issued remain valid.

=== Divorce and spouse visas ===
If an individual holds a Spouse Visa (nihonjin-no-haiguusha), divorce means that this status will be revoked and this particular type of visa cannot be renewed. A Spouse Visa is valid for either a one or three-year period and can be used after divorce until it expires. If the individual wishes to stay in Japan, the visa status must be changed. For those holding a Spouse Visa, the presence or absence of children is a key element in deterring the new residency status.

=== Divorces involving children ===
When the relationship has produced offspring and the foreign spouse gets custody of the children, then a Long Term Resident Visa (teijuusha) can be applied for, which is renewable indefinitely. To be eligible for this visa, the couple does not actually have to have been legally married, but the Japanese parent must have legally acknowledged their offspring. A child qualifies for Japanese nationality, if at the time of birth either of the parents is a Japanese citizen. In most of these types of divorce cases, the foreign wife gets custody of the children and generally there is little conflict regarding this particular aspect. In those cases where complications do arise on this issue, they often involve the Japanese husband's mother disputing custody. Where there is a legal dispute over the children, Japanese courts tend to almost always rule in favour of the mother when the children are young.

According to a Justice Ministry directive issued on 30 July 1996, foreigners who have custody of their legitimate children with Japanese nationality, and who are actually taking care of the children in Japan, are entitled to receive a Long Term Resident Visa (teijūsha) or Permanent Resident Status (eijūsha). There are virtually no exceptions to this directive. Illegitimate children born to a foreign woman and Japanese father, who is already married, also have a chance of receiving residency status under the 30 July 1996 directive, which allows for a special residency status under these circumstances. In all cases, the Justice Ministry has discretionary power over how soon the visa is granted. At present, the procedure can take one or two years, which causes some mothers severe stress and hardship. The residency status is decided on a case-by-case basis according to the specific circumstances. Generally, the financial situation of the individual is examined and it is determined whether the stated purpose of the visa matches the applicant's situation.

=== Divorce and visa problems involving children ===
Currently, there is a serious gray area in the present legislation with regard to cases where the mother has children from a previous relationship with a non-Japanese national and these children do not have Japanese citizenship. For example, a Chinese woman with two children from a previous relationship with a Chinese partner who marries a Japanese man. She and her children could find themselves deported were she to divorce, if the children had not acquired Japanese nationality. At present, these kinds of cases are the most problematic and likely to increase in number as the Japanese economy becomes more globalized.

=== Divorces involving no children ===
For those holding a Spouse Visa, but having no children, remaining in Japan after the divorce may be much more difficult than for those who have children. After divorcing, those with a Spouse Visa and no children will only be able to stay in Japan until the visa expires. If an individual wishes to remain in Japan after this period, it will be necessary to change the visa status. For example, someone who holds a Spouse Visa and is working as a language instructor might be able to change their status to that of Instructor Visa. A serious problem arises for many foreign women who have only been housewives. Language difficulties often prevent foreign spouses from engaging in paid employment during their initial first few years in Japan. This makes it difficult for them to be self-supporting after a divorce and even harder for them to change their residency status. Divorce for these women often means that they will have to return to their home country, even if they were not at all responsible for the divorce in any way.

== Positive outcomes ==
According to Japan's Ministry of Internal Affairs and Communications Japan's birth rate in 2005 was 1.25. Since the birth rate has been in a steady decline over the last 30 years, some outside force has to increase the population in order for Japanese society to continue to exist in the long term. Immigration has been one of the keys to solving the problem of the low birth rate.

Many scholars such as Kosai, Saito and Yashiro have argued that in order to reverse the declining population trend they must reduce the disparity between the advantages of continuing to work and the costs of childcare for women. There is a danger that the method of reducing the disparity would be by limiting women's career options. However, if there is a sufficient supply of foreign women who are content with the domestic lifestyle and willing to migrate to Japan, this can protect the advancements women have made in the career world. In a very tangible way the industry of importing wives can serve the advancement of women by filling the domestic void left behind by the hard-fought victories of the women's movement in Japan.

Another potential benefit is the financial gains to the woman's family and to her as well. The money paid to the woman's family can be a huge financial boon based upon the humble situations that the women are recruited from. The money paid to the family can vastly improve the lives of those still residing in the wife's native country. In some cases having one less family member to support may be a financial benefit for the woman's family. The woman obviously would have been able to contribute to her family's enterprises, but having one less mouth to feed might make the difference in terms of economic success for some families. The woman's own socio-economic status may be improved by merely marrying "upward"; in rural Japan her new family might have a greater socio-economic status than her own family. There are some very real economic benefits for the participants of the business of wife importation.

The last possible advantage that can be taken from the industry is one of promoting international goodwill for Japan. Anthropologists have long accepted the institution of marriage as a key method of extending kinships and promoting social relations. Japan's reputation with much of the Asian world is still negative because of the atrocities committed by Japan in the first half of the twentieth century. If the experiences of the immigrant wives are good then it is possible for the rest of Asia to begin to view Japan as the peaceful nation that it has become since the end of World War II. Conversely, perhaps the Japanese themselves can take the opportunity to re-evaluate some of their attitudes towards gaijin.

== Problems with foreign marriages ==
- Discrimination in the economic and business world. Not only may obtaining and holding a job be difficult, but career and mobility aspirations may be frustrated for both spouses. Securing the most desired housing often proves hard.
- Social ostracism. The couple may find its former friends and relatives breaking off relations with them, or an element of strain may be introduced into the relationships.
- Personality conflict. This is apparently most important in mixed nationality marriages in which wide differences in background exist. Differences in attitudes, values, and behavior are created which make conflict more likely.

== In popular culture ==
- Kandak Sema, a 2009 novel by Sri Lankan author Sumithra Rahubadde, is about a young Sri Lankan woman from an impoverished family who marries a Japanese farmer to escape poverty. The book was adapted into a 2014 film which also starred Oshin actress, Ayako Kobayashi in a supporting role.

== See also ==
- International marriage (Japan)
