= Senior center =

Community center for senior citizens

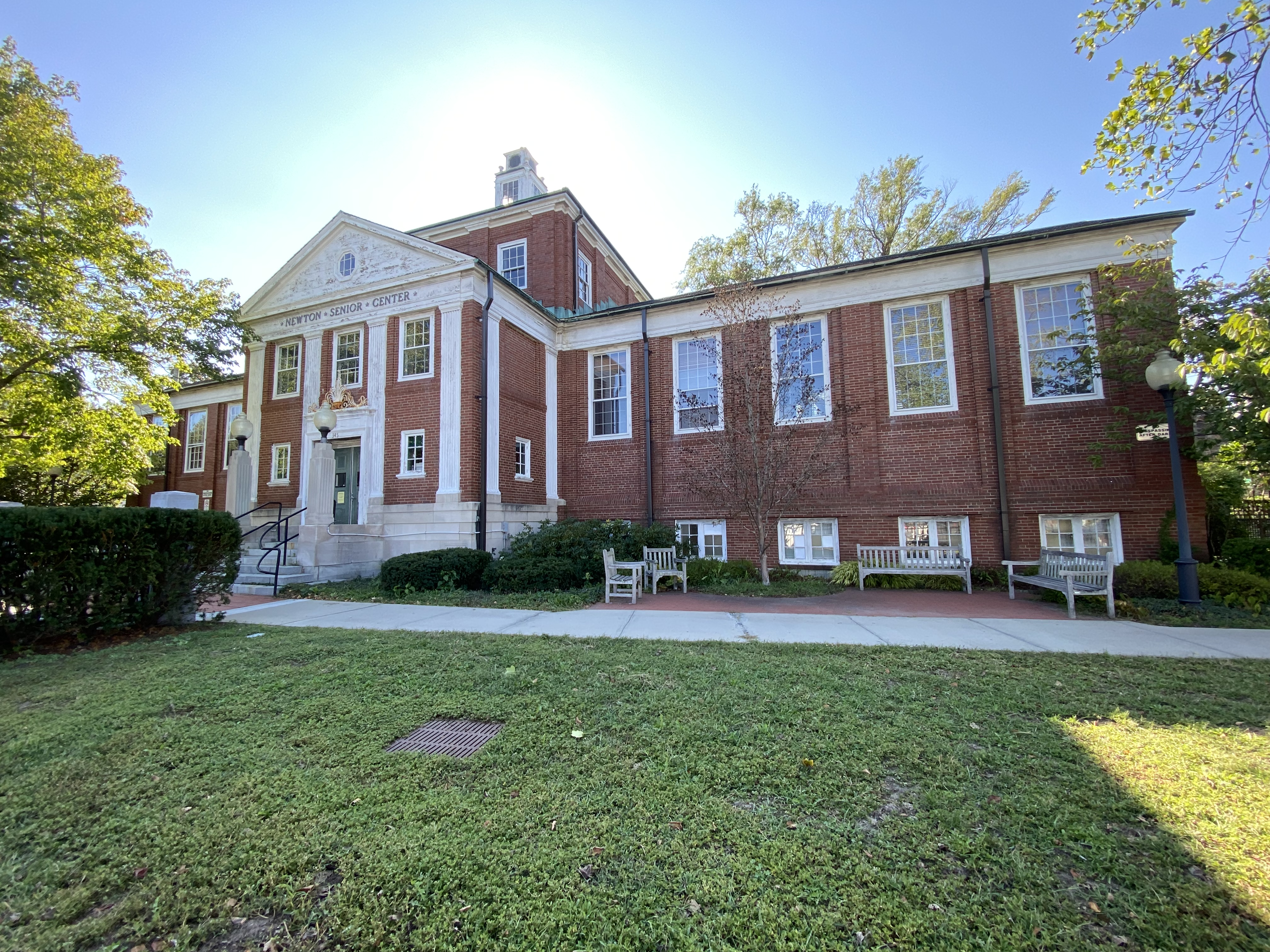
Newton Senior Center in Newton, Massachusetts, a converted public library

A senior center (or senior centre or older adult center) is a type of community center where older adults congregate for fellowship with others to fulfill many of their social, physical, emotional, and intellectual needs. A regular part of senior centers is card and board games, along with video games as that generation moves into old age. Computer services and help, including computer labs and assistance with email, Internet access and tax preparation are also provided by many senior center programs.

Field trips to out-of-town events, venues, recreation, or other pursuits such as casino gambling, are often organized by local senior centers to allow their members to have fun outside their community.

Many centers also serve lunches, providing a critical community need to seniors who are still active and do not need Meals on Wheels service, but have limited financial means to make their own lunches, and prefer companionship while eating.

In the United States, multiple cities and towns have senior centers which receive funding from private, municipal, state, and federal sources.

A senior center may often not go under that title, and often the facility also welcomes younger people, thus being known as a multigenerational center.

== Activities ==
Activities vary by center and are based on the size of the center and funding. Activities can include:

- Dance room
- Game Room
- Computer lab
- Craft room
- Library
- Card room
- Meeting room
- Horseshoe pits
- Exercise room
- Swimming pool
- Lap pool

== Gallery ==
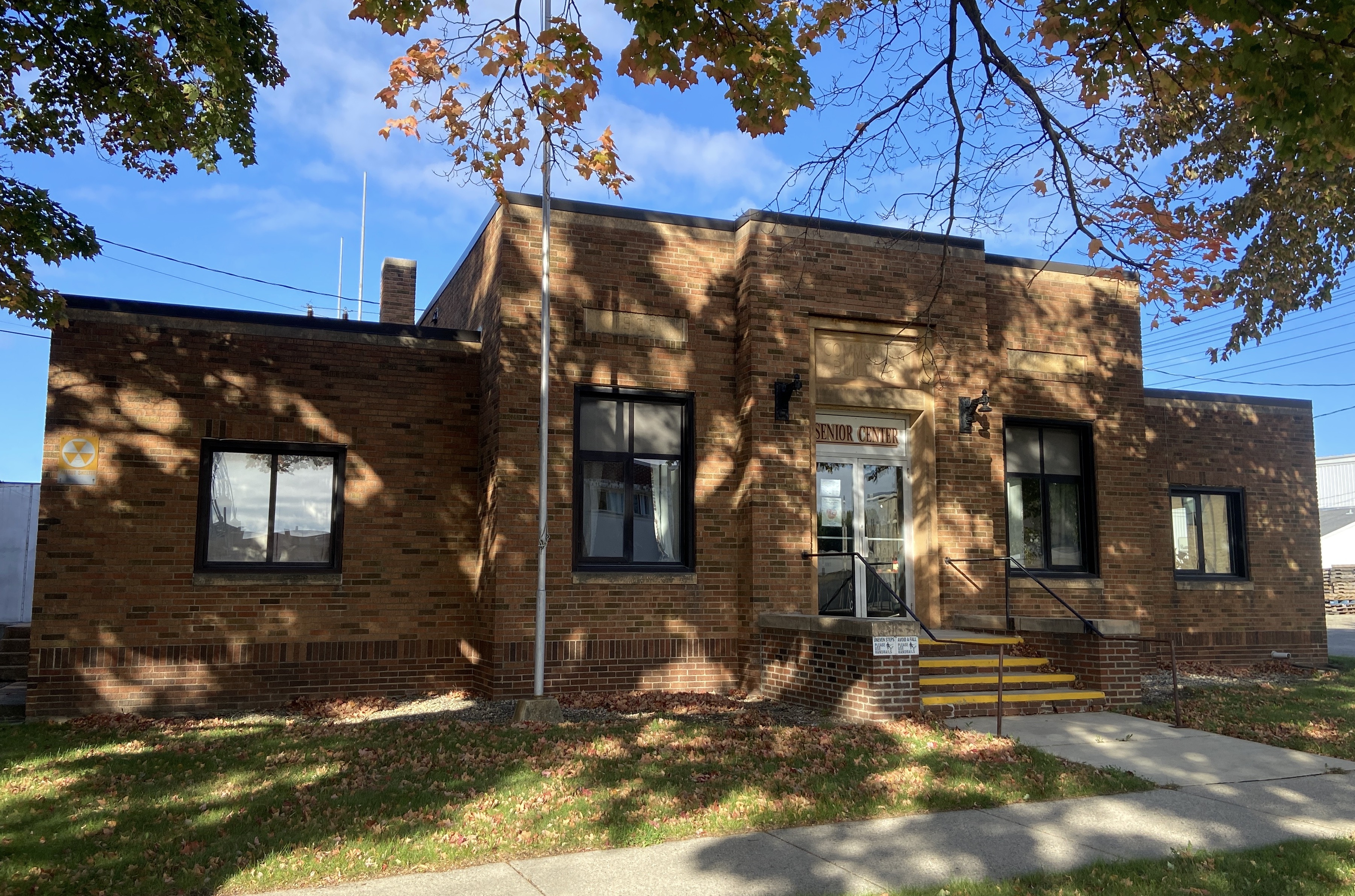
Senior center in Minnesota, the United States

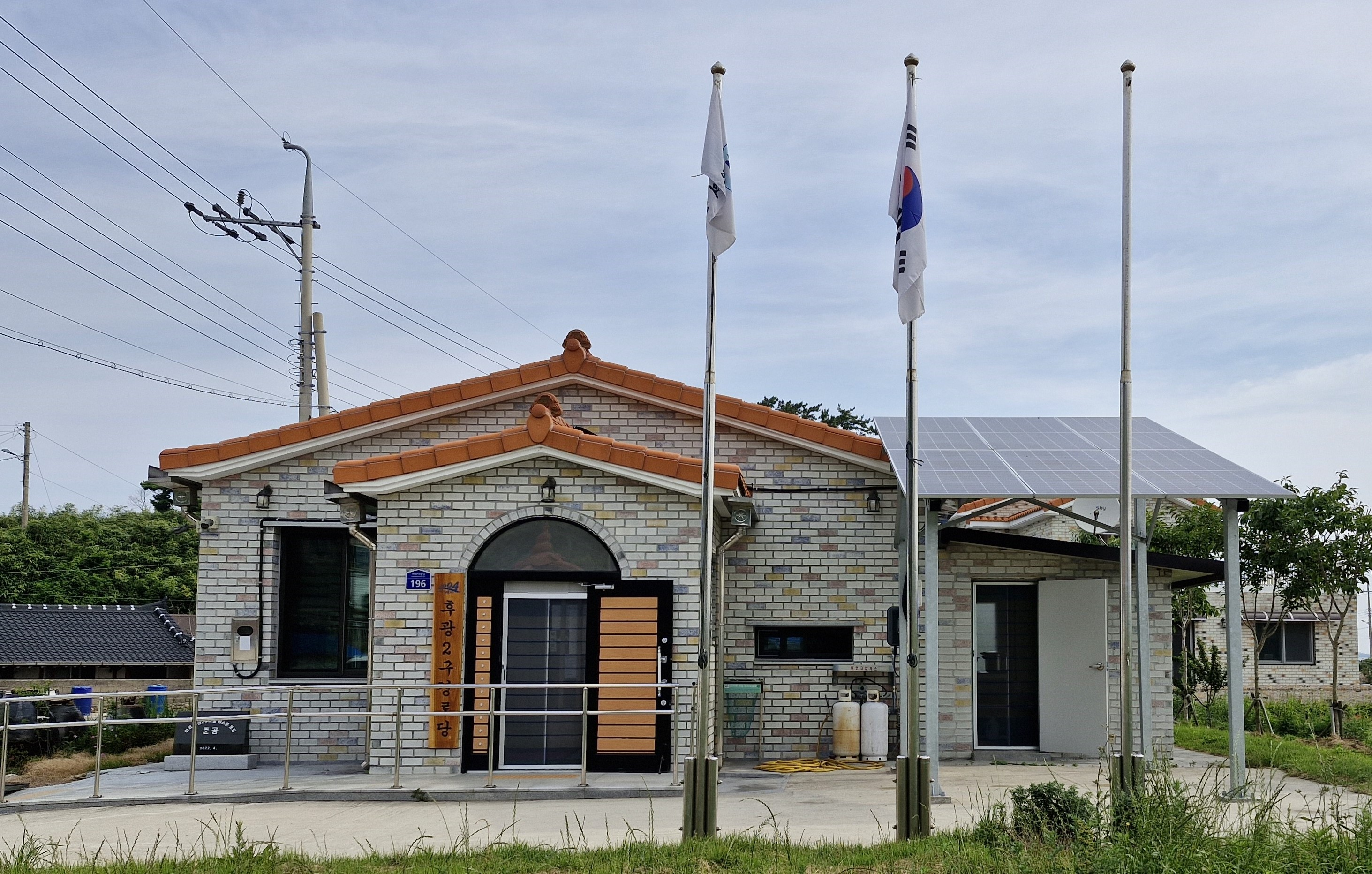
Senior center in Jeollanam-do, South Korea
