= List of UTA Routes =

This is a list of all currently operating Utah Transit Authority bus and rail routes. UTA provides bus and rail service throughout the Wasatch Front region of Utah.

The following is UTA's bus route numbering convention.

- Lines 001-199 are Salt Lake County routes that run east-west
- Lines 200-299 are Salt Lake County routes that run north-south
- Lines 300-399 were Salt Lake County routes designated as “express” routes, meaning they have limited stops
- Lines 400-499 are routes are intercounty, so they go through two or more counties
- Lines 500-599 are Neighborhood routes serving specific neighborhoods
- Lines 600-699 are routes serving just Weber and/or Davis County
- Lines 700-799 are designated for any Rail lines (Light rail, Commuter rail, and Streetcars)
- Lines 800-899 are Utah County routes
- Lines 900-999 are Ski buses and/or seasonal routes in Salt Lake County
- Lines beginning with F are “Flex” routes that normally travel a fixed route, but can deviate up to ¾ mile upon passenger request
- Lines ending in X are Bus Rapid Transit lines (Currently 50X, 603X and 830X)

== Bus Routes ==
As of April 2026, UTA operates three light rail lines, one commuter line, three BRT lines, and approximately 89 regular bus routes.

Regular Service (Includes BRT)
Number	Name	Terminus 1	Terminus 2	Weekday Frequency	Saturday Frequency	Sunday Frequancy
1	South Temple/Rose Park	Poplar Grove (Orange Street Transit Center)	University of Utah Medical Center	15 (30 night)	15 (30 night)	30
2	200 South	Salt Lake Central Station	University of Utah Medical Center	15 (30 night)	15 (30 night)	30
4	400 South/Foothill Drive	Poplar Grove (400 South Redwood Road)	Olympus Cove Park+Ride	30	60	60
9	900 South	Poplar Grove (Orange Street Transit Center)	University of Utah Union Building	15 (7 peak, 30 night)	15 (30 night)	30
17	1700 South	Central Pointe Station	University of Utah Union Building	60		
21	2100 South	Central Pointe Station	University of Utah Union Building	15 (30 night)	15 (30 night)	30
33	3300 South	Milcreek Station	Olympus Cove Park+Ride	15 (30 night)	15 (30 night)	30
35	3500 South	Milcreek Station	Magna	15 (30 night)	15 (30 night)	30
39	3900 South	West Valley Central Station	Olympus Cove Park+Ride	15 (30 night)	30	60
45	4500 South	Murray Central Station	Olympus Cove Park+Ride	30 (60 night)	30 (60 night)	60
47	4700 South	Murray North Station	West Valley Central Station	30 (60 night)	30	60
50X	Midvalley Express	Murray Central Station	West Valley Central Station	15 30 (Early Morning and Night)	15 30 (Early Morning and Night)	30
54	5400 South	Murray Central Station	West Kearns (6200 South 5600 West)	30 (60 night)	30	60
62	6200 South	Fashion Place West Station	West Kearns (6200 South 5600 West)	60	60	
72	7200 South	Midvale Fort Union Station	Cottonwood Corporate Center	30	60	
126	12600 South	Draper Town Center Station	Daybreak Parkway Station	60		
200	State Street (Murray - North Temple)	Murray Central Station	North Temple Station	15 (30 night)	15 (30 night)	30
201	State Street (Murray - South Jordan)	Murray Central Station	South Jordan Station	30	60	
205	500 East	Poplar Grove (400 South Redwood Road)	Murray North Station	30	30	30
209	900 East/ 9th Ave	Salt Lake Central Station	Fashion Place West Station	15 (30 night)	30	60
213	1300 East	Midvale Center Station	University of Utah Union Building	30	60	
217	Redwood Road	West Jordan City Center Station	1940 West North Temple Station	15 (30 night)	15 (30 night)	30
218	Sandy - South Jordan	West Jordan City Center Station	South Jordan Station	30	60	
219	South Redwood Road	Sandy Civic Center Station	Bluffdale	60		
220	Highland Drive - 1100 East	Salt Lake Central Station	Sandy (9400 South Park+Ride)	30 (30-60 night)	30 (30-60 night)	60
223	2300 East - Holladay Blvd	North Temple Station	Cottonwood Corporate Center	60	60	
227	2700 West	Salt Lake Community College Taylorsville-Redwood Campus	Salt Lake Community College Jordan Campus	30	60	
240	4000 West	West Valley Central Station	Jordan Valley Station	30 (30-60 night)	60	60
248	4800 West	West Valley Central Station	4800 West Old Bingam Highway Station	60		
417	Redwood Road Intercounty	1940 West North Temple Station	Woods Cross Station	30		
451	Tooele - Salt Lake	Salt Lake City	Tooele	5 trips am/ 5 trips pm		
455	U of U - Davis County - Weber State University	University of Utah Research Park	Ogden (17th and Wall)	30		
470	Ogden - Salt Lake Intercity	Salt Lake City	Ogden (17th and Wall)	30 (60 night)	30 (60 night)	60
472	Riverdale - Salt Lake EXPRESS	Salt Lake City	Riverdale Park+Ride	3 trips am/ 3 trips pm		
473	Ogden - Salt Lake EXPRESS	University of Utah Research Park	Ogden Central Station	6 trips am/ 6 trips pm		
509	900 West Shuttle	Salt Lake Central Station	West Valley Central Station	30	60	
513	Industrial Business Park Shuttle	Salt Lake Central Station	West Valley Central Station	4 trips am/ 4 trips pm		
551	International Center	LOOP - International Center/1940 West North Templke Station		7 trips am/ 5 trips pm	4 trips am/ 2 trips pm	4 trips am/ 2 trips pm
601	Ogden Trolley	LOOP - Downtown Ogden		20	20	
602	OGX Wildcat Shuttle	Weber State Central	Dee Events Center	10	15	
603X	OGX Ogden Express	Ogden Central Station	Mkay Dee Hospital	10	15	30
604	West Ogden	Ogden Central Station	Roy (5600 South 2200 West)	60	60	
612	Washington Blvd	North Ogden	South Ogden	15 (30 night)	15 (30 night)	30
613	Weber Industrial Park	2700 North Rulton White Blvd	Ogden Central Station	60		
625	ATC - Harrison Blvd - WSU	Ogden-Weber Technical Colledge	South Ogden	60	60	
626	West Roy - Clearfield Station	Clearfield Station	Roy (3500 West 5600 South)	20-60 (60 night)	60	
627	WSU Davis - DTC	Clearfield Station	Fruit Heights Park+Ride	30-90 (60 night)	60	
628	Layton Westside	Clearfield Station	Layton Station	30	60	
630	Birgham City - Ogden Commuter	Ogden Central Station	Brigham City	30-80 (60-110 night)	60	
640	Layton Hills Mall - WSU Ogden Campus	Weber State University Ogden Campus	Layton Hills Mall	30-40	60	
645	Monroe Blvd	Mkay Dee Hospital	Ogden-Weber Technical Colledge	60	30-60	
667	Lagoon/Station Park Shuttle	LOOP - Lagoon/Station Park		15-30	15-30	
805	Santaquin - UVU	Santaquin	Utah Valley University	6 trips am/ 6 trips pm		
806	Eagle Mountain - UVU	Eagle Mountain	Utah Valley University	4 trips am/ 4 trips pm		
807	North County	Lehi Station	Utah Valley University	4 trips am/ 4 trips pm		
821	South County	Provo Central Station	Payson	30 (30-60 night)	60-90	
822	South County LIMITED	Utah Valley University	Payson	4 trips am/ 4 trips pm		
823	Spanish Fork - Springville - Provo Station	Provo Central Station	Spanish Fork	30	60	
830X	UVX Utah Valley Express	Provo Central Station	Orem Central Station	10 (6 peak, 15-30 night)	15 (15-30 night)	
830X	UVX East Bay Loop	LOOP - Provo Central Station/East Bay		20	20	
831	Provo Grandview	Provo Central Station	Orem Central Station	30	60	
833	Provo Airport	Provo Central Station	Provo Airport	60		
834	Riverwoods	Provo Central Station	Vineyard Station	30	60	
850	State Street (Lehi - Provo)	Provo Central Station	Lehi Station	15 (30-60 night)	30 (30-60 night)	60
862	Orem East-West	Orem Central Station	University Place Mall	30	60	
871	Tech Corridor Rail Connector	Lehi Station	Sandy Civic Center Station	60	60	60

Flex Service (Routes are allowed up to two 3/4 mile deviations)
Number	Name	Terminus 1	Terminus 2	Weekday Frequency	Saturday Frequency	Sunday Frequency
F11	11th Ave Flex	University of Utah Medical Center	6th Ave & F Street	60		
F94	Sandy Flex	Sandy (9400 South Park+Ride)	Historic Sandy Station	15-30	60	
F202	Bingam Junction Flex	Fashion Place West Station	South Jordan Station	30		
F232	3200 West Flex	West Valley Central Station	Jordan Valley Station	30		
F453	Tooele - SLC Flex	North Temple Station	Tooele	60		
F514	Jordan Gateway Flex	Sandy Civic Center Station	Draper Station	30	60	
F525	Midvale Flex	Sandy Civic Center Station	Midvale Center Station	30	60	
F556	5600 West Flex	7800 South 5600 West	5600 West Lake Park Blvd	30	60	
F570	7000 South Flex	Midvale Center Station	Jordan Landing	30		
F578	7800 South Flex	Midvale Center Station	7800 South 5600 West	30	60	
F590	9000 South Flex	Historic Sandy Station	SLCC Jordan Campus	30		
F618	Ogden BDO Flex	Ogden Central Station	Ogden BDO	30		
F618	Ogden BDO Flex	Ogden Central Station	Newgate Mall	3 trips morning/2 trips evening		
F620	West Haven Flex	Ogden Central Station	Roy Station	30		
F638	The Brigham City	LOOP - Brigam City		60		

Ski Service (seasonal)
Number	Route	Terminus 1	Terminus 2	Weekday Frequency	Saturday Frequency	Sunday Frequency
674	Powder Mountain - Ogden	Ogden Hotells	Powder Mountain Resort	7 trips am, 8 trips pm	7 trips am, 8 trips pm	7 trips am, 8 trips pm
675	Snowbasin - Ogden	Ogden Central Station	Snowbasin Resort	8 trips am, 9 trips pm	8 trips am, 9 trips pm	8 trips am, 9 trips pm
677	Snowbasin - Layton	Layton Station	Snowbasin Resort	2 trips am, 3 trips pm	2 trips am, 3 trips pm	2 trips am, 3 trips pm
880	Sundance	University Place Mall	Sundance Resort	3 trips am, 5 trips pm	7 trips am, 9 trips pm	
972	Midvale Fort Union to Solitude/Brighton	Midvale Fort Union Station	Solitude/Brighton Resorts	30	30	30
994	Sandy to Snowbird/Alta	Historic Sandy Station	Snowbird/Alta Resorts	30	30	30

== Rail Routes ==
Rail Service
Name	Number	Terminus 1	Terminus 2	Weekday Frequency	Saturday Frequency	Sunday Frequency
Blue Line	701	Salt Lake Central	Draper Town Center	15	15	30
Red Line	703	University Medical Center	Daybreak Parkway	15	15	30
Green Line	704	Salt Lake International Airport	West Valley Central	15	15	30
S-Line	720	Central Pointe	Fairmont	15	15	30
FrontRunner	750	Ogden Central	Provo Central	60 (30 during peak hours)	60	
