= 700 East station =

Streetcar stop in Salt Lake City, Utah, United States

700 East
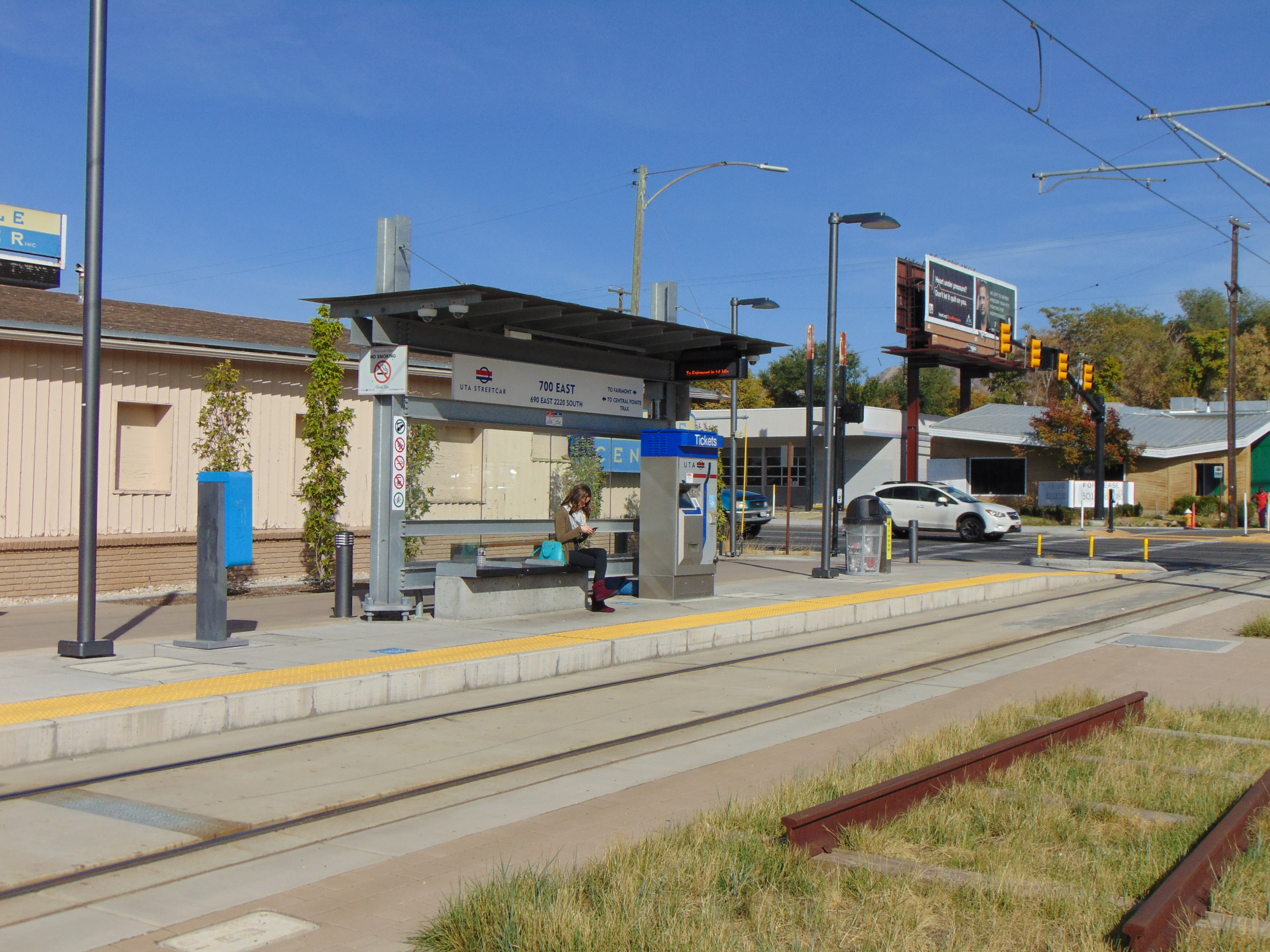
- 700 East platform

General information
- Location: 2210 South 700 East; Salt Lake City, Utah; United States
- Coordinates: 40°43′22″N 111°52′18″W
- Owner: Utah Transit Authority (UTA)
- Platforms: 1 side platform
- Tracks: 1

Construction
- Structure type: At-grade
- Accessible: Yes

History
- Opened: December 8, 2013; 12 years ago

Services
Preceding station	Utah Transit Authority	Following station
500 East toward Central Pointe	S Line	Sugarmont toward Fairmont
Location

700 East is a streetcar stop in the Sugar House neighborhood of Salt Lake City, Utah, in the United States, served by Utah Transit Authority's (UTA) S Line (previously known as the Sugar House Streetcar). The S Line provides service from Sugar House to the city of South Salt Lake (where it connects with UTA's TRAX light rail system).

== Description ==
The 700 East stop is located at 2210 South 700 East, just west of South 700 East (SR-71). The side platform is located on the north side of the single set of tracks. There is no parking available nearby; street-side parking is not permitted along the adjacent section of South 700 East. The stop began service on December 8, 2013, and is operated by Utah Transit Authority.
