= Parley's Trail =

Cycling pathway in Utah, USA

- Length: 8 mi (13 km)
- Trailheads: Bonneville Shoreline Trail; Jordan River Parkway

Parley's Trail is an east-west cycling and pedestrian multi-use pathway in eastern Salt Lake County, Utah, United States.

== Description ==
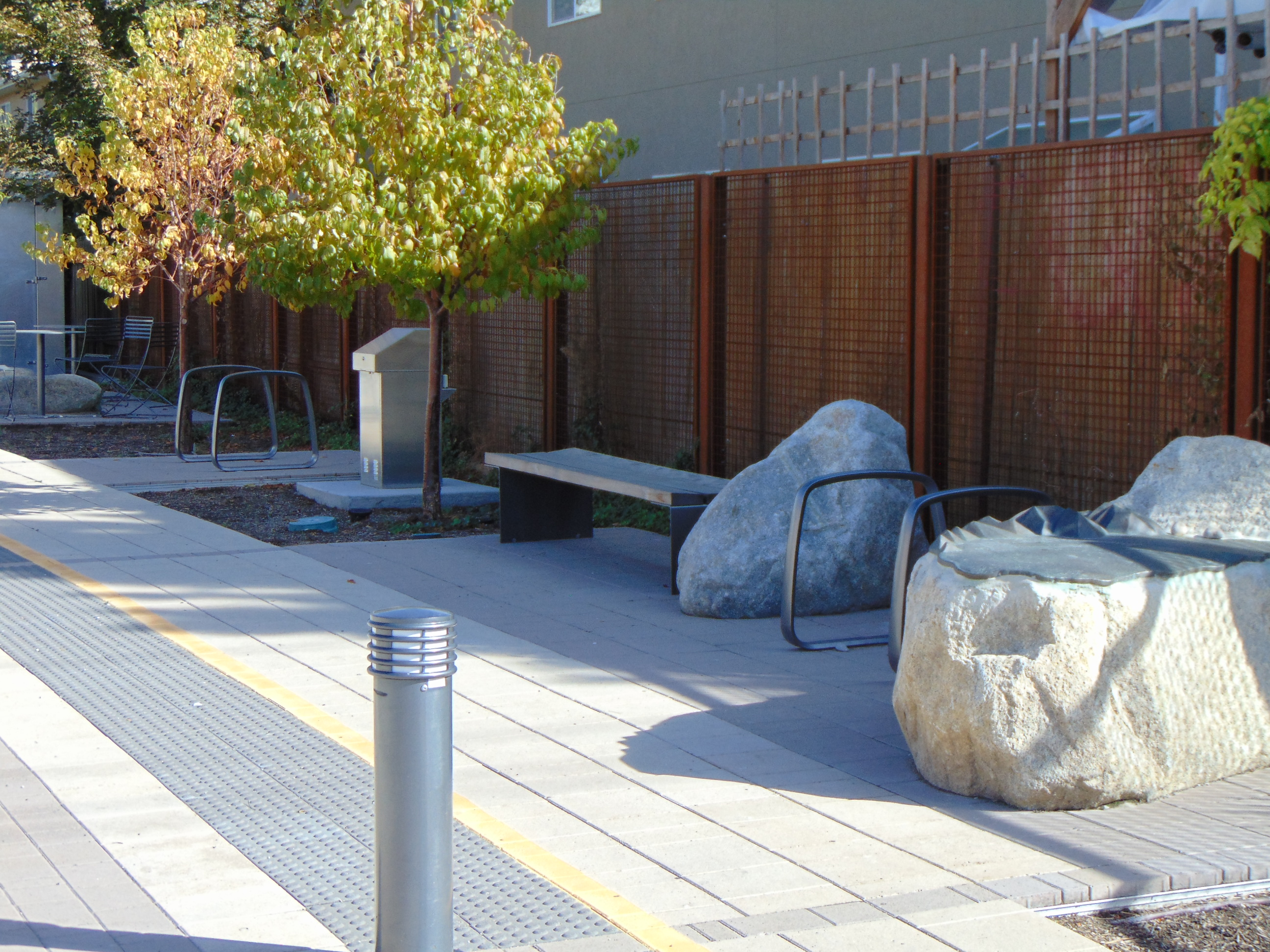
Bench on Parley's Trail in Salt Lake City, October 2016

Parley's trail serves as an east-west multi-use pathway between the Bonneville Shoreline Trail and the Jordan River Parkway. The trail parallels the S Line streetcar though the neighborhoods of South Salt Lake and Sugar House before running along Interstate 80. The trail is 8 miles long, 1.5 miles of which are on roads.

1.2 miles (1.9 km) of separation including bridge and tunnel work is actively being conducted by the Utah Department of Transportation with an expected finish of summer of 2017. In gaps where the path isn't fully separated from cars, the trail has been temporarily routed on sidewalks and on-street bike lanes. Maps and updates on the project can be found on the Parley's Trail Alliance website.

== See also ==
- Parley's Canyon
- Cycling infrastructure
- Sugar House Park
