= 500 East station =

Streetcar stop in South Salt Lake, Utah, United States

500 East
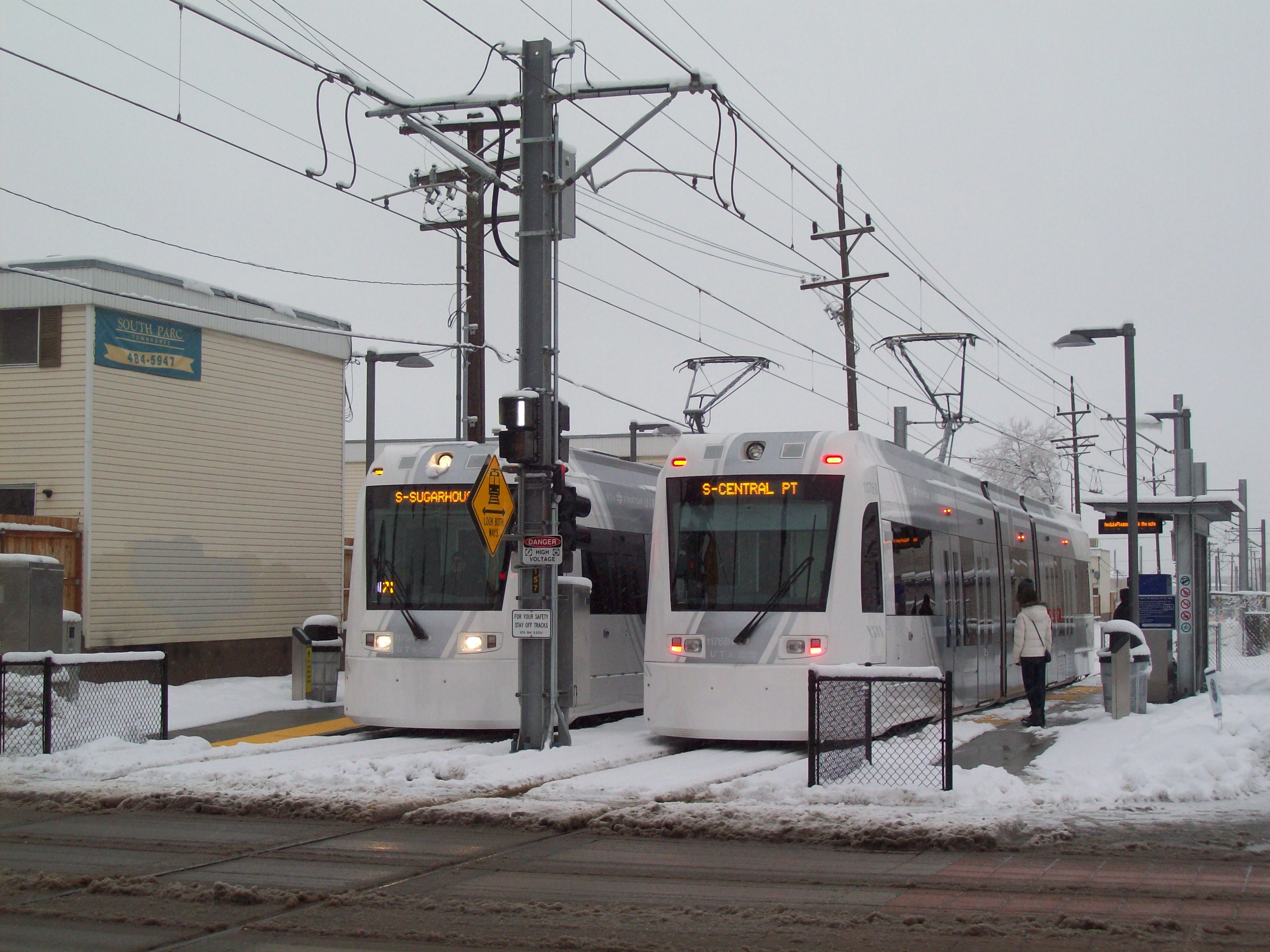
- Two streetcars stopped at the 500 East platforms

General information
- Location: 2234 South 500 East; South Salt Lake, Utah; United States
- Coordinates: 40°43′20″N 111°52′37″W
- Owner: Utah Transit Authority (UTA)
- Platforms: 2 side platforms
- Tracks: 2
- Connections: UTA: 205

Construction
- Structure type: At-grade
- Accessible: Yes

History
- Opened: December 8, 2013; 12 years ago

Services
Preceding station	Utah Transit Authority	Following station
300 East toward Central Pointe	S Line	700 East toward Fairmont
Location

500 East is a streetcar stop in South Salt Lake, Utah, served by Utah Transit Authority's (UTA) S Line (previously known as the Sugar House Streetcar). The S Line provides service from the Sugar House neighborhood of Salt Lake City to the city of South Salt Lake (where it connects with UTA's TRAX light rail system).

== Description ==
The 500 East stop is located at 2234 South 500 East, just west of South 500 East. The single set of tracks diverges to form a passing track at this stop, thus permitting (as planned in its schedule) two cars to stop at the stop at the same time. (The two tracks continue east across 500 East before merging back to a single set.) The two side platforms are located on the far north and south sides of the tracks. There is very limited street-side parking possible nearby. The stop began service on December 8, 2013, and is operated by Utah Transit Authority.
