= 300 East station =

Streetcar stop in South Salt Lake, Utah, United States

300 East
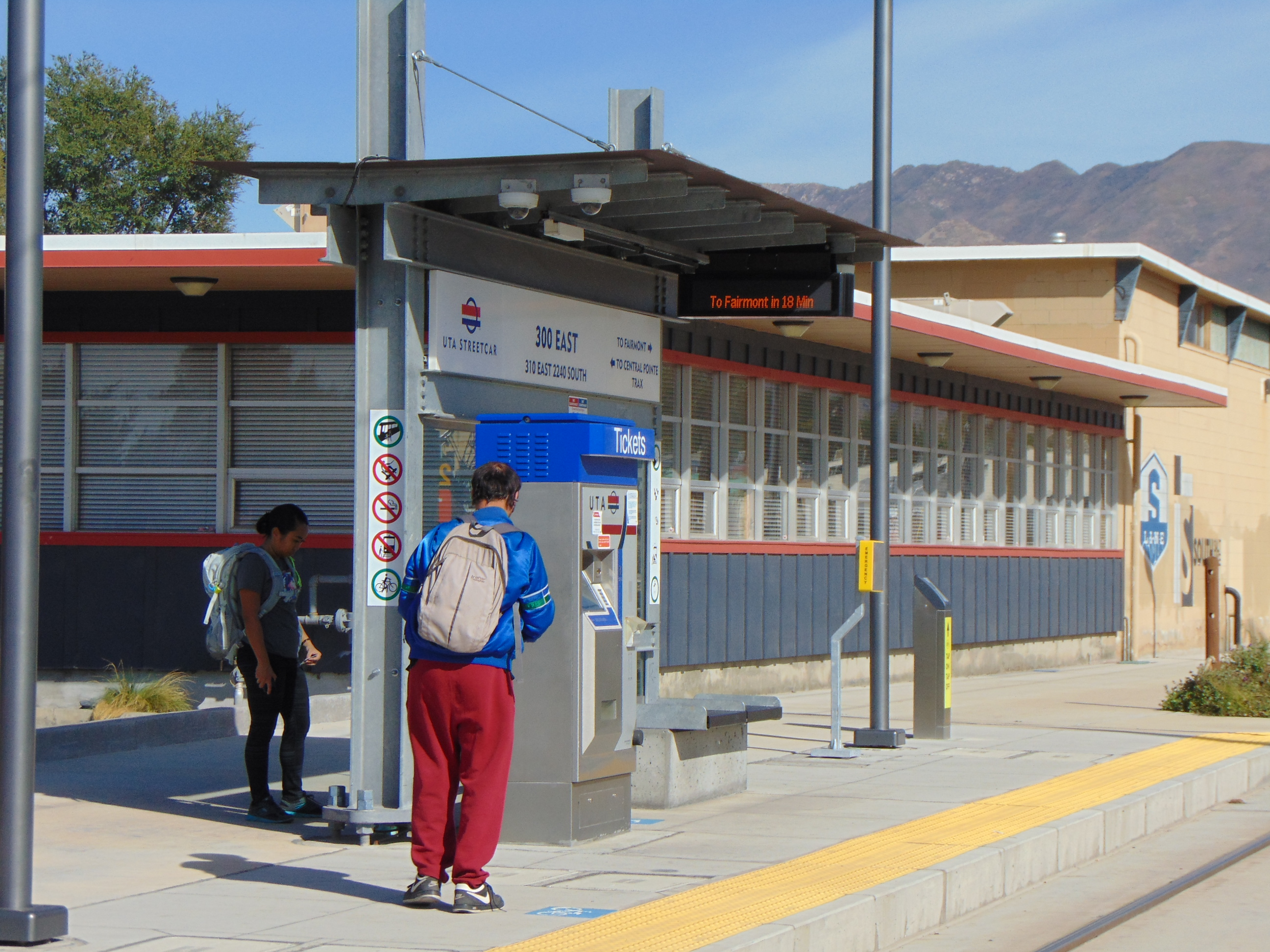
- 300 East platform

General information
- Location: 2240 South 300 East; South Salt Lake, Utah; United States
- Coordinates: 40°43′20″N 111°52′56″W
- Owner: Utah Transit Authority (UTA)
- Platforms: 2 side platforms
- Tracks: 2

Construction
- Structure type: At-grade
- Accessible: Yes

History
- Opened: December 8, 2013; 12 years ago
- Rebuilt: June 2018–April 2019; 7 years ago

Services
Preceding station	Utah Transit Authority	Following station
South Salt Lake toward Central Pointe	S Line	500 East toward Fairmont
Location

300 East is a streetcar stop in South Salt Lake, Utah, served by Utah Transit Authority's (UTA) S Line (previously known as the Sugar House Streetcar). The S Line provides service from the Sugar House neighborhood of Salt Lake City to the city of South Salt Lake (where it connects with UTA's TRAX light rail system).

== Description ==
The 300 East stop is located at 2240 South 300 East, immediately east of South 300 East. The two side platforms are located on the far north and south sides of the tracks. There is very limited street-side parking possible nearby. The stop began service on December 8, 2013, and is operated by Utah Transit Authority.

When the S Line opened in December 2013, the line was almost entirely single-tracked, with passing tracks at the 500 East stop where the two cars typically operating on the line could pass each other. This layout enabled 20 minute frequencies on the line. In June 2017 it was announced that Salt Lake County would provide $4.5 million, and the federal government would provide $1.9 million through its Congestion Mitigation and Air Quality Improvement program, to double-track the portion of the S Line from just west of the 300 East stop, through to just east of the 500 East stop, enabling improved 15 minute frequencies on the line. Construction began in June 2018, and was completed in April 2019.
