= South Salt Lake City station =

South Salt Lake City
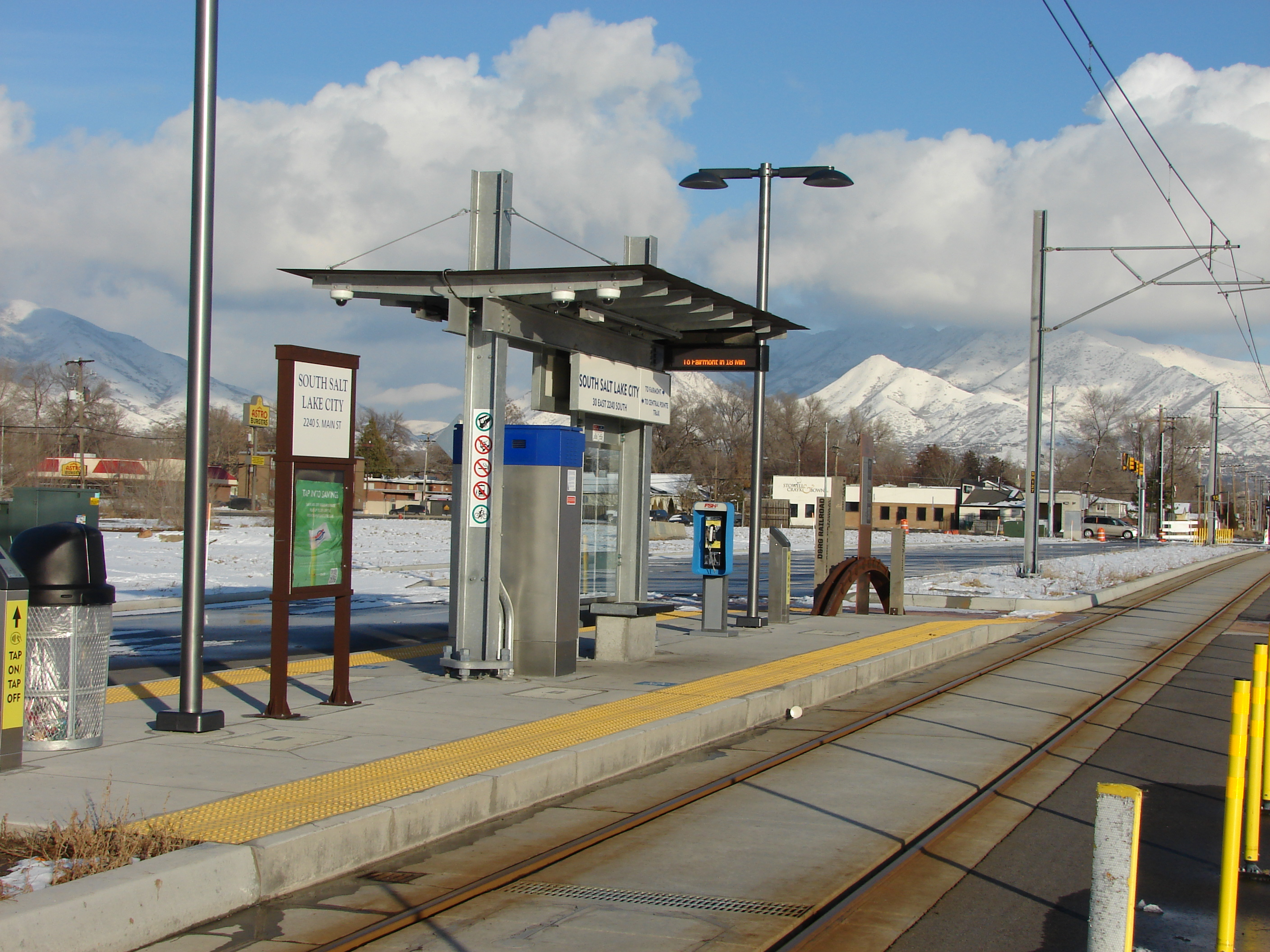
- South Salt Lake City platform

General information
- Location: 2240 South Main Street; South Salt Lake, Utah; United States
- Coordinates: 40°43′20″N 111°53′24″W
- Owner: Utah Transit Authority (UTA)
- Platforms: 1 island platform
- Tracks: 1
- Connections: UTA: 200

Construction
- Structure type: At-grade
- Accessible: Yes

History
- Opened: December 8, 2013; 12 years ago
- Former names: State Street

Services
| Preceding station | Utah Transit Authority | Following station |
|---|---|---|
| Central Pointe Terminus | S Line | 300 East toward Fairmont |
Location

South Salt Lake City (Note: While the official and proper name of the city in which it is located is "South Salt Lake", the official and proper name of the streetcar stop in the median of Central Pointe Place is "South Salt Lake City". In the initial planning stages of what was then known as the Sugar House Streetcar, the stop was referred to as State Street.) is a streetcar stop in South Salt Lake, Utah, in the United States, served by Utah Transit Authority's (UTA) S Line (previously known as the Sugar House Streetcar). The S Line provides service from the Sugar House neighborhood of Salt Lake City to the city of South Salt Lake (where it connects with UTA's TRAX light rail system).

== Description ==
The South Salt Lake City stop is located at about 30 East in the median of a newly created street called Central Pointe Place, which runs east-west at about 2200 South; however the official address of the stop is 2240 South Main Street. (Although this stop is located it the median of Central Pointe Place, it should not be confused with the Central Pointe station.) The island platform is located on the north side of the existing single set of tracks. The stop is easily accessible from both Main Street and State Street (US-89). There is limited angle parking available along a portion of both sides of Central Pointe Place. (As of early February 2014, the Central Pointe Place street was still not open to vehicular traffic.) The passenger platform includes a memorial to the history of the area. The stop began service on December 8, 2013, and is operated by Utah Transit Authority.
