= S Line (Utah Transit Authority) =

Streetcar line in Salt Lake County, Utah, United States

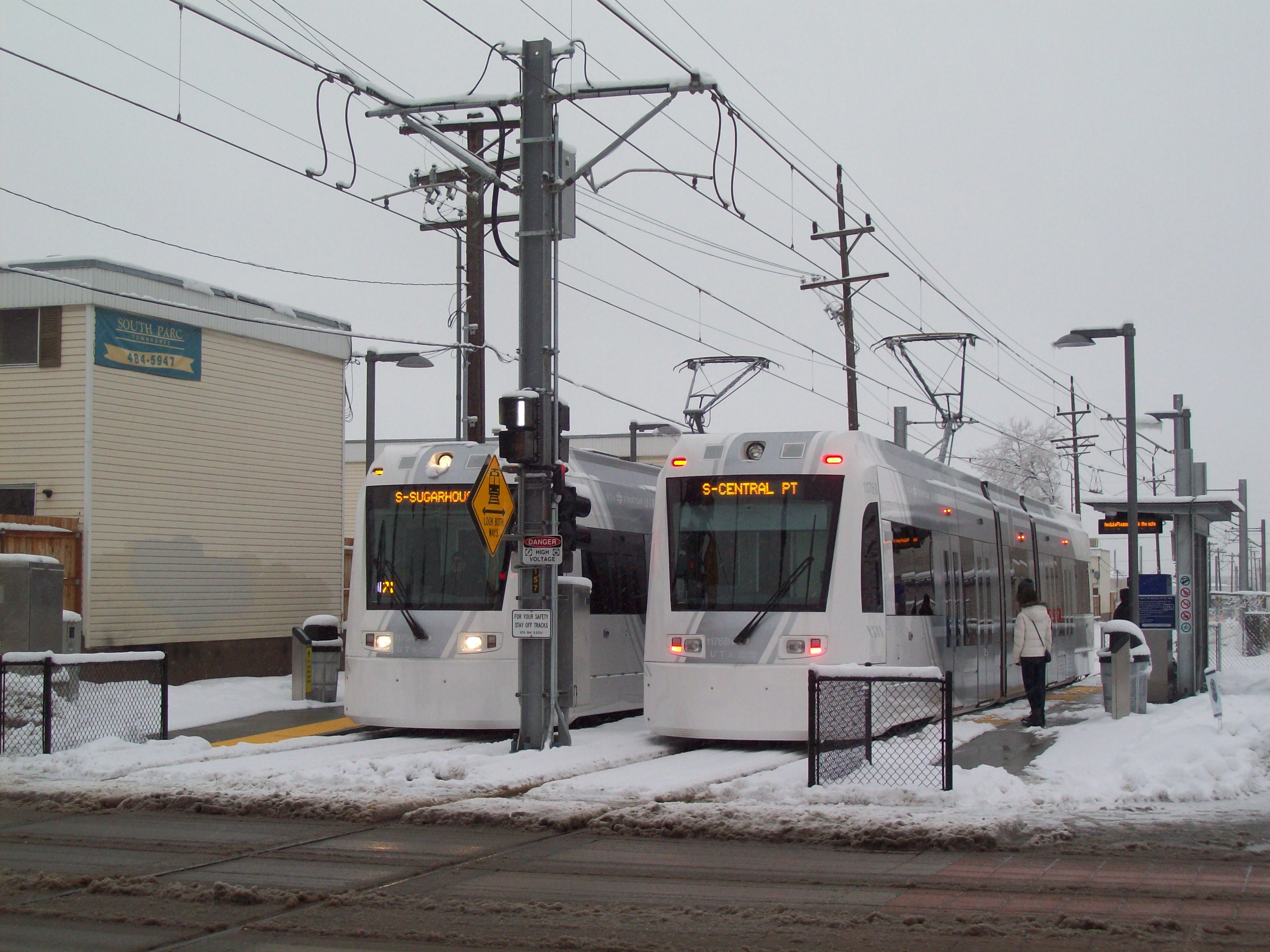
- West at two S Line streetcars at 500 East station, December 2013

Overview
- Other name: Sugar House Streetcar
- Owner: Utah Transit Authority (UTA)
- Locale: Salt Lake City & South Salt Lake, Utah, United States
- Termini: Central Pointe station; Fairmont
- Stations: 7

Service
- Type: Streetcar
- Route number: 720
- Rolling stock: Siemens S70 US
- Daily ridership: 1,246 daily (2024)

History
- Opened: December 8, 2013

Technical
- Line length: 2 mi (3.22 km)
- Track length: 2.74 mi (4.41 km)
- Num of tracks: 1, with passing tracks
- Track gauge: 4 ft 8 1/2 in (1,435 mm) standard gauge
- Electrification: Overhead line, 750 V DC
- Operating speed: 25 mph (40 km/h)

The S Line, or S-Line (formerly known as Sugar House Streetcar), is a public transit streetcar line in northeastern Salt Lake County, Utah, in the United States, that connects the business district of the Sugar House neighborhood of Salt Lake City with the neighboring city of South Salt Lake, as well as the Utah Transit Authority's (UTA) TRAX light rail system. It is a joint project between UTA, Salt Lake City, and South Salt Lake. It opened for service on December 8, 2013. It is operated by UTA and is UTA's first streetcar line.

== Description ==
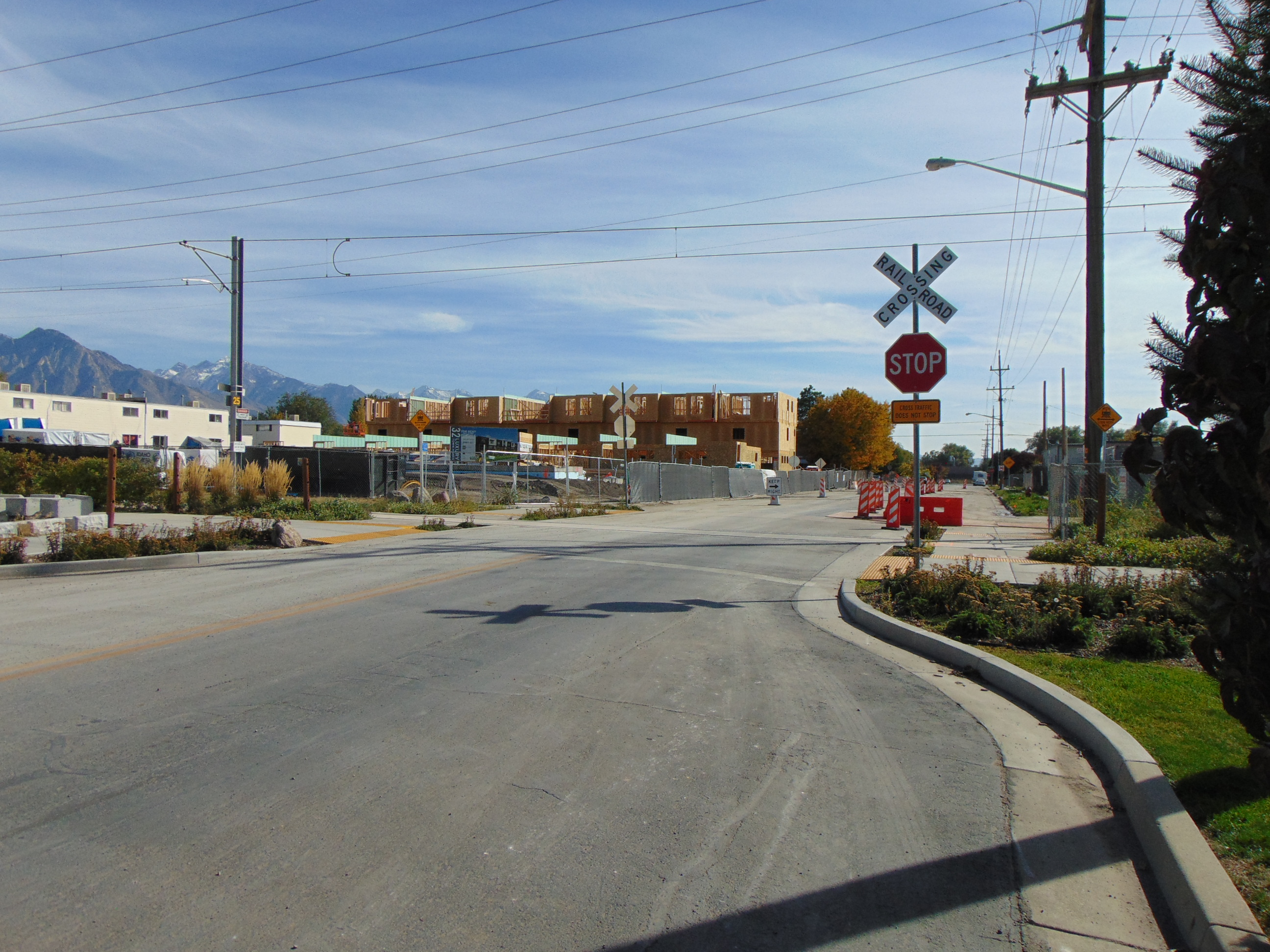
S Line level crossing at South 400 East in South Salt Lake, October 2016

While fairly similar to UTA's TRAX light rail (Note: The distinction between the terms streetcar (or tram) and light rail is often blurred and the Wikipedia articles on both terms provide substantial discussion on the matter. In the United States, streetcars are included in (but mostly considered a subcategory of) what is referred to as light rail. However, light rail is distinguished from the term commuter rail.) the S Line operates at a substantially slower speed, with a top speed of 25 miles per hour (40 km/h). The S Line also differs from TRAX in that it has frequent stops for easy pedestrian access. Other differences are that the S Line operates with a single vehicle, rather than a "train" of vehicle. Because of its slower speed, most S-line at-grade road crossings do not have barrier arms that stop vehicular traffic. Instead, many streetcar crossings have traffic lights, while several are controlled by stop signs. Accordingly, the streetcars may be required to slow down or even stop prior to crossing roadways. (These road crossings also include crosswalks that parallel the tracks, and pedestrian traffic lights as well.) The fare for the S Line is the same as for TRAX and the same methods of payment (including the Farepay card) are accepted.

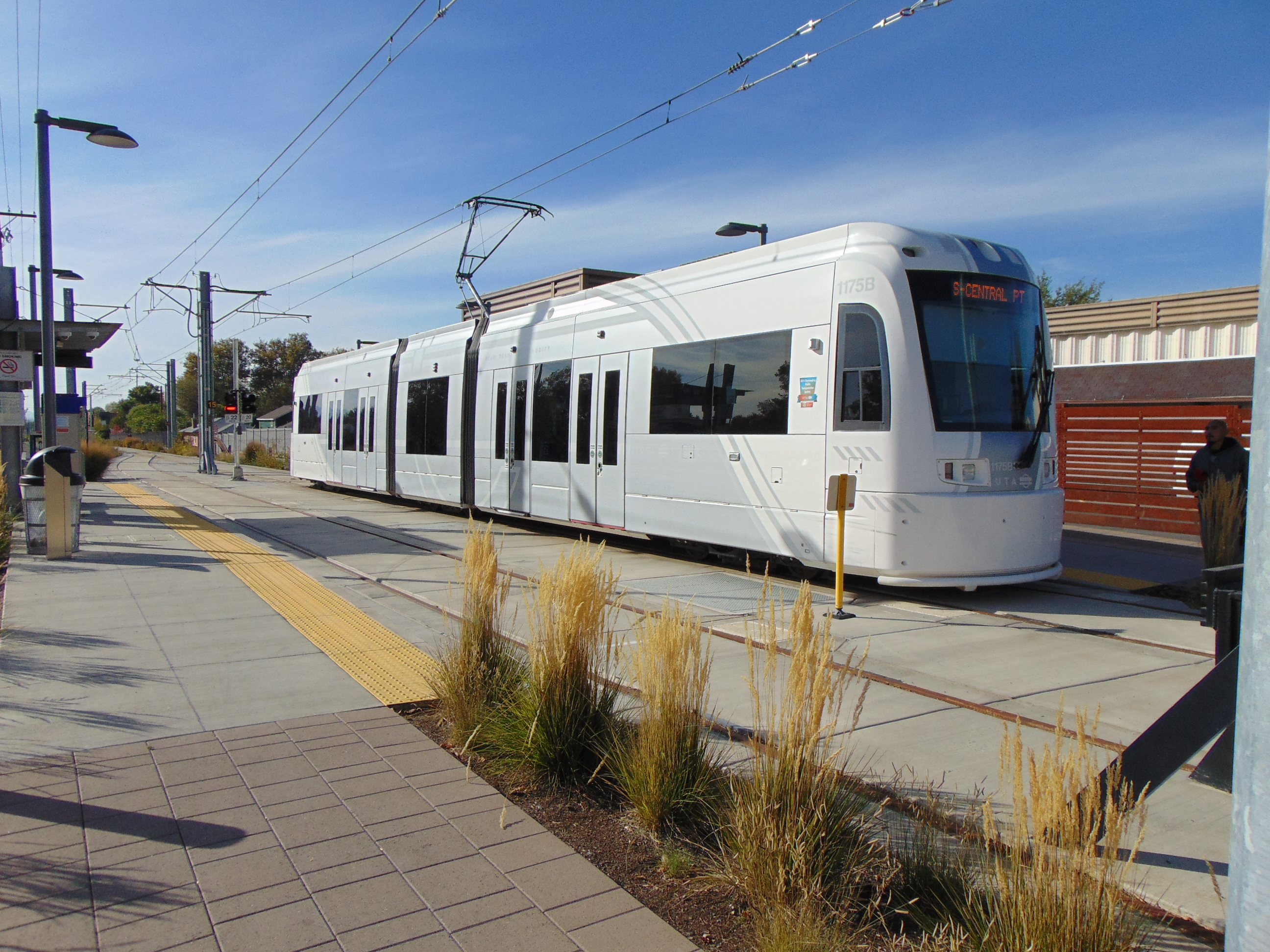
Siemens S70 S Line streetcar at the westbound stop of Fairmont station, October 2016

The S Line utilizes the same Siemens S70 US cars used by the TRAX Red and Green lines. The decision to use the same car model resulted in substantial savings as it allows UTA to use the same maintenance facilities used for TRAX. However, Mayor Becker suggested that as the S Line evolves (Phase 2 and beyond) the cars used could move "toward a more traditional streetcar design". The cars used for the S Line have a silver and white color scheme, as opposed the red, white, and blue color scheme used by the rest of UTA's vehicles (buses, TRAX trains, and the FrontRunner train). Since the S Line is intended for shorter trips than TRAX it has more standing room and space for bicycles. Each car has a capacity of 60 people. Daily ridership was anticipated to be initially about 2,000 by the year 2030. According to UTA, actual average weekday ridership stands at 1,335 per day.

Most of the corridor for Phase 1 of the S Line includes a linear park. It also parallels a portion of Parley's Trail (which connects the Jordan River Parkway with the Bonneville Shoreline Trail and Parley's Canyon).

== History ==
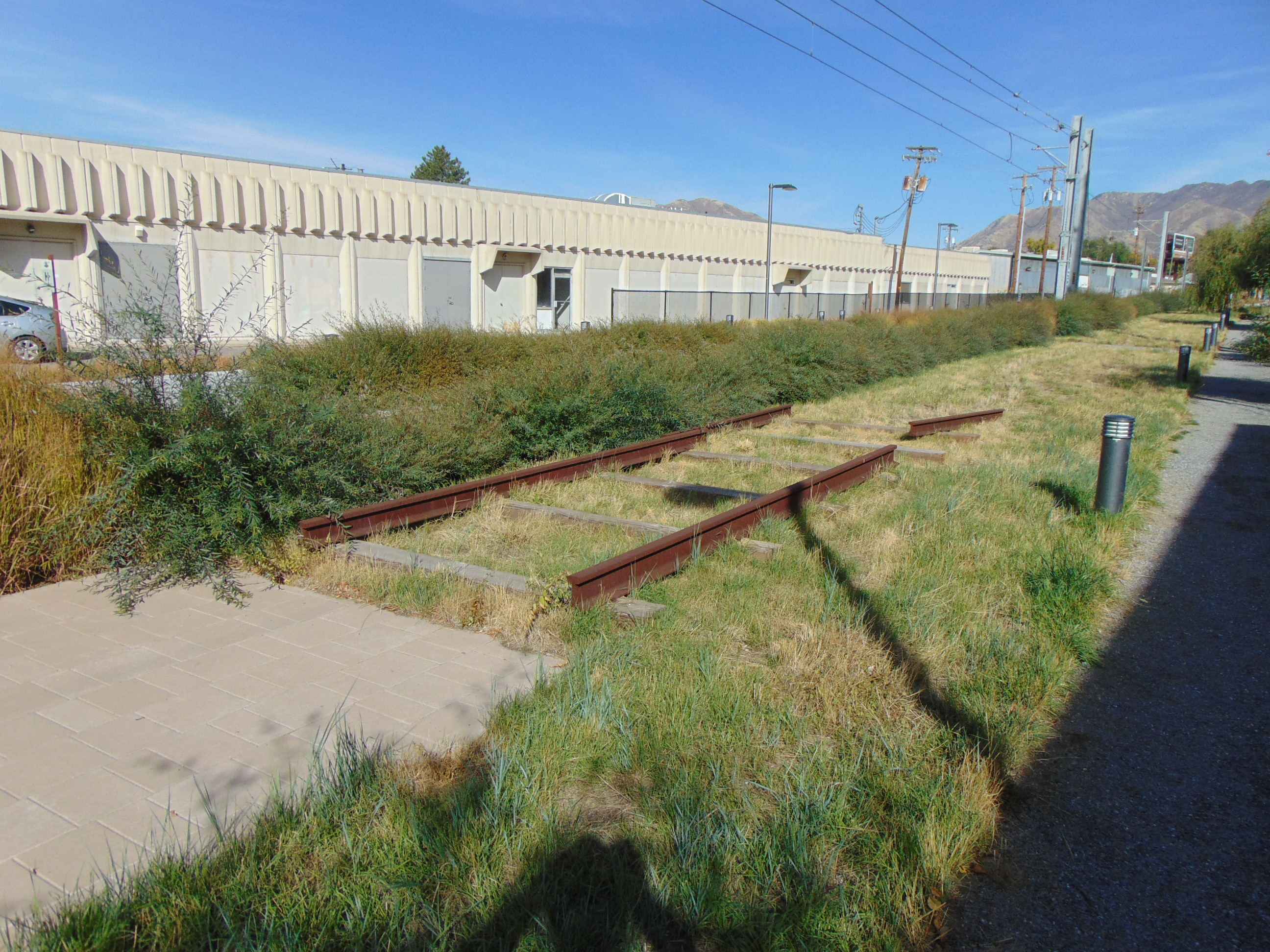
Rail tracks for the former Sugar House Branch that were kept along Parley's Trail, October 2016

The rail line right-of-way used for the first operational section (Phase 1) of the S Line was originally built in 1900 by the Denver and Rio Grande Western Railroad (D&RGW) as the Sugar House Branch. Southern Pacific purchased the D&RGW properties, which in turn folded into the Union Pacific Railroad (UP). UTA purchased the right-of-way and the rail line in 2002 and UP officially abandoned the rail line in 2005.

Federal funding for the project was applied for in 2009. Of the estimated $55 million project cost, Salt Lake City provided $2.5 million in funding and applied for $35 million in federal Transportation Investment Generating Economic Recovery (TIGER) funding. The project was granted $26 million TIGER II funding on October 20, 2010. Construction began on May 9, 2012.

In late August 2013, UTA announced that the streetcar would be called the S Line According to UTA, "The S Line was named in honor of the streetcar's two founding cities, Salt Lake and South Salt Lake, as well as the Sugar House neighborhood it calls home." Salt Lake City Mayor Ralph Becker stated, "The name both unites the communities, but also the corridor."

The line opened for regular service on December 8, 2013, but free rides were offered the day prior (with a food donation).

Phase 1 of the S Line runs along the old D&RGW line (which lies between 2100 South and I-80) from the Central Pointe TRAX station in South Salt Lake to the commercial district of the Sugar House neighborhood of Salt Lake City near Highland Drive (specifically the site of the old Granite Furniture Building or "Granite Block"). The streetcar plan was developed from an earlier proposal for a heritage trolley line which was begun in 2002. The original idea was reported in the Deseret News on May 16, 2003. However, at that time rail service was not projected to reach Sugar House before the year 2030.

Since most of Phase 1 was built within the existing railway right-of-way, very minimal additional property acquisition was necessary. The integration of the S Line at Central Pointe station required the addition of a second passenger platform (a side platform) to be built just southeast of the existing island platform for the TRAX lines. Transfer between the two modes of transportation only requires a short walk between the two platforms, but the S Line platform is only accessible from the southern end of the TRAX platform.

Although years in development, the S Line is the first streetcar line to operate in the state of Utah in over 50 years. The initial length of the S Line (Phase 1) was about 2 miles (3.2 km). A two-block section of the S Line, between 300 and 500 East, was double-tracked in early 2019 at a cost of $5.9 million to address frequency needs spurred by growing ridership.

=== Double-tracking ===
When the S Line opened in December 2013, the line was almost entirely single-tracked, with passing tracks at the 500 East station where the two cars typically operating on the line could pass each other. This layout enabled 20 minute frequencies on the line. In June 2017 it was announced that Salt Lake County would provide $4.5 million, and the federal government would provide $1.9 million through its Congestion Mitigation and Air Quality Improvement program, to double-track the portion of the S Line from just west of the 300 East station, through to just east of the 500 East station, enabling improved 15 minute frequencies on the line. Construction began in June 2018, and was completed in April 2019.

== Future plans ==
=== S-Line Extension Project ===
In November 2023, UTA announced that construction on a 1,000-foot (300 m) extension to a new station on Simpson Avenue and Highland Drive. Alongside the extension, double tracking from the 500 East station would be extended to just before the 700 East station. Construction began in June of 2026, with service beginning around Summer 2027.

=== Future Extensions ===
The S Line was planned to be constructed in two phases. As part of a Phase 2, the S Line would extend beyond the Fairmont station . There were six different alignments considered, however the route for the further extension has been nearly finalized. The Phase 2 extension has the S Line continuing east from the Fairmont station to Highland Drive, then heading north (as Highland Drive becomes 1100 East) and ending immediately south of 1700 South. This route would provide service to Westminster College. Although there was substantial opposition to this recommended route for Phase 2, the objections were not focused on the initial section of Phase 2 along Highland Drive, but rather the section further north. Many are opposed the route continuing north along 1100 East and would rather see the streetcar continue east along 2100 South. Notwithstanding, city leaders have repeatedly indicated that many of the objections arise because of a lack of understanding regarding the differences between the S Line (streetcar) and TRAX (light rail). There still remains the possibility of further extensions beyond Phase 2, but none have yet to be specifically identified for official discussion.

== Route ==
The S Line is designated as UTA Route 720.

=== South Salt Lake ===
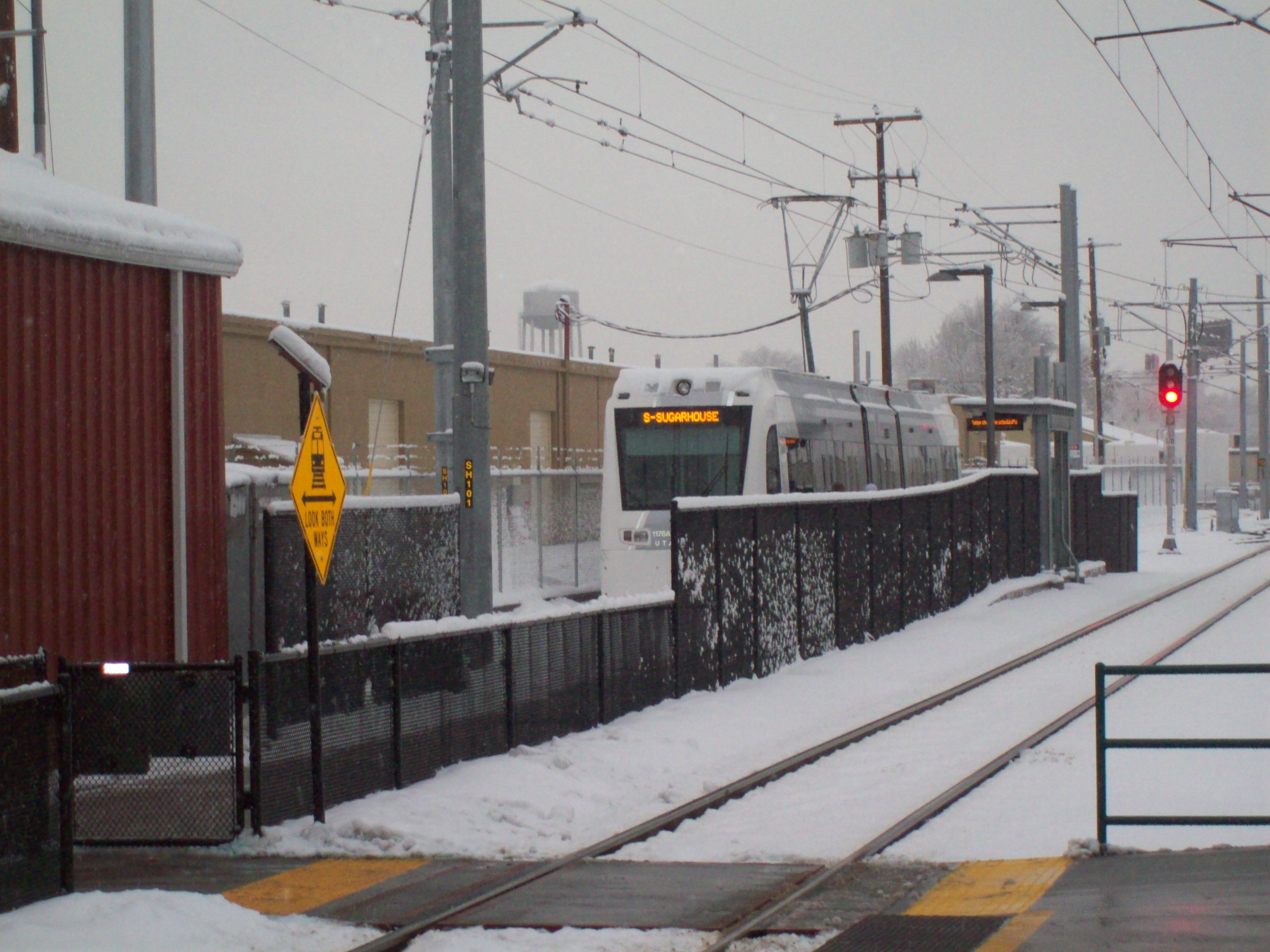
Central Pointe station, the western end of the S Line, December 2013

The S Line begins at the Central Pointe station, the streetcar portion of which is located at 193 West Utopia Avenue in the city of South Salt Lake, just south of (SR-201). (Central Pointe is also the southernmost station served by all three TRAX lines: Blue, Red, and Green). From this station the S Line heads south along the east side of the TRAX right-of-way until it turns east along the former D&RGW right-of-way at about 2230 South. (While the S Line heads east along this right-of-way, the TRAX Green Line heads west along the same right-of-way towards West Valley City). With industrial buildings on both sides of the track, the streetcar continues east to cross West Temple. At West Temple, Parley's Trail begins running along the north side of the S Line for the remainder of the route. After crossing South Main Street, it runs down the median of a new east–west street (called Central Pointe Place) quickly reaching the South Salt Lake City station at 2240 South Main Street. After that stop it continues east in the median until it reaches the east end of Central Pointe Place and then crosses South State Street (US 89). (Note: While much of the S Line route is a still a single set of tracks, UTA has provided few clues regarding possible future intentions to add additional sets of tracks. The first is that the South Salt Lake City station is an island platform, even though there is initially only one set of tracks running along the median of Central Pointe Place. There is, however, ample room to install a second set of tracks on the other (north) side of the island platform and still leave a lane for westbound vehicular traffic. However, a greater clue is that when the tracks were installed across State Street (US 89), the busiest roadway that the S Line crosses, a second set of tracks were installed as well. These secondary tracks are north of the existing line and, while these tracks are in line with where any tracks that would run along the north side of the South Salt Lake City station platform would connect, the secondary tracks only extend to just beyond the edges of the State Street right-of-way and do not connect to anything, yet. Furthermore, there is sufficient space along most, if not all, of the Phase 1 section to add a second set of tracks and additional passenger platforms, as necessary.) East of South State Street the S Line begins a stretch with residential housing on the north side of the tracks instead of industrial buildings. After crossing South 200 East, but before South 300 East, the Line expands to double tracks. Immediately after crossing South 300 East, the S Line arrives at the 300 East station at 2240 South 300 East. With industrial buildings once again to the north, the streetcar continues east, crossing South 400 East (the first of only three roads, other than the two alleyways, crossings where vehicle traffic is only controlled by stop signs rather than traffic lights). Past South 00 East the S Line arrives at the 500 East station at 2234 South 500 East.

=== Sugar House (Salt Lake City) ===
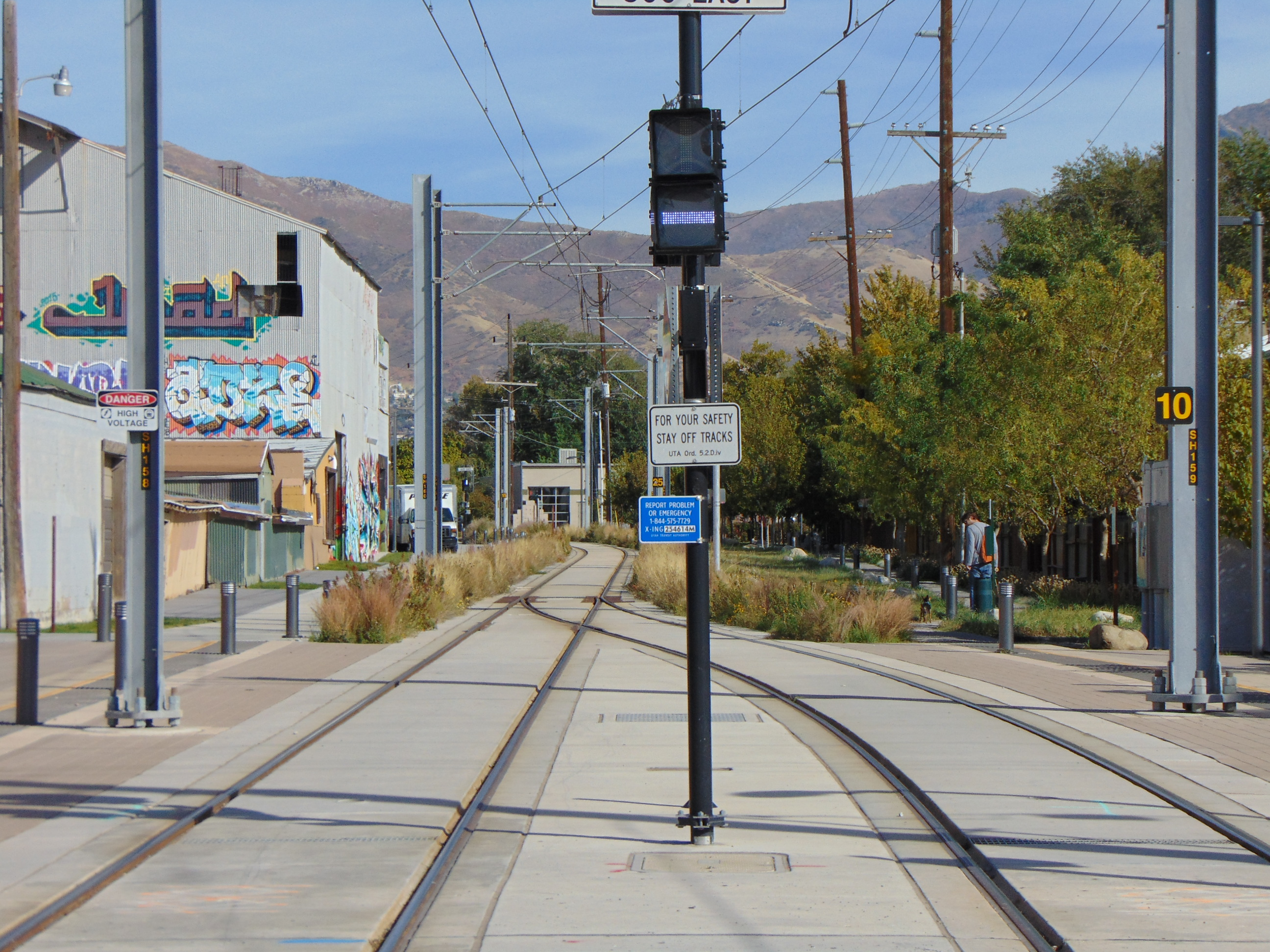
East along the S Line tracks east of South 500 East in Salt Lake City, October 2016

After crossing South 500 East, the streetcar leaves South Salt Lake and enters the Sugar House neighborhood of Salt Lake City. The two S Line tracks then merge back to a single set. Continuing east, but now slightly to the north, it crosses South 600 East and arrives at the 700 East station at 2210 South 700 East. From that stop the tracks continue due east once again (at about 2210 South) and cross South 700 East (SR-71). East of South 700 East the route briefly follows along a former roadway (Sequoia Ruby Court), including an alleyway crossing, before reaching Lake Street (740 East). After crossing Lake Street, the streetcar continues east, with another alleyway crossing, and crosses South 800 East. Lake Street and South 800 East are the other two of the three road crossings where vehicular traffic is only controlled by stop signs rather than traffic lights. Continuing further east it crosses South 900 East. Immediately east of South 900 East the S Line arrives at the Sugarmont station (Note: The Sugarmont station was previously called 900 East in the planning stages of the Sugar House Streetcar) at 2215 South 900 East. The streetcar also begins a stretch which runs east along the north side of Sugarmont Drive. At about 1010 East the tracks diverge once again before reaching the Fairmont station, (Note: The Fairmont station was previously called McClelland in the planning stages of the Sugar House Streetcar) which is located immediately west of the south end of McClelland Street (1040 East) at 2216 S McClelland Street. The Fairmont station is also located just north of Fairmont Park and southwest of the Granit Block. Fairmont station is the last eastbound stop for Phase 1 of the S Line.

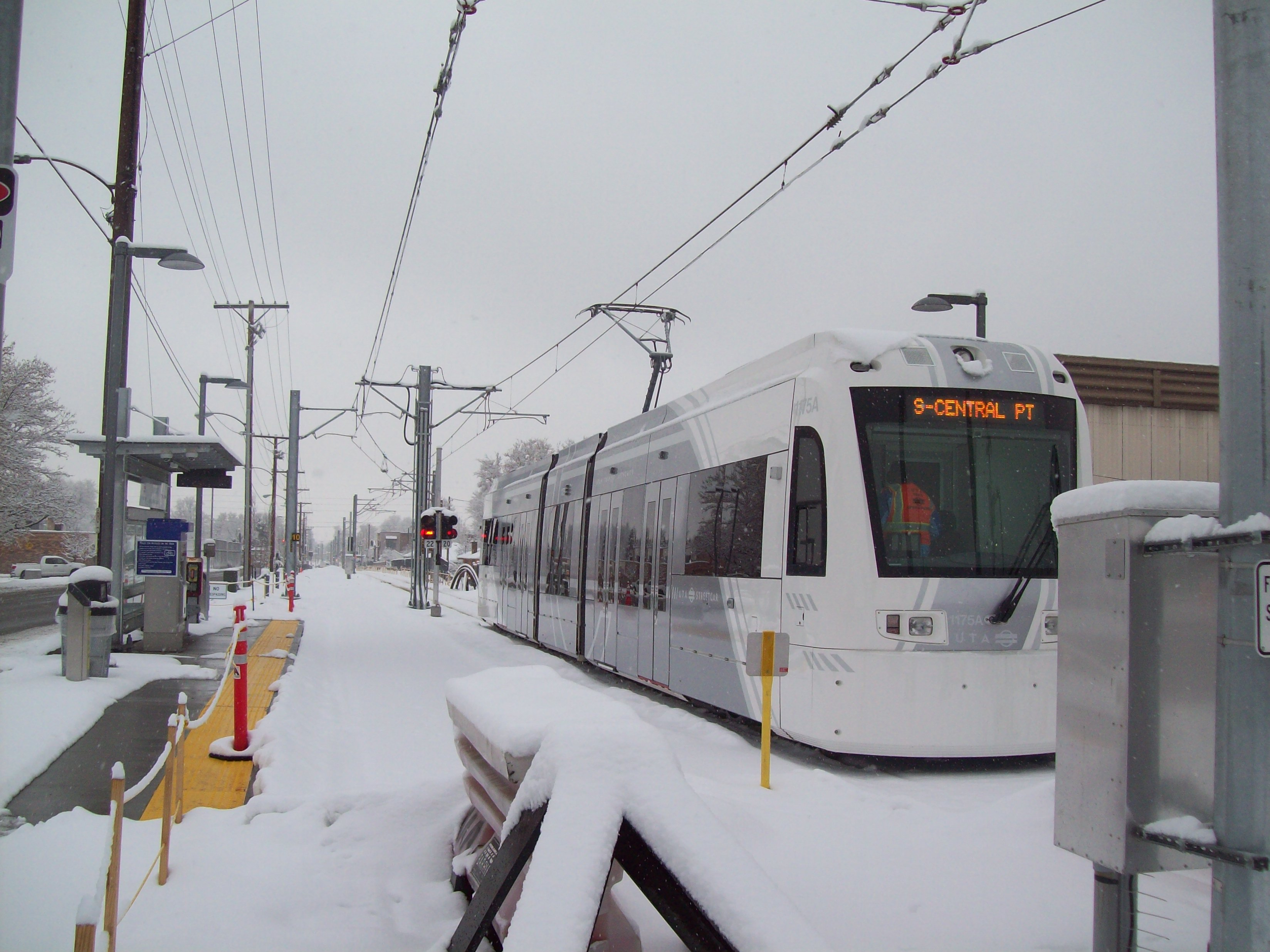
Fairmont station, the eastern end of the S Line, December 2013

From McClelland Street, Sugarmont Drive continues due east to Highland Drive at 1130 East and 2225 South (being one-way, westbound only, between 1100 East and Highland Drive). There is a proposal to realign this section of Sugarmont Drive to curve to the north to connect with Highland Drive at the west end of Wilmington Avenue (about 2190 South). Whether Sugarmont Drive is realigned or not, as part of Phase 2, the S Line will continue east along that street until the streetcar turns north along Highland Drive. Heading north, but slightly to the west, the S Line will run through the commercial district along Highland Drive until it reaches 2100 South. (At about 2150 South, Highland Drive curves from its north-northwest direction to head almost due north.) At East 2100 South, Highland Drive becomes South 1100 East. Heading north along 1100 East, the streetcar will pass by the ends of the following streets: the east end of Hollywood Drive (1970 South), the west end of a section of Ramona Avenue (1930 South), the east end of a section of Ramona Avenue (1910 South), the west end of a section of Westminster Avenue (1880 South), and the west end of East Garfield Avenue (1835 South). North of Ramona Avenue the streetcar leaves the commercial district and 1100 East has intermittent residential housing on both sides of the street. Continuing north along South 1100 East, the S Line will cross Blaine Avenue (1735 South) before reaching the northern border of the Sugar House neighborhood and the end of Phase 2 immediately south of 1700 South. Phase 2 will provide indirect service to Westminster College, the campus of which is just east of the end proposed S Line routing. (The campus of Westminster College occupies the entire area between 1200 East and 1300 East from 1700 South to 1850 South.)

== Streetcar schedule ==
On weekdays the first eastbound S Line streetcar (to the Fairmont station) leaves Central Pointe station at 5:12 am and the first westbound car (to the Central Pointe station) leaves the Fairmont station at 5:27 am. The last eastbound streetcar leaves Central Pointe station at 11:27 pm and the last westbound car leaves Fairmont station at 11:42 pm. (Note: Streetcar schedule is current as of Change Day, April 13, 2014)

On Saturdays and Sundays, the first eastbound S Line streetcar leaves the Central Pointe station at 6:02 am and the first westbound car leaves the Fairmont station at 6:17 am. The last eastbound streetcar leaves Fairmont at 11:47 pm and the last westbound streetcar leaves Fairmont at 11:32 pm.

S Line streetcars run every fifteen minutes on weekdays and Saturdays (except holidays when there is reduced or no service), and thirty minutes on Sundays like the TRAX system, and take about ten minutes to run the length of the route (of Phase 1).

== Stops ==
Just as UTA calls the vehicles used on this route "streetcars" instead of "trains", the line has "stops" instead of "stations". The difference is mainly in the size of the facilities. Each platform is only 59 feet (18 m) long, just long enough to fit a single Siemens S70US car. Each passenger platform includes a small canopy (not much larger than a standard small bus stop shelter), a ticket vending machine and an electronic card reader (used for charging fares with UTA FAREPAY cards by "tapping on" or "tapping off").

S Line (South Salt Lake–Sugar House)
Stop name	Municipality	Opening year	Connections	Park and Ride lot	Notes
Central Pointe	South Salt Lake	2013	701 703 704; 17, 21	57	S Line platform is southeast of (and only accessible from) the TRAX platform
South Salt Lake City	South Salt Lake	2013	200*	No	
300 East	South Salt Lake	2013		No	
500 East	South Salt Lake	2013	205*	No	
700 East	Sugar House, Salt Lake City	2013		No	
Sugarmont	Sugar House, Salt Lake City	2013	209*	No	
Fairmont	Sugar House, Salt Lake City	2013	220*	No	
Highland Drive	Sugar House, Salt Lake City	Planned	220*	No	
*Except for Central Pointe Station, none of the stops have any direct bus connections at the stop itself, but several have bus stops on nearby streets.

== See also ==
- Streetcars in North America
