= Sugarmont station =

Streetcar stop in Salt Lake City, Utah, United States

Sugarmont
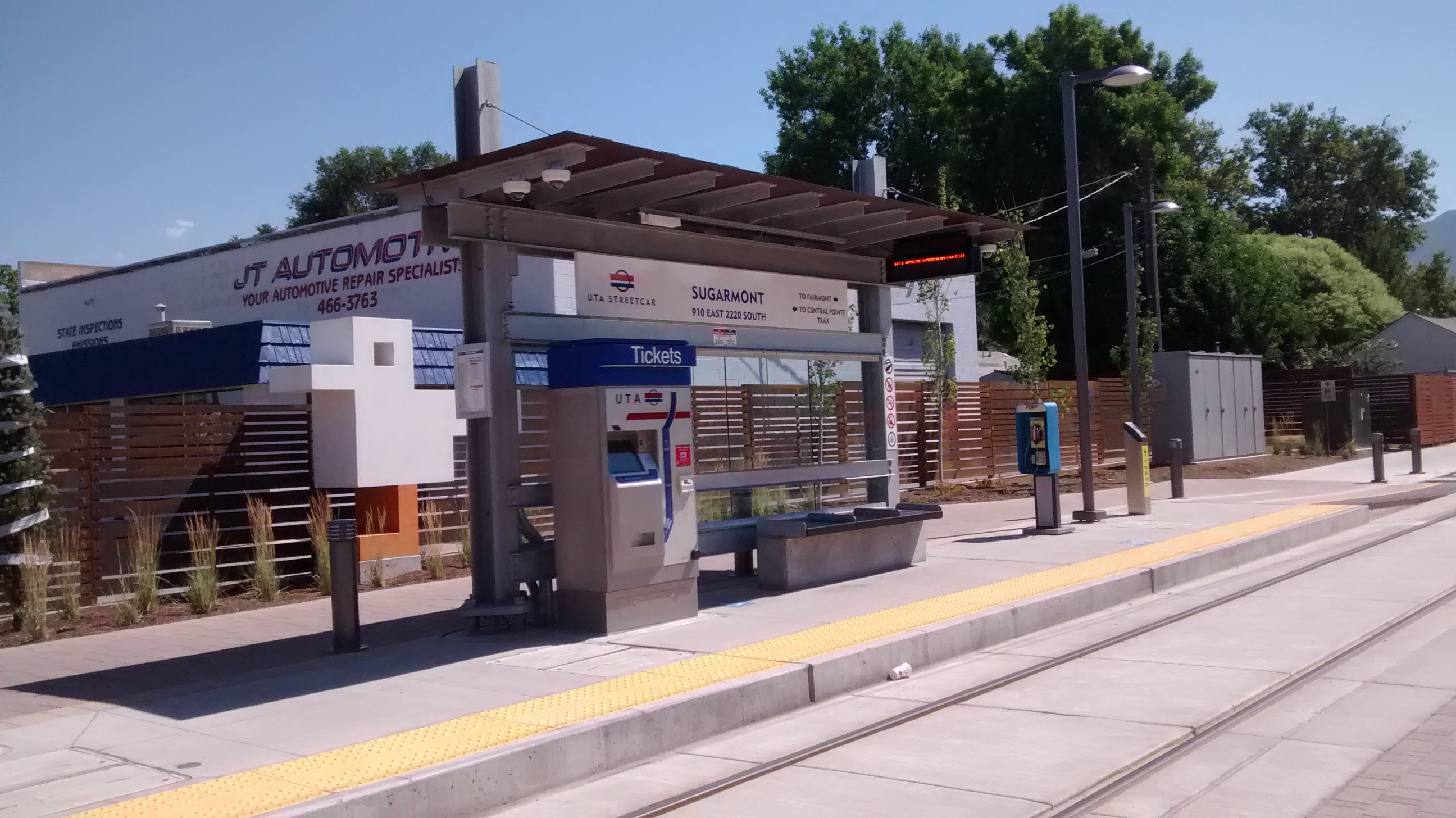
- Sugarmont platform

General information
- Location: 2215 South 900 East; Salt Lake City, Utah; United States
- Coordinates: 40°43′22″N 111°51′54″W
- Owner: Utah Transit Authority (UTA)
- Platforms: 1 side platform
- Tracks: 1
- Connections: UTA: 209

Construction
- Structure type: At-grade
- Cycle facilities: Yes
- Accessible: Yes

History
- Opened: December 8, 2013; 12 years ago

Services
Preceding station	Utah Transit Authority	Following station
700 East toward Central Pointe	S Line	Fairmont Terminus
Location

Sugarmont is a streetcar stop in the Sugar House neighborhood of Salt Lake City, Utah, served by Utah Transit Authority's (UTA) S Line (previously known as the Sugar House Streetcar). The S Line provides service from Sugar House to the city of South Salt Lake (where it connects with UTA's TRAX light rail system).

== Description ==
The Sugarmont stop is located at 2215 South 900 East, just east of South 900 East on the north side of Sugarmont Drive. The side platform is located on the north side of the single set of tracks. There is very limited street-side parking possible nearby. The stop began service on December 8, 2013, and is operated by Utah Transit Authority.
