= Farepay =

Public transit fare card in Salt Lake City area

FAREPAY
- Location: Salt Lake City metropolitan area
- Launched: October 16, 2013
- Manager: Utah Transit Authority
- Currency: USD ($5 minimum load, $2000 maximum load)
- Auto recharge: Yes
- Validity: TRAX; Bus routes (including BRT); FrontRunner; S Line; UTA On-Demand
- Website: https://farepay.rideuta.com/

Farepay, stylized in all caps as FAREPAY, is a contactless smart card used for automated fare collection on public transit services operated by the Utah Transit Authority in the Salt Lake City metropolitan area, including buses, light rail, and commuter rail. The card is available at UTA Customer Service centers and participating retailers, as well as online. The card is available for purchase at a base cost of $3.00, with a $5.00 minimum balance that can be reloaded.

== History ==
Prior to the release of Farepay, using public transit required using cash or purchasing tickets or tokens at ticket vending machines. In October 2013, the Farepay card was launched with a 20% discount on rail trips and 40% discount on bus trips made with the card to promote the switch to the new system, with the discount intended to last until December 31, 2014. The discount was not eliminated, although the bus discount was reduced to 20% in December 2020. On August 18, 2024, the discounts were replaced with a daily and weekly farecap, equivalent to two trips a day and eight trips a week. System updates led to certain older FAREPAY cards becoming unusable after January 2025, with UTA providing replacements for these cards free of charge.

UTA aims to implement the ability to purchase Farepay cards at ticketing kiosks instead of paper tickets as well as tap-to-ride to allow contactless credit and debit cards to be used at Farepay card readers by 2026. The Farepay cards will also replace monthly passes, as these passes are built in to the fare capping system.

== Usage ==
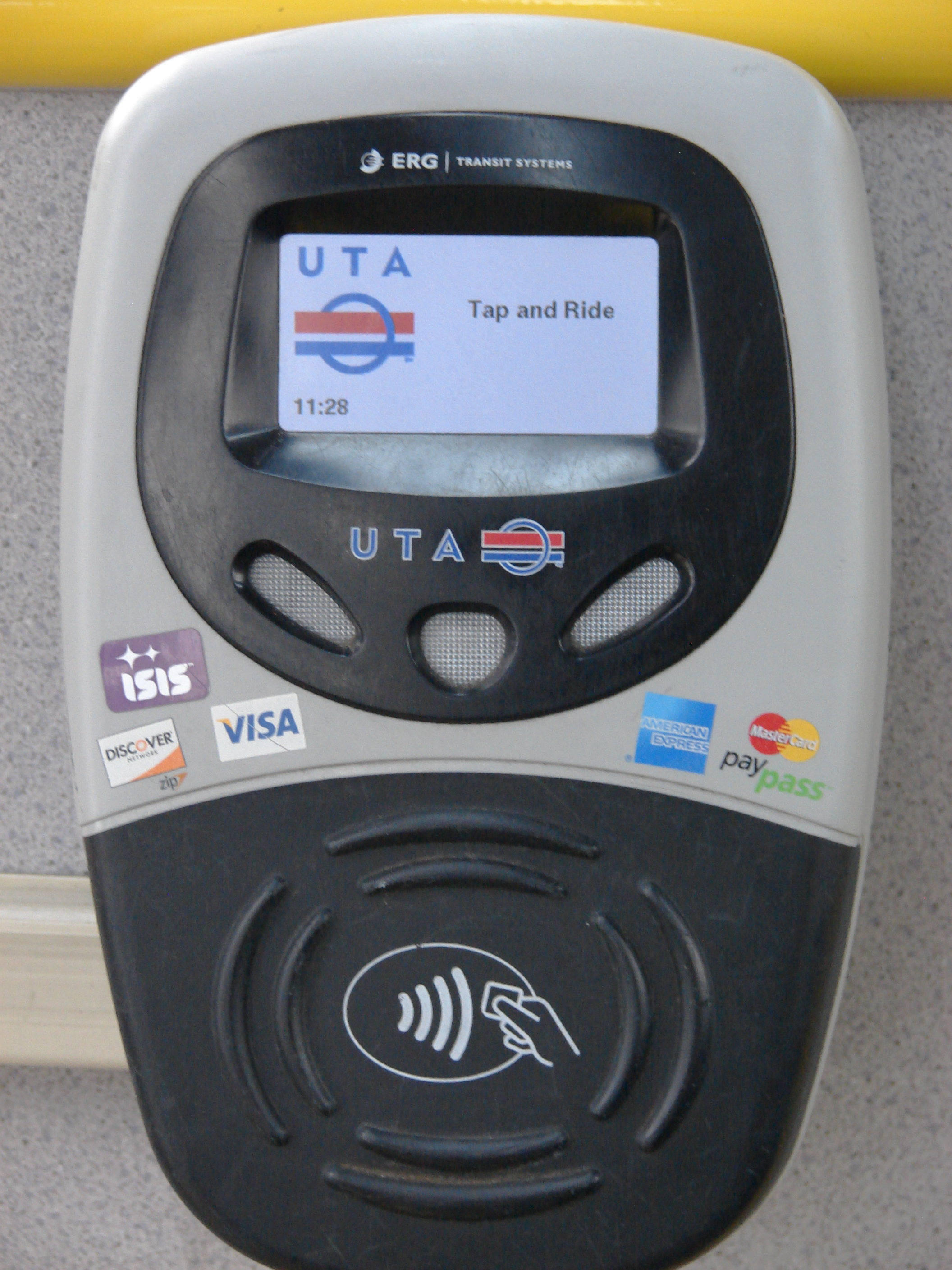
FAREPAY reader on UTA bus

Riders must tap on and off at the designated Farepay readers when boarding or entering a bus, train, or light rail service. As TRAX allows for transfers, riders are able to tap off when they exit the light rail system, not when they exit the train. UTA charges a flat fee for most services, except for the commuter rail FrontRunner system, which has a base charge for a trip of a single station and an additional per-station fare. If a rider fails to tap off on FrontRunner, they will be charged for the full possible length of the trip.

UTA offers a reduced fare program for seniors above the age of 65, children from 6-18, persons with disabilities, and low-income individuals at 200% or below the federal poverty guidelines. Applicants are to apply online and provide the necessary verification information. Since EFC systems are not installed on UTA's paratransit services, they are not eligible for fare caps, reduced fares, or other benefits that the Farepay card provides.

Fares and Fare Caps
Service	Standard			Reduced		
Service	Per-Trip Fare	Daily	Weekly	Per-Trip Fare	Daily	Weekly
Local (TRAX, bus, UTA On-Demand, S-Line)	$2.50	$5	$20	$1.00	$2	$8
Premium (FrontRunner, Ski Bus, Express Bus)	FrontRunner: $2.50 for first stop, $0.60 per additional stop Ski Bus and Express Bus: $5	$10	$40	FrontRunner: $1.25 for first stop, $0.25 per additional stop Ski Bus and Express Bus: $2.50	$4	$16

These fares do not apply on the TRAX and bus routes in the Salt Lake City Fare Free Zone in downtown Salt Lake City between Salt Lake Central Station, the State Capitol, Library Station, and Matheson Courthouse Station. The Farepay card is accompanied by an online site that allows customers to load funds remotely, set up automatic reloads, and check their fare cap, among other features. Riders can load cards with between $5-$500 at once.

Fares can still be purchased and used without the Farepay card. UTA still offers monthly passes, school and student passes, paper transit passes, cash, or tickets from the Transit app as valid options. Many student passes, such as those for the University of Utah, Brigham Young University, Ensign College, or Utah Valley University are built-in to student IDs, while some others have separate passes. Depending on the pass, these student passes may not be valid on FrontRunner, the Ski Bus, or paratransit.
