= Bonneville Shoreline Trail =

Long-distance hiking trail in the United States

Coordinates: 41°00′N 111°53′W

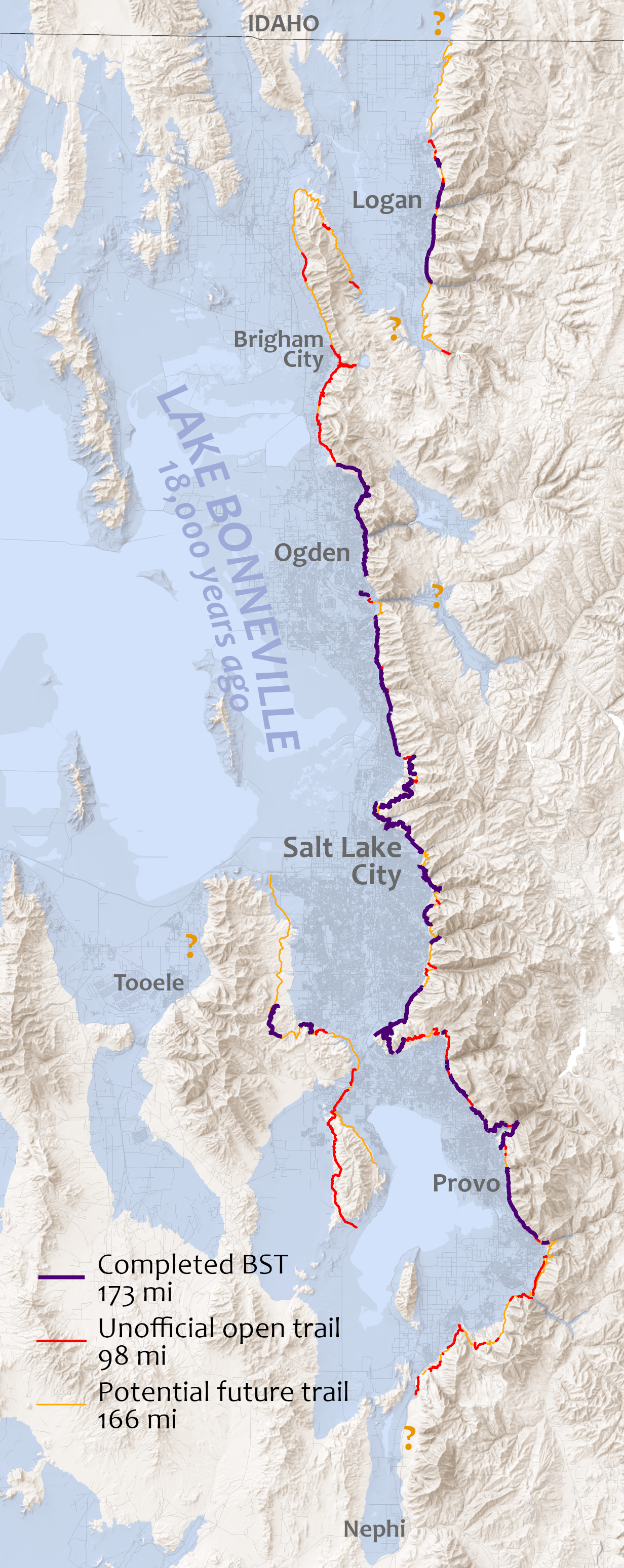
Proposed and existing Access points for the Bonneville Shoreline Trail

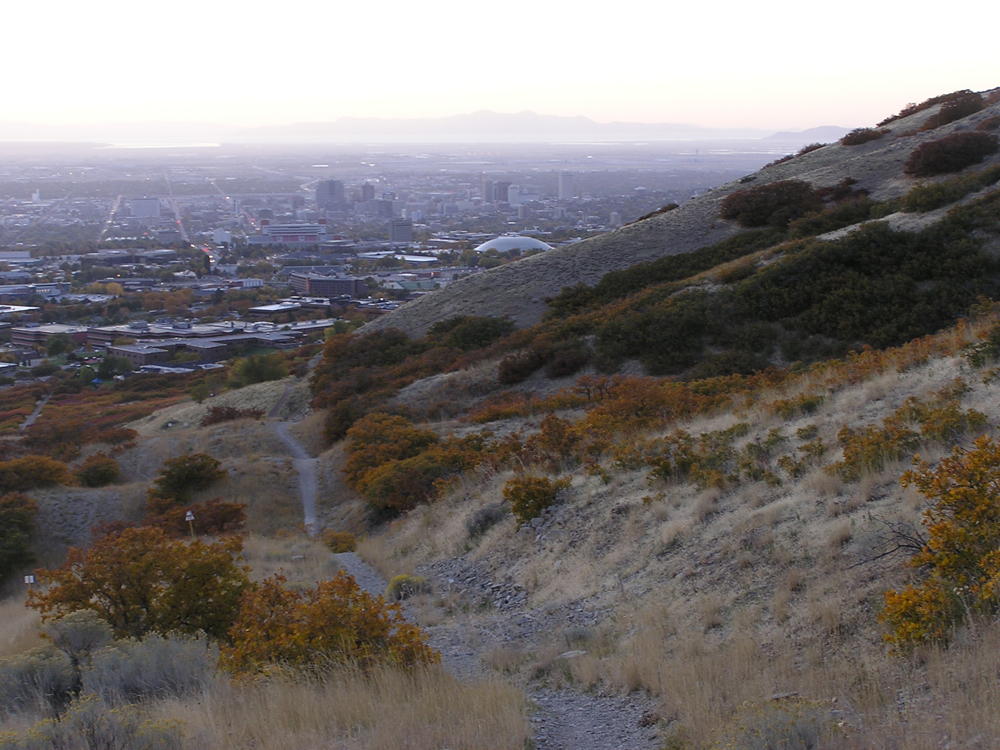
Bonneville Shoreline Trail overlooking Salt Lake City.

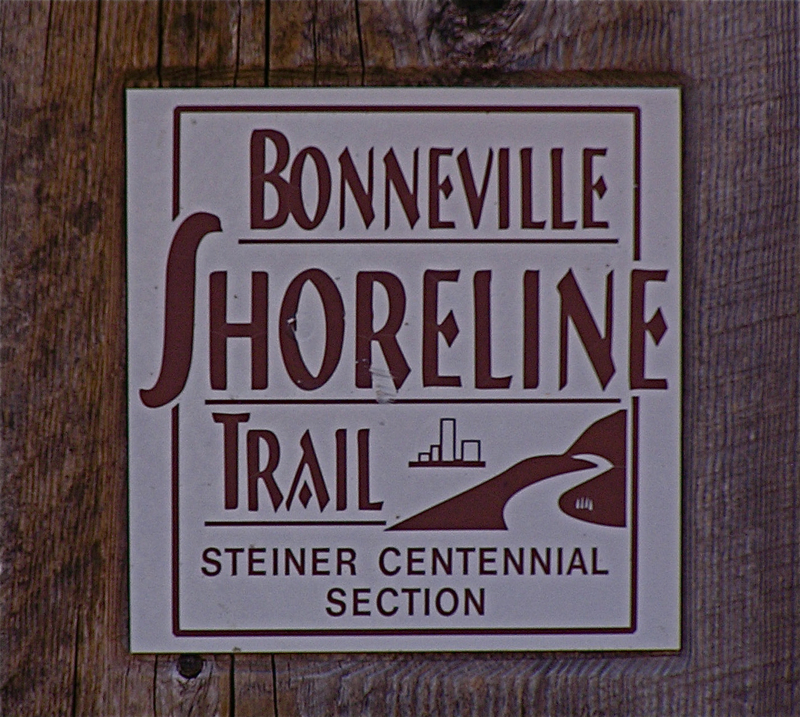
Bonneville Shoreline Trail marker

The Bonneville Shoreline Trail (BST) is a mixed use (biking/hiking) recreation trail in Utah that roughly follows the shoreline of the ancient Lake Bonneville, a prehistoric pluvial lake which existed in northern Utah before naturally draining about 14,000 years ago. It closely follows the wildland–urban interface between the Wasatch Front metropolitan area and the Wasatch Mountains. Some sections of the trail are complete while other parts are still being developed. The Bonneville Shoreline Trail hopes to one day stretch from the Idaho border (north of Logan, Utah) and run southward all the way to Nephi, Utah. In recent years, the vision has also extended to include the western edge of Utah and Salt Lake Valleys.

While the planned termini are 150 miles (240 km) apart, the trail route weaves in and out of many canyons of the Wasatch Mountains, so the currently planned route totals over 350 miles. Most of the trail is natural surface, but there are a few segments of paved pathways, most notably a series of bridges crossing I-80 and I-215 at the mouth of Parley's Canyon in Salt Lake City, built in 1999. Passing near the large population centers of the Wasatch Front, the planned trail is located within 20 miles (32 km) of 80% of the population of Utah.

The concept for the Bonneville Shoreline Trail dates from 1990 as a way to connect and preserve existing trails above Salt Lake City, for which the advocates organized the Bonneville Shoreline Trail Committee, but the idea soon caught on in other cities. Construction was spurred on by the trail's recognition in 1999 by the State of Utah as a Millennium Legacy Trail. By the early 2000s, several isolated segments had been completed totaling about 80 miles. The official trail reached 100 miles in the early 2010s, but about this time, the pace of construction slowed as obstacles arose and demand for new trail waned. There has been renewed energy in completing the trail during the 2020s, owing to several factors, notably the increase in outdoor recreation during the COVID-19 pandemic, and increased funding for outdoor recreation infrastructure from the State of Utah. More than 50 miles of new trail were built from 2021 to 2023, with the current (as of year-end 2024) total of 173 miles of official trail in about a dozen fragments. In addition to new trail, several areas are refurbishing and rerouting earlier trail to better routes.

The trail is not managed by a single governing body. The Bonneville Shoreline Trail Committee was instrumental in developing standards in the early years, but currently plays a supporting role. Most of the trail's construction and maintenance is conducted independently by county and city governments, community-level non-profit groups, and the Uinta-Wasatch-Cache National Forest. The primary challenge in completing the trail is the fact that it crosses dozens of government jurisdictions with hundreds of property owners. Most of the remaining gaps in the trail cross private property, and Utah state law currently prohibits the use of eminent domain for the creation of trails. In fact, this 2008 law came as a result of a lengthy legal dispute between Mapleton, a city in Utah County, and a land owner over a proposed segment of the BST.

In 2020 and 2021, the Bonneville Shoreline Trail Advancement Act was introduced in the U.S. Congress; it was eventually enacted as part of the 2022 appropriations bill (Law 117-328 Sec.303). This act adjusted the boundary of several National Forest wilderness areas in Salt Lake and Utah Counties to remove segments of the planned BST corridor so that bicycles can be allowed; in exchange, a large parcel of land in Millcreek Canyon was added to the Mount Olympus Wilderness. On March 26, 2025, congressional representatives from Utah introduced a bill (S.1135/H.R.3451) to study the feasibility of designating the Bonneville Shoreline Trail as a national scenic trail.
