= Jordan River Parkway =

Trail and greenway in Utah, United States

Coordinates: 40°21′26″N 111°53′57″W

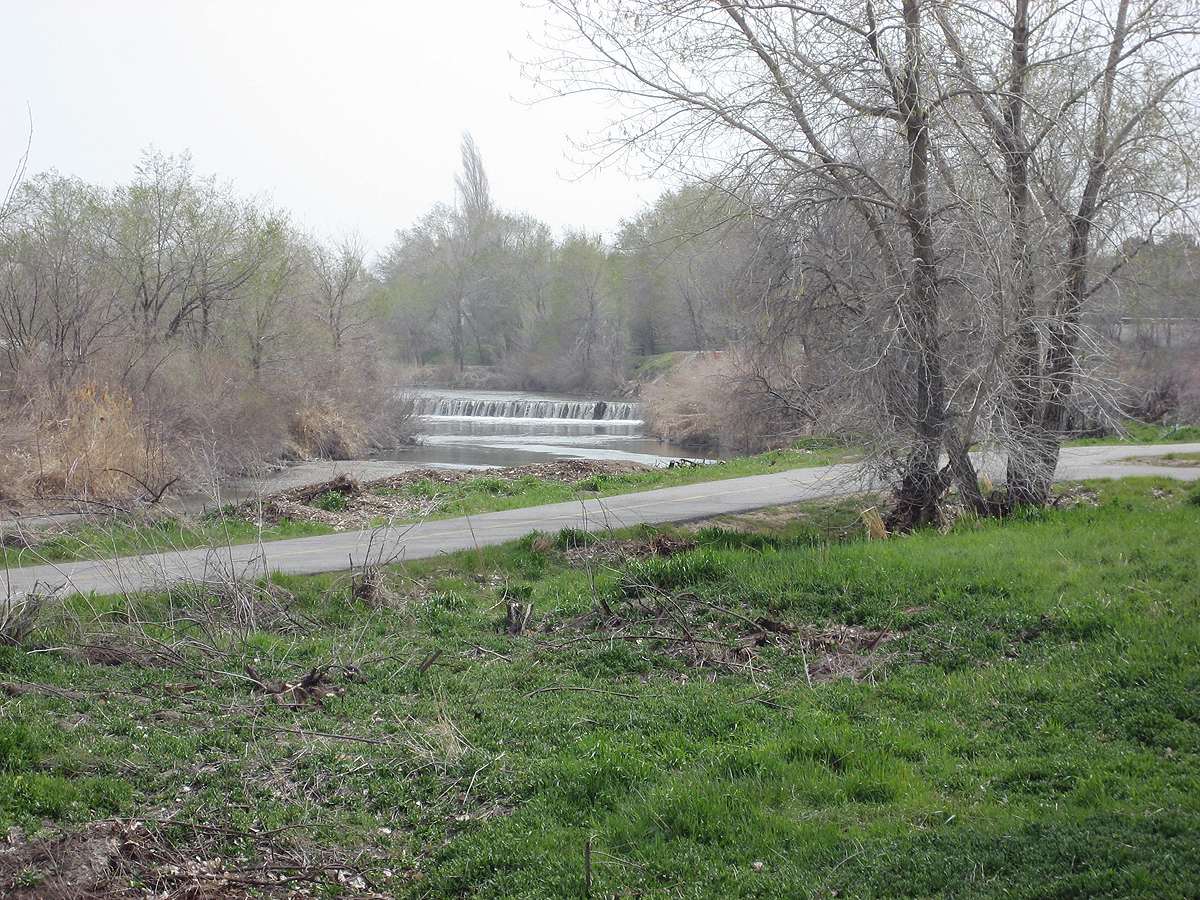
- Jordan River Parkway in Murray
- Length: 40 mi (64 km)
- Location: Utah
- Use: Hiking, biking, skating, equestrian
- Elevation change: 294 ft (90 m)
- Highest point: 4,494 ft (1,370 m)
- Lowest point: 4,200 ft (1,300 m)
- Difficulty: Easy
- Season: All

The Jordan River Parkway is an approximately 40-mile (64 km) urban park that runs along the Jordan River within the U.S. state of Utah. The parkway follows along the river from Utah Lake in Utah County, through Salt Lake County and onto the Great Salt Lake in Davis County. The majority of a mixed-use trail has been completed with a shared-use path for cyclists, skaters, and joggers. A separate equestrian path runs on the southern portion of the trail. Many trail-heads, city and county parks and golf courses are also located along the parkway.

== History ==
The parkway was conceived in 1971 primarily as a flood-control measure, but restoration of the floodplain, cleanup of pollution, adding trails and other recreational opportunities were also to be included. Requests for a river master plan included two reservoirs, the Lampton in South Jordan and the Riverton in Riverton and Draper, but plans for the reservoirs were dropped by the State Legislature in 1980. The Utah Legislature approved a bill in 1973 that created the Provo-Jordan River Parkway Authority. The Parkway Authority received $3 million in funds and was charged with constructing the parkway. The Parkway Authority moved slowly through the 1970s, primarily buying land and cleaning up the water, plus other cities were also buying land on the river.

By 1986, $18 million had been spent on the parkway, mostly from state funds. Land had been purchased and trails constructed for the Utah County portion. Much of the work in Salt Lake County had been done from Murray north with the addition of Murray Golf Course, several smaller parks and about 4 miles (6.4 km) of canoe runs and trails. By 2000, two U.S. Environmental Protection Agency Superfund sites were underway to being cleaned up. The Midvale Slag site sat adjacent to 6,800 feet (2,100 m) of the Jordan River. The site was contaminated from old smelter operations. The other Superfund site, Midvale Sharon Steel, sat adjacent to 4,000 feet (1,200 m) of the Jordan River.

== Trail-heads, attractions and/or access points ==
Numerous amenities of public parks, nature/wildlife preserves, benches, grassy areas, picnic tables, pavilions, restrooms, playgrounds, parking lots, canoe marinas, off highway vehicle (OHV) area, model plane ports, and equestrian areas can be found along the trail.

=== Jordan River State Park ===
A part of the Utah State Park System, it is operated by the state of Utah and is open from April through November. There are four tracks, with tabletops and banked turns; two motocross tracks, and two for OHVs and all-terrain vehicles. State-required OHV programs are available at this location. Also available is a model port, with a runway and open space for model radio-controlled airplanes. Except to walk or bicycle on the gravel path, a per-person fee is required for the use of the park. A trail-head is proposed on the north end of the park where the gravel trail ends.

=== Salt Lake City section ===
Salt Lake City maintains 3 parks and some parts of the trails along the river:

- paved trail which begins at Redwood Road and approximately 1800 North
- Riverside Park - tennis courts, soccer fields, football, Little League Baseball, softball field, basketball half court, horseshoes, grass volleyball, bowerys, ADA restrooms and ADA playgrounds. Nearby is the Day-Riverside Branch of the Salt Lake City Public Library system.

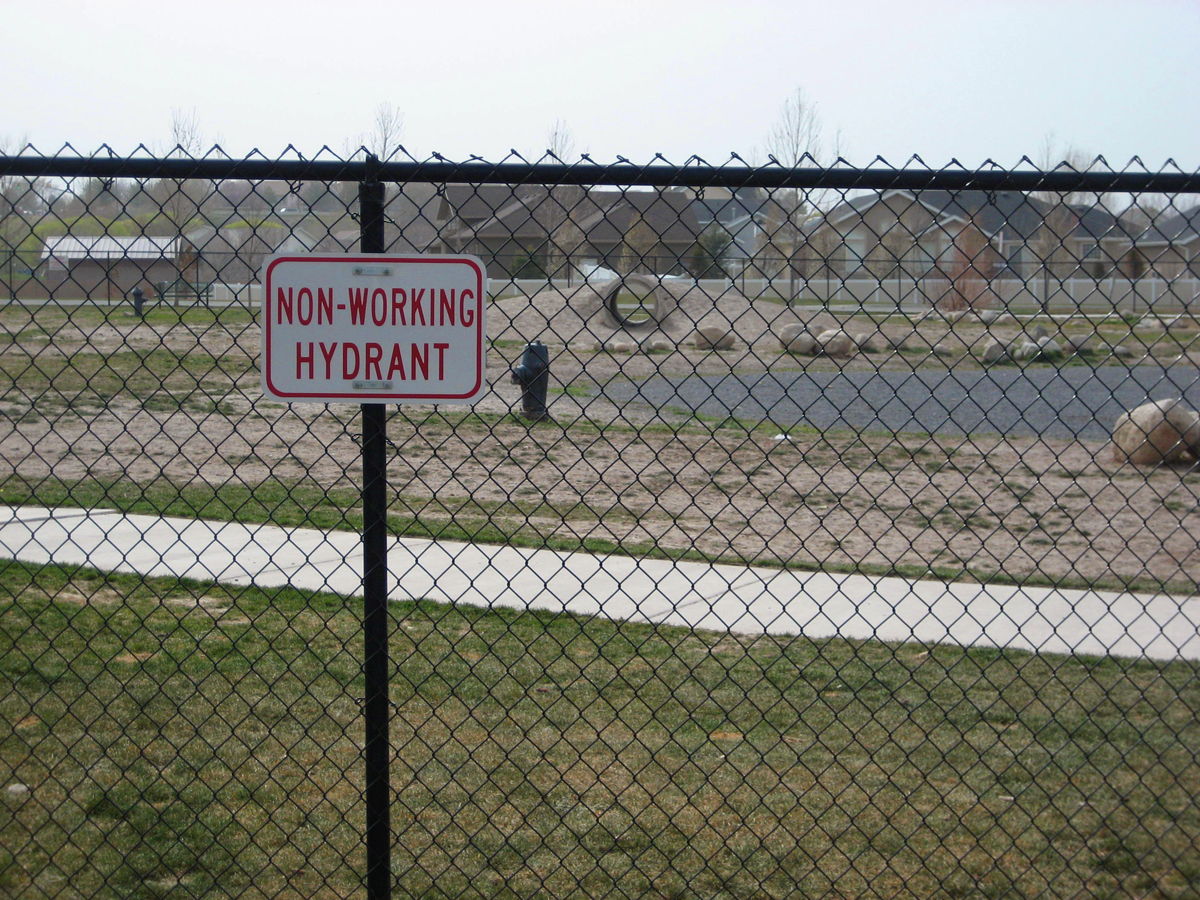
Dog Park on the Jordan River Parkway on 5400 South in Murray-Taylorsville area

- Cottonwood Park - 3 small shelters with table, medium bowery with small tables, gold mile walking path with quarter-mile markers, off-leash dog park, playground, sand volleyball box, half-court basketball, ADA restroom.
- Utah State Fairgrounds
- Gatsbys Trailhead
- 9th South Park
- Jordan Park - bowerys, picnic tables, fireplaces, sand volleyball, tennis, horseshoes, baseball field, International Peace Garden, off-leash area, skate park, ADA playgrounds and ADA restrooms.
- 17th South Canoe Marina

=== South Salt Lake and West Valley City section ===
Map of Mid-Salt Lake County section of the Jordan River Parkway

The City of South Salt Lake, Utah operates 1 park on the river:

- Paul Workman Park - softball/soccer field, restrooms, and a bridge crossing with trails on both sides of the river.

Salt Lake County operates 4 parks and the trails which connect them in the vicinity of West Valley City, Utah:

- Redwood Trailhead Park - small park across the river from Paul Workman Park
- Redwood Nature Area - Regional park, with trail connecting to the Decker Lake trail
- Utah Cultural Center - Building used for art shows, classes and other multicultural activities
- Oxbow Park - Canoe and boat launch (no motorized craft allowed)
- George P. Holm Park - (a.k.a. Little Dell)

=== Murray - Taylorsville section ===
Murray maintains 5 parks along the river. Most of the Murray section has an equestrian trail alongside the paved trail:

- Arrowhead Park - in the community of Xanadu
- Nature Center of Murray - the second-largest designated wetland area on the Jordan River with a small amphitheater on the river bank
- Germania Park - Equestrian trail start/end point
- Millrace Park - with off-leash area. Maintained by Taylorsville City
- Walden Park
- Cottonwood Grove / Winchester Park - Equestrian trail start/end point
- Willow Pond Park

=== Midvale and West Jordan section ===
Midvale completed a portion of trail in 2001 connecting with West Jordan at 7800 South heading southeast to 700 West at approximately 8600 South:

- 7100 South Trail-head
- Gardner Village Trail-head
- Midvale Trail-head

=== Sandy and South Jordan section ===
- Section from 9400 South - 9800 South completed in 2012
- Proposed Dimple Dell Trail-head to connect to Dimple Dell Regional Park
- Shield Lane Trail-head - with equestrian area
- 9800 South Trail-head
- Gravel section from 9800 South - 10600 South
- Jordan River Migratory Bird Reserve - along the river's east side from roughly 10800 South to 10000 South. Not open to the public.

=== Draper, Riverton and Bluffdale section ===
- Longest unfinished sections
- Riverton City Nature Park
- South County Pool
- Riverbend Nature Area

=== Utah County section ===
Good portions are completed either paved or graveled. Utah County maintains 5 areas/parks as well as the 9 miles (14 km) of trail between the northern county line and Utah Lake:

- Indian Ford Park - Near the Salt Lake County line, maintained by Utah County. Indian Ford Park has paved trails and is still under development. The name is from historical accounts that claim this narrow area in the Jordan served as a crossing-point for local Native American tribes. During the dredging of the Jordan River in the 1980s, a large boulder was removed from this location; it sits today at the entrance to Utah County's Inlet Park. When developed, Indian Ford will offer picnic tables and other amenities. For now, it serves as a crossing-point on the river for the Jordan River Parkway.
- Thanksgiving Point - On the paved trail, Thanksgiving Point is an area near the river where a non-profit group operates gardens, a golf course, museums, shopping, dining, other social and educational places and attractions.

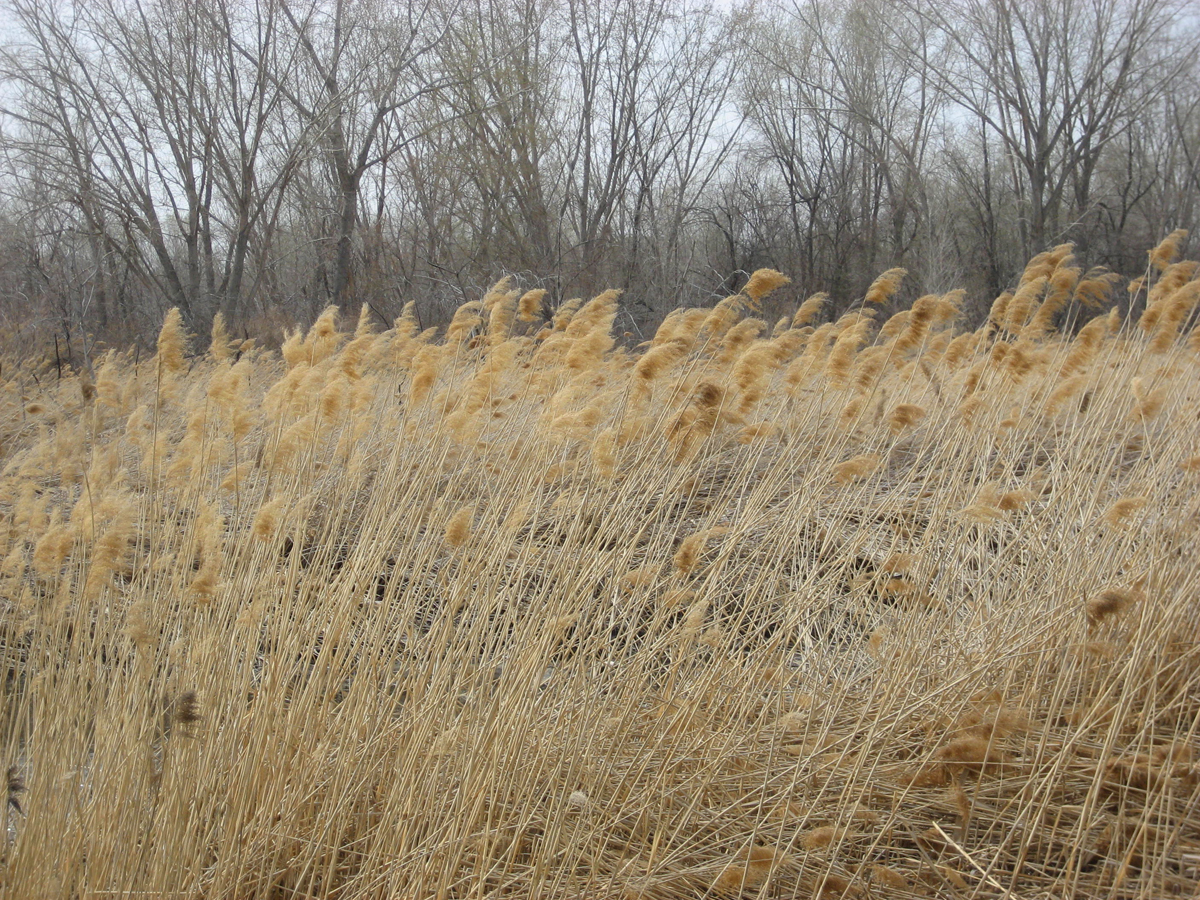
The Jordan River Parkway wetlands nature preserve in Murray-Taylorsville area

- Wildlife Park - a large area south of 9600 North near Lehi, Utah. Utah County maintains this parcel. Accessible only by the Jordan River Parkway, the area is dedicated to wetlands use. An old trestle bridge spanning the Jordan River was constructed prior to World War I. This one-lane bridge served the farmers and families who lived here and provided quick access to the grazing lands and canyons to the west. The old bridge was replaced some time ago by a modern structure, but this historic landmark remains. The main attractions of this site are nature viewing and mixed use trails.
- Willow Park - Over 50 acres (200,000 m^{2}) in Lehi, Utah designed for individual, family, or group activities. This park is developed around a large group of aged willow trees and open grassy areas allowing recreation and relaxation activities. Group and individual camping sites have fire rings, quick access to restrooms and potable water, and shelter from the sun. The open grass provides parking for recreational vehicles, campers and large trailers as well as space for frisbee, softball, or similar activities. A canoe launch onto the Jordan River allows water enthusiasts quick access to the winding river. Amenities and attractions at this park include camping, picnic tables, BBQ pits, canoeing, fishing, group site, hiking, horseshoes, water, volleyball, restrooms, trails, playground, pavilion.
- Model Airplane Park - (a.k.a. Wetlands Park) Situated along the banks of the Jordan River in Saratoga Springs. Runways have been paved and staging locations constructed. The surrounding is a flat, treeless landscape, ideal for radio controlled airplane activity. Utah County is planning some future improvements that will include drinking water.
- Inlet Park - In Saratoga Springs, the park was first realized during the dredging work on the Jordan River during the 1980s. Its name indicates that it is located at the "inlet" to the Jordan River and Utah Lake. This 4-plus acre site serves as a trail-head to the parkway, and the open grassy expanses offer room for users. Inlet also provides quick access to both Utah Lake and the Jordan River for fishermen and other related uses. Future development of the park will offer a wider assortment of family-oriented activities. Amenities and attractions at this park include fishing, restrooms, trails, walking, pavilion, playground.

== Gallery ==
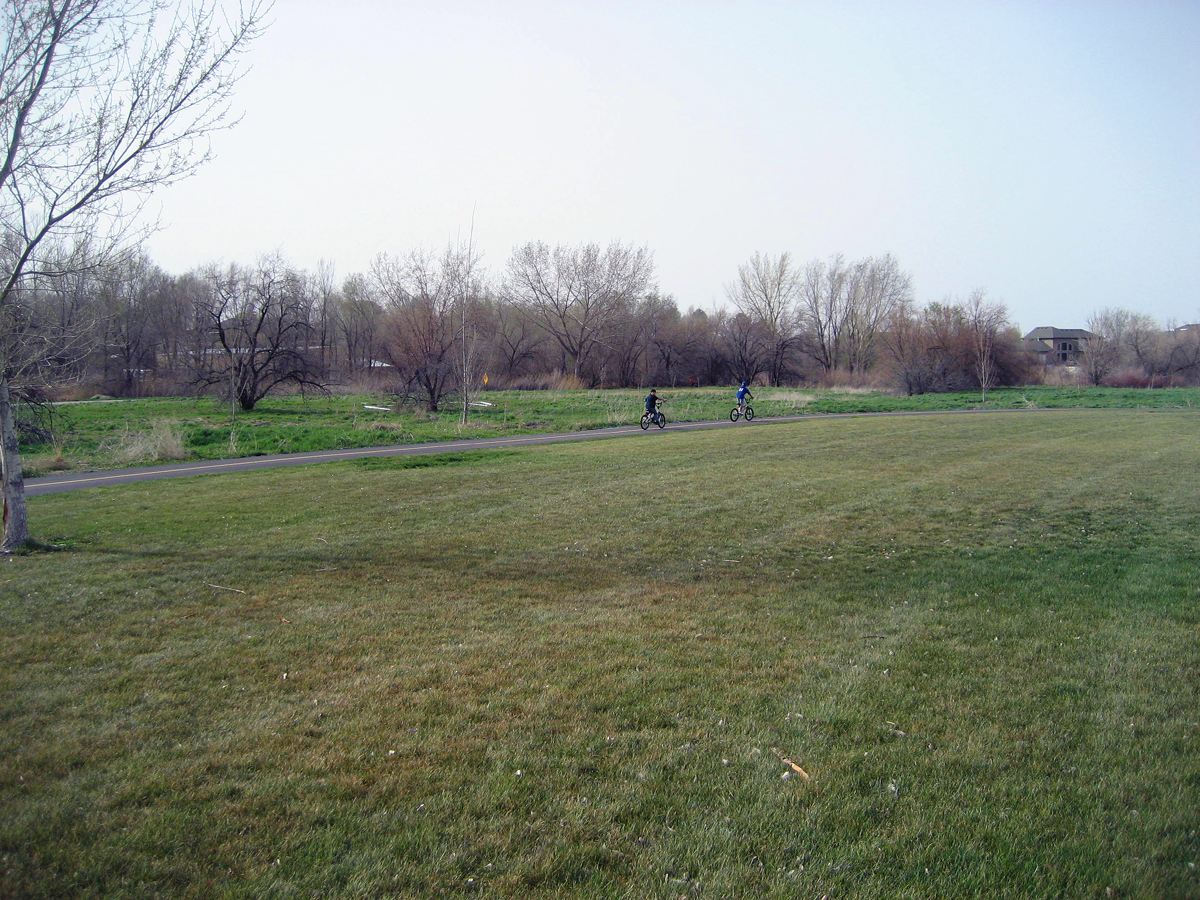
The Jordan River Parkway is popular with bicyclers of all types

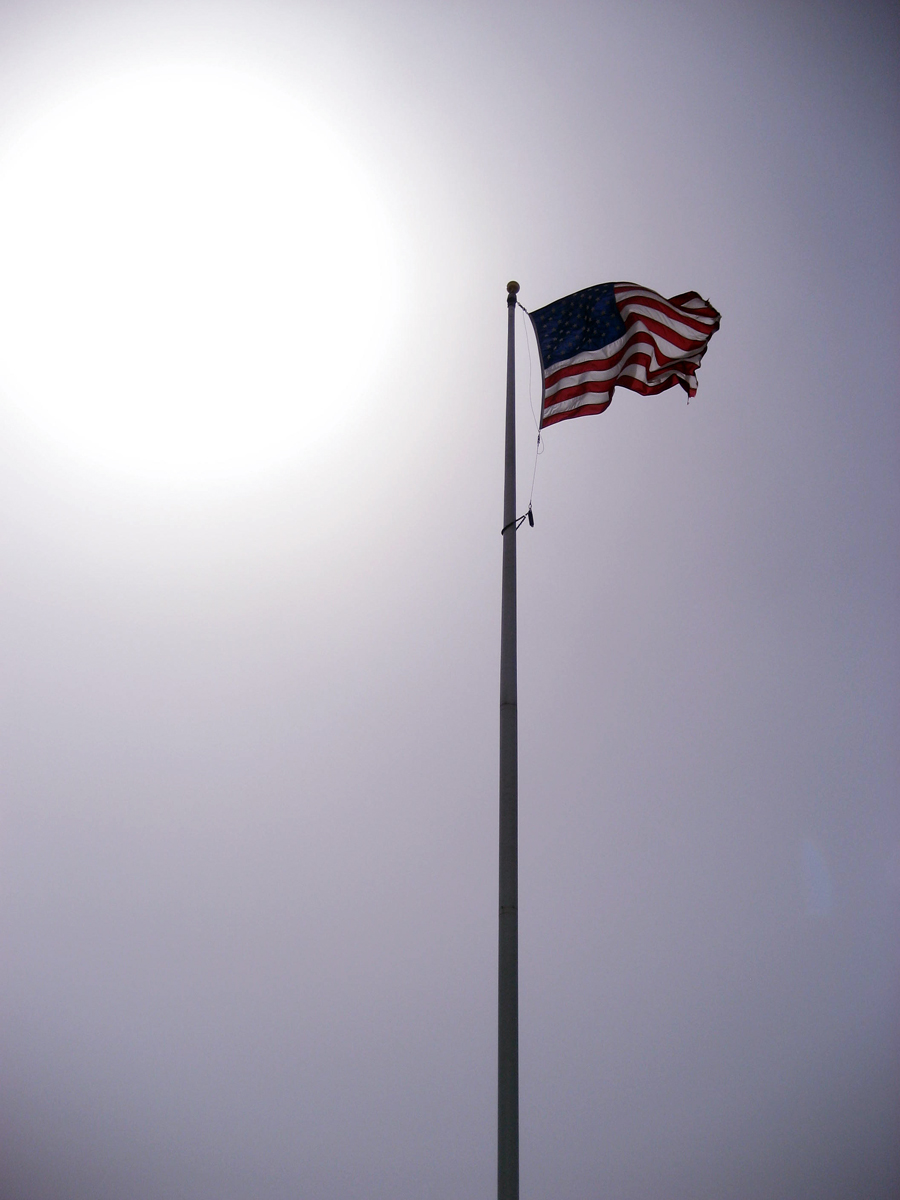
The Freedom Shrine pays tribute to locals who served in the military
