= Central Pointe station =

Light rail station in South Salt Lake, Utah, United States

Central Pointe
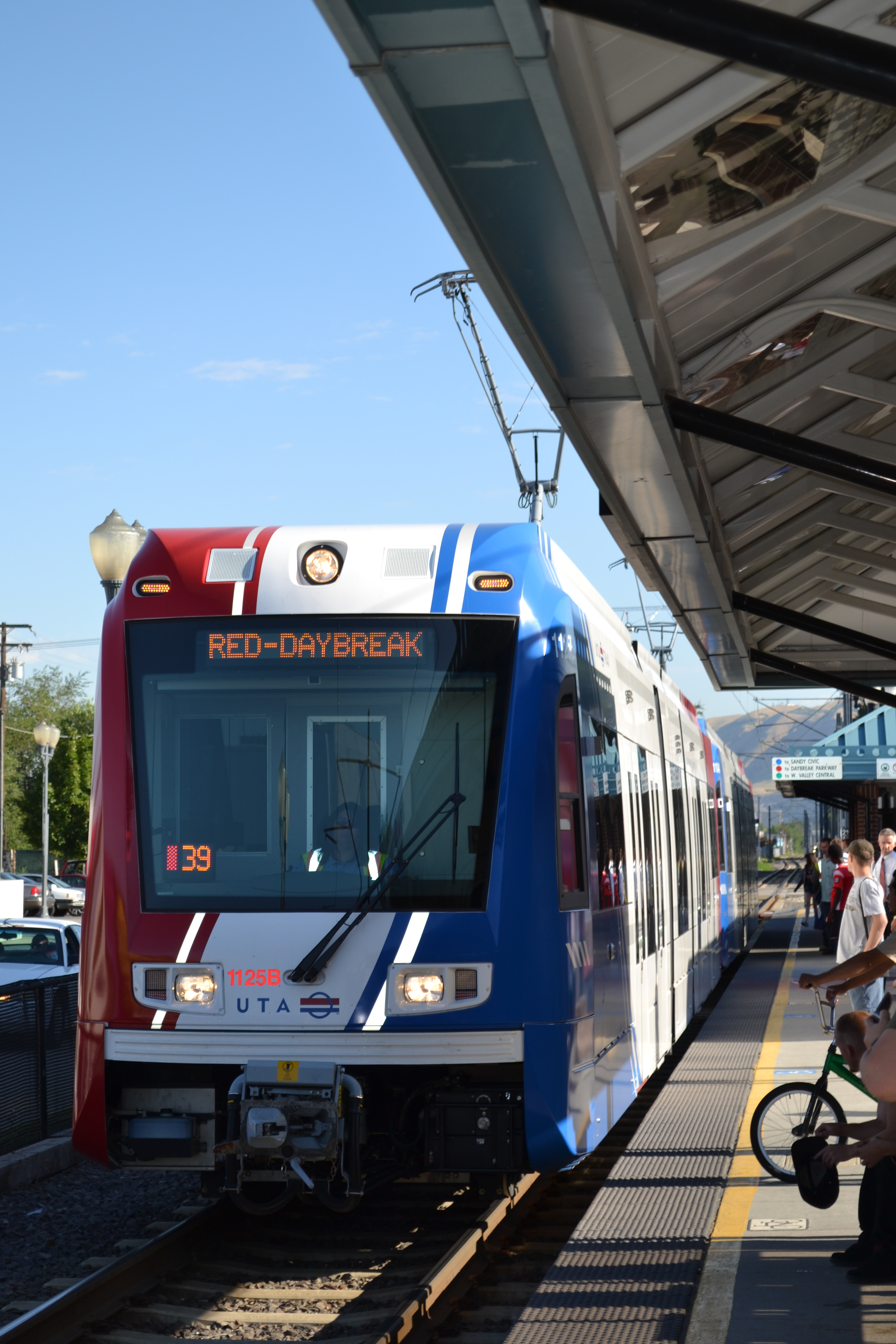
- Red Line train at Central Pointe Station

General information
- Location: 221 West 2100 South; South Salt Lake, Utah; United States
- Coordinates: 40°43′28″N 111°53′49″W
- Owner: Utah Transit Authority (UTA)
- Platforms: 1 island platform (TRAX); 1 side platform (Streetcar)
- Connections: UTA: 17, 21

Construction
- Structure type: At-grade
- Parking: 57 spaces
- Cycle facilities: 5 lockers
- Accessible: Yes

History
- Opened: December 4, 1999; 26 years ago

Services
| Preceding station | Utah Transit Authority | Following station |
|---|---|---|
| Ballpark toward Salt Lake Central | Blue Line | Millcreek toward Draper Town Center |
| Ballpark toward University Medical Center | Red Line | Millcreek toward Daybreak Parkway |
| Ballpark toward Airport | Green Line | River Trail toward West Valley Central |
| Terminus | S Line | South Salt Lake City toward Fairmont |
Former services
| Preceding station | Utah Transit Authority | Following station |
|---|---|---|
| Ballpark toward University Medical Center | Sandy/University Line | Millcreek toward Sandy Civic Center |
Location

Central Pointe station is a light rail station in South Salt Lake, Utah, in the United States, served by all three lines of the Utah Transit Authority's (UTA) TRAX light rail system. In December 2013, the station also became the western terminus for the S Line (formerly known as Sugar House Streetcar).

== Description ==
The TRAX portion of the station is located at 221 West 2100 South and the streetcar portion is located at 193 West Utopia Avenue. Both portions are accessible from eastbound 2100 South, a major east–west corridor that marks the boundary between South Salt Lake and Salt Lake City. The station has one island platform for TRAX and a separate side platform for the S Line streetcar. The S Line passenger side platform is located just southeast of the TRAX island platform and is situated east of both sets of TRAX tracks, but west of the single set of tracks for the S Line. It only accessible from the southern end of the TRAX platform. The station is the southernmost station that is served by all three TRAX lines. Central Pointe opened for service on December 4, 1999, as part of the Blue Line, built in preparation for the 2002 Winter Olympics. Streetcar service began on December 8, 2013. The station has a free Park and Ride lot with about 57 parking spaces available, however, commuters are prohibited from parking in the adjoining shopping center lot. Five covered bicycle lockers are also located at the station, which must be rented from UTA in advance for a fee. Two ticket machines are located on the platform that provide single-ride, round trip, and day passes, as well as family and discounted fare tickets. The vending machines are cash-only and provide change in dollar coins and quarters only.

== TRAX lines ==
The Blue Line connects with the Salt Lake Intermodal Hub (Salt Lake Central) in Downtown Salt Lake City on the north (with connections to Amtrak inter-city rail and FrontRunner commuter rail) and downtown Draper (Draper Town Center) on the south. The Red Line connects with the University of Utah (University Medical Center) on the northeast and the Daybreak Community in South Jordan (Daybreak Parkway) on the southwest. Both the Blue and Red lines connect with FrontRunner on the south at Murray Central. The Green Line connects the Salt Lake City International Airport on the northwest with West Valley City (West Valley Central) on the southwest, via Downtown Salt Lake City, to the northeast. The Green Line also connects with FrontRunner on the north at North Temple Bridge/Guadalupe.

This is the southernmost station to be serviced by all three TRAX lines, as the Green Line diverges immediately south of this station.

== Streetcar ==
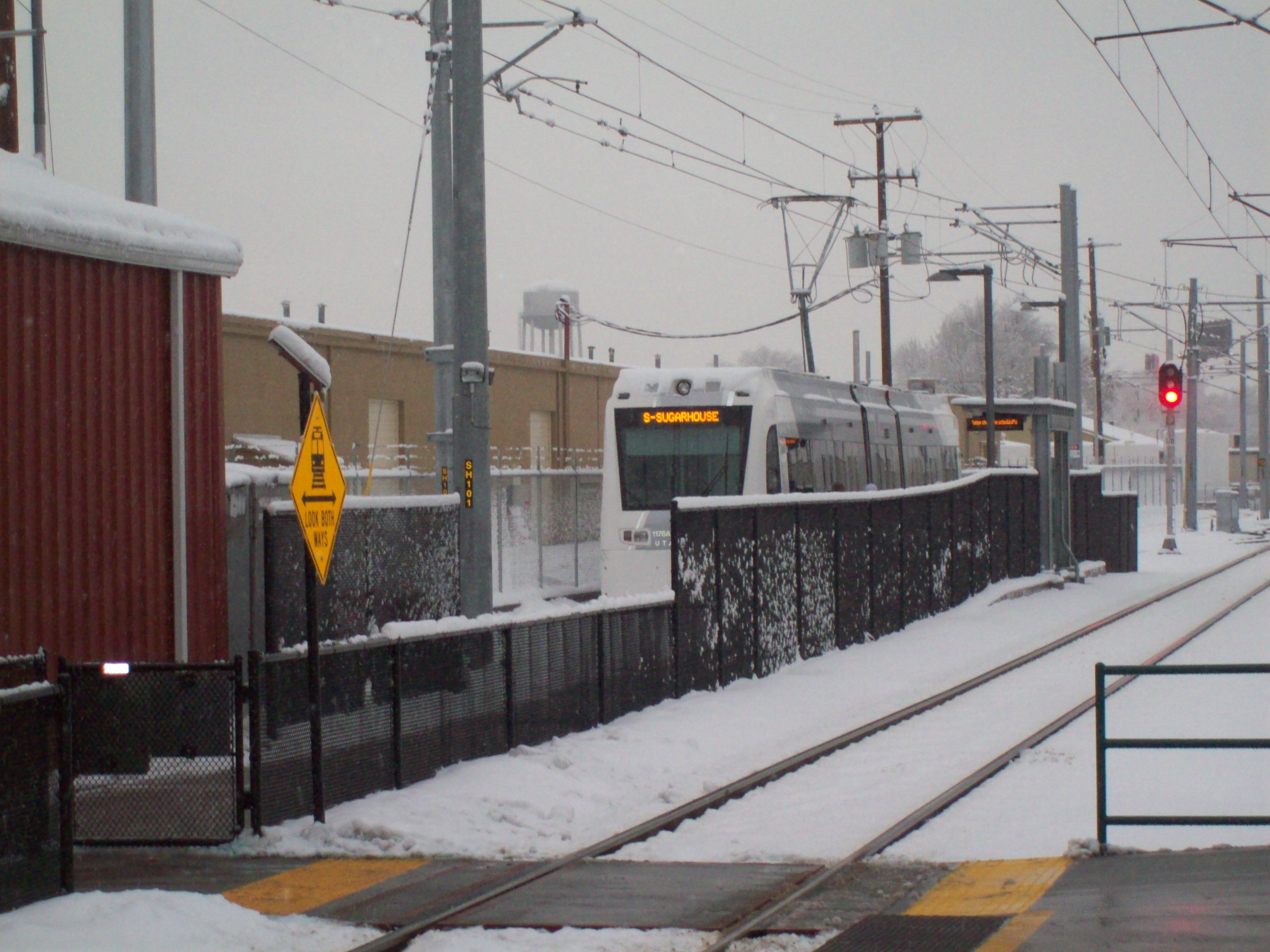
Looking south toward the S Line passenger platform from the southern end of the TRAX platform

The S Line streetcar (UTA's first streetcar) began service at the station on December 8, 2013. It runs east from this station to connect with the business district of the Sugar House neighborhood of Salt Lake City. As of the end of 2013, the S Line extends as far as the Granite Block (at about 1100 East and 2200 South), but there are plans to extend it further, having it run north from the Granite Block along 1100 East to 1700 South (near Westminster University). The streetcar passenger platform is only accessible from the southern end of the TRAX platform.

While similar to TRAX, the streetcar operates at a much slower speed and has stops placed closer together. It also consists of only one vehicle, rather than a "train" of vehicles.
