= Fairmont station =

Streetcar stop in Utah, United States

Fairmont
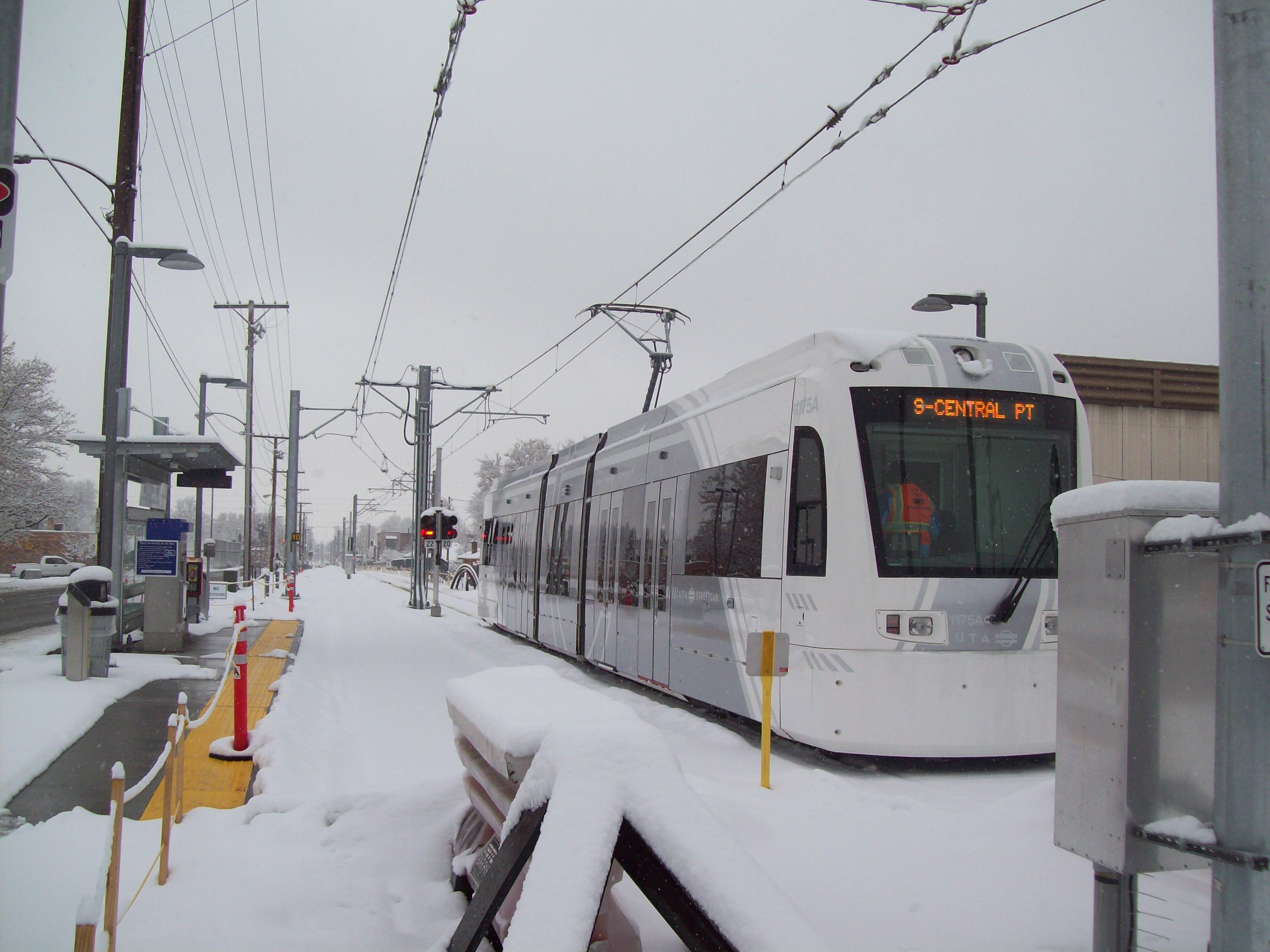
- A streetcar at Fairmont, the S Line terminus

General information
- Location: 2216 South McClelland Street; Salt Lake City, Utah; United States
- Coordinates: 40°43′22″N 111°51′42″W
- Owner: Utah Transit Authority (UTA)
- Platforms: 2 side platforms
- Tracks: 2

Construction
- Structure type: At-grade
- Accessible: Yes

History
- Opened: December 8, 2013

Services
Preceding station	Utah Transit Authority	Following station
Sugarmont toward Central Pointe	S Line	Terminus
Future services (Fall 2027)
Preceding station	Utah Transit Authority	Following station
Sugarmont toward Central Pointe	S Line	Highland Terminus
Location

Fairmont (1040 East) is a streetcar stop in the Sugar House neighborhood of Salt Lake City, Utah, served by Utah Transit Authority's (UTA) S Line (previously known as the Sugar House Streetcar). The S Line provides service from this station to Central Pointe station in South Salt Lake (where it connects with UTA's TRAX light rail system).

== Description ==
The Fairmont stop (previously referred to as McClelland) is located at 2216 South McClelland Street (1040 East), immediately west of McClelland Street on the north side of Sugarmont Drive. The stop is on the southwest corner of the Granite Block. Just west of this stop the single set of tracks diverges to form another passing track at this stop, however the track do not yet merge heading east since the tracks end at the stop. The two side platforms are located on the far north and south sides tracks. There is very limited street side parking possible nearby, as well as possibly at Fairmont Park. The stop began service on December 8, 2013, and is operated by Utah Transit Authority.

The Fairmont stop is the current eastern terminus of the S Line. As of 2026, construction has begun on an extension roughly 1/4 mile to the east. The extension will add a new station to the east of Highland Drive, which will serve the Sugar House Shopping center and become the new terminus of the line.
