= University Line (TRAX) =

Former light rail line in the Salt Lake Valley of Utah

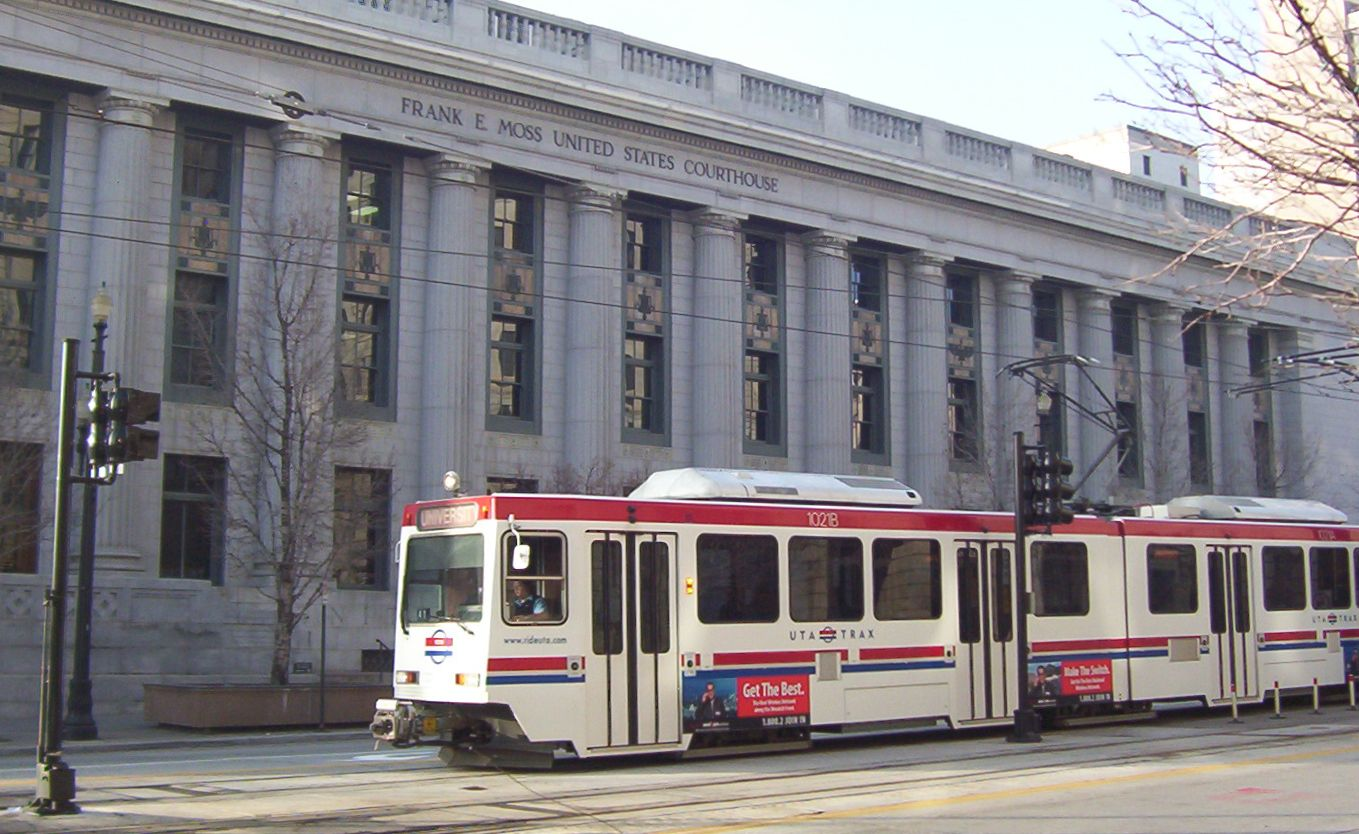
- A University train near the Frank E. Moss Federal Courthouse

Overview
- Status: Obsolete designation
- Owner: Utah Transit Authority (UTA)
- Locale: Salt Lake City, U.S.
- Termini: Delta Center/Arena (2001–2008) Salt Lake Central (2008–2011); Stadium (2001–2003) University Medical Center (2003–2011)
- Stations: 14

Service
- Type: Light rail
- System: TRAX
- Route number: UTA Route 702
- Operator: UTA

History
- Opened: December 15, 2001
- Closed: August 6, 2011

Technical
- Number of tracks: 2
- Track gauge: 1,435 mm (4 ft 8 1/2 in) standard gauge
- Electrification: Overhead catenary

The University Line was a light rail line of Utah Transit Authority's (UTA) TRAX system in Salt Lake City. It was the second TRAX line opened by UTA, after the Sandy/Salt Lake Line opened in 1999.

The original line ran from the Delta Center (now Arena) Station via University Boulevard to Stadium Station, serving Rice-Eccles Stadium on the University of Utah campus. The eastern end of the line was extended to the University Medical Center Station in 2003, and the western end was extended in 2008 to the new Salt Lake City Intermodal Hub (Salt Lake Central).

University Line service ended on August 6, 2011. Service on the eastern portion of the line was replaced by the Red Line, and the Salt Lake Central branch is now served by the Blue Line.

== History ==
In April 2001, a three-week closure of the Sandy/Salt Lake line's northern portion, between Gallivan Plaza and Arena stations, in Downtown occurred when the switch at 400 South Main Street was built to accommodate the University Line's western turn into Downtown. The first 2.3-mile (3.7 km) segment of the University Line opened on Saturday December 15, 2001, with service from the Delta Center to Rice-Eccles Stadium at a cost of $148.5 million, ahead of schedule and in time for the 2002 Winter Olympics, despite concerns that it would not be open in time. The entire UTA network (TRAX and buses) was free to all riders on opening day. The $89.4 million extension from Rice-Eccles Stadium to the University Medical Center opened in September 2003, a full 15 months ahead of schedule, adding 1.5 miles (2.4 km) of track and three new stations: University South Campus, Fort Douglas, and University Medical Center.

== Route description ==
The TRAX University Line was designated as UTA route 702.

Originally starting at the Delta Center at South Temple Street and 300 West, the end of the line was extended several blocks to Salt Lake Central (Salt Lake City Intermodal Hub) in 2008, where it connects with the FrontRunner. The extension started at 250 South 600 West and proceeded north a half block to 200 South, stopping at Old GreekTown. The line then proceeded to 500 West and turned north and then east, stopping at the Arena (next to the Delta Center). From the extension the route followed South Temple Street, turning south to Main Street. The line diverted at 400 South, heading east and ending its sharing of track with the Sandy/Salt Lake Line. Traveling on 400 South, trains would stop at Library, Trolley, and 900 East & 400 South before entering the University of Utah campus. Trains turned north at University Street, and then east at South Campus Drive and stopping at Stadium. The route continued on South Campus Drive to Wasatch Drive before stopping at University South Campus. Finally, it turned north at Wasatch Drive and followed that street to Fort Douglas and eventually terminating at University Medical Center, just south east of the Medical Center campus.

== Successor service ==
As of 2023, TRAX service continues at all stations formerly served by the University Line. The University Line's western segment from Salt Lake Central to Gallivan Plaza is served by the Blue Line, which continues south to Draper Town Center. The eastern segment from Library to University Medical Center is served by the Red Line, which continues south to Daybreak Parkway. The two lines connect at Courthouse station.

An expansion of the TRAX system, proposed in 2024, would reintroduce direct east-west service from the University of Utah to Salt Lake Central Station. The TRAX Orange Line is proposed to run from the University of Utah to Salt Lake City International Airport, via Salt Lake Central. New tracks would be constructed along University Boulevard from Main Street to Salt Lake Central, connecting with the existing line to the airport.

== Stations ==
Station	Address	Connections	Notes
Salt Lake Central (Salt Lake Intermodal Hub)	250 South 600 West	The FrontRunner; Amtrak California Zephyr; Greyhound Lines	Terminus
Old GreekTown	200 South 500 West	Sandy/Salt Lake Line	
Planetarium	200 South 400 West	Sandy/Salt Lake Line	
Arena	301 West South Temple	Sandy/Salt Lake Line	Former terminus
Temple Square	132 West South Temple	Sandy/Salt Lake Line	
City Center	100 South Main Street	Sandy/Salt Lake Line	
Gallivan Plaza	300 South Main Street	Sandy/Salt Lake Line	
Library	225 East 400 South		Last station within the Free Fare Zone
Trolley	625 East 400 South		
900 East & 400 South	875 East 400 South		
Stadium	1349 East 500 South		Former terminus until Medical; Center extension completed
University South Campus	1790 East South Campus Drive		
Fort Douglas	200 South Wasatch Drive (now Mario Capecchi Drive)		
University Medical Center	10 North Medical Drive (now Mario Capecchi Drive)		Terminus
