= 900 East station =

Light rail station in Salt Lake City, Utah, United States

900 East
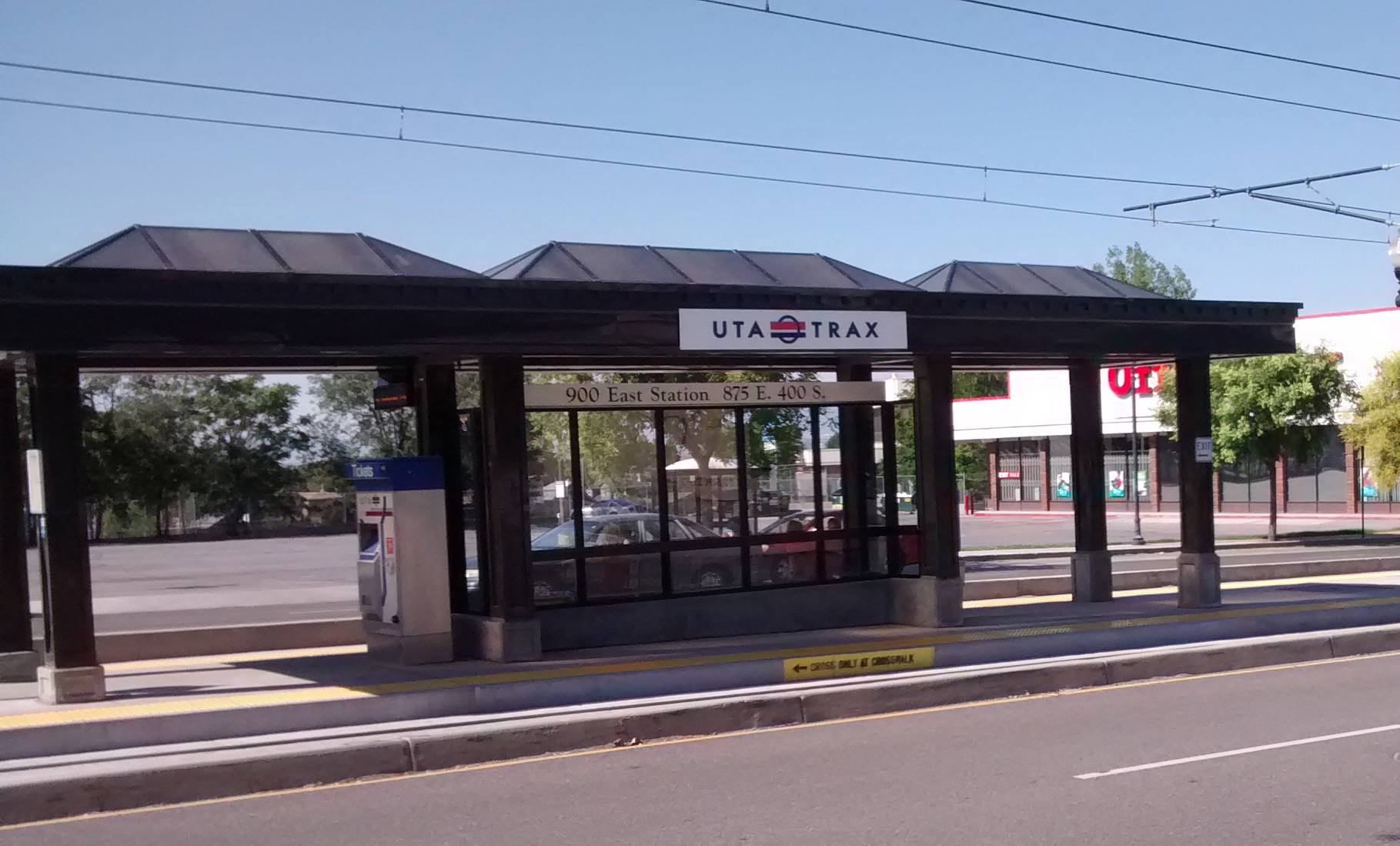
- 900 East station platform

General information
- Other names: 900 East & 400 South
- Location: 875 East 400 South (East University Boulevard); Salt Lake City, Utah; United States
- Coordinates: 40°45′38.4″N 111°52′00″W
- Owner: Utah Transit Authority (UTA)
- Platforms: 1 island platform
- Tracks: 2
- Connections: UTA: 4, 209, 455

Construction
- Structure type: At-grade
- Accessible: Yes

History
- Opened: December 15, 2001; 24 years ago

Services
Preceding station	Utah Transit Authority	Following station
Stadium toward University Medical Center	Red Line	Trolley toward Daybreak Parkway
Former services
Preceding station	Utah Transit Authority	Following station
Stadium toward University Medical Center	Sandy/University Line	Trolley toward Sandy Civic Center
Trolley toward Salt Lake Central	University Line	Stadium toward University Medical Center
Proposed services
Preceding station	Utah Transit Authority	Following station
Stadium toward Arapeen	Orange Line	Trolley toward Airport
Location

900 East (Note: In about 2012 UTA began frequently referring to this station as 900 East & 400 South, presumably to reduce possible confusion with a stop on the newly completed S Line also located just off 900 East, but about eighteen blocks further south. However, the streetcar stop was later designated as Sugarmont.) is a light rail station in the Central City neighborhood of Salt Lake City, Utah, United States serviced by the Red Line of the Utah Transit Authority's (UTA) TRAX light rail system. The Red Line provides service from the University of Utah to the Daybreak community in South Jordan.

== Description ==
The station is located at 875 East 400 South (East University Boulevard/SR-186), with the island platform being in the median of 400 South. As part of the UTA's Art in Transit program, the station features a sculpture of stainless steel and recycled bicycle wheels created by Stuart Keeler and Michael Machnic entitled The Place Between. Unlike most TRAX stations, 900 East does not have a Park and Ride lot. The station is part of a railway right of way that was created specifically for the former University Line. The station was opened on 15 December 2001 as part of the former University Line and is operated by the Utah Transit Authority.
