= Old GreekTown station =

Light rail station in Salt Lake City, Utah, United States

Old GreekTown
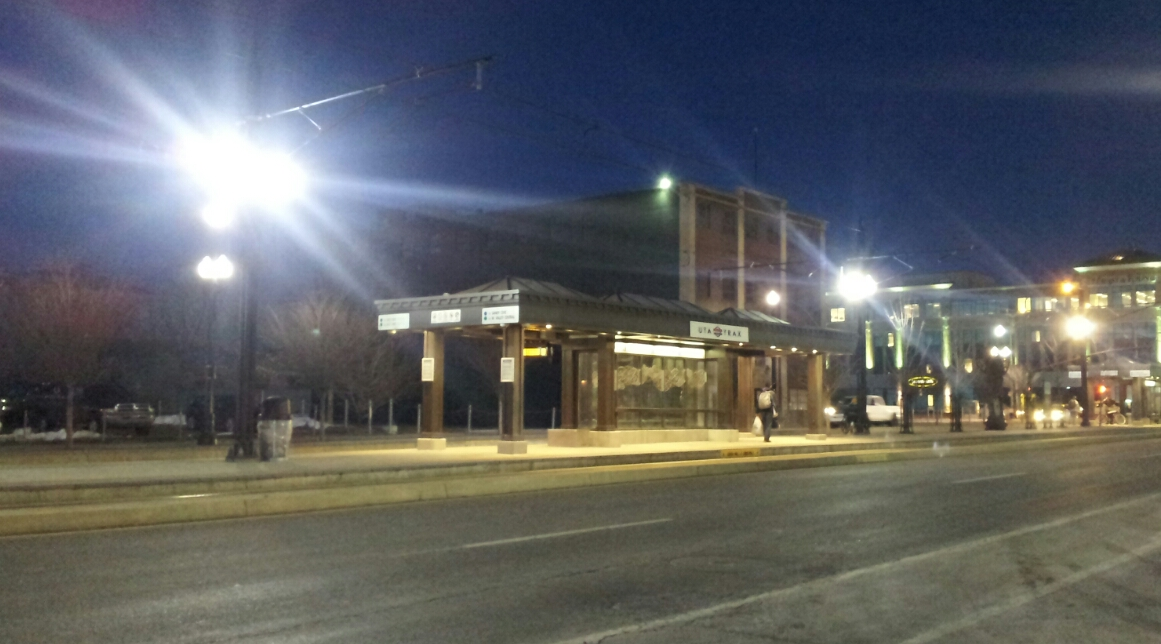
- Old GreekTown station platform

General information
- Location: 550 West 200 South; Salt Lake City, Utah; United States
- Coordinates: 40°45′54″N 111°54′20″W
- Owner: Utah Transit Authority (UTA)
- Platforms: 1 island platform
- Tracks: 2
- Connections: UTA: 2, 209, 220, 509, 513, On Demand Salt Lake City Westside

Construction
- Structure type: At-grade
- Accessible: Yes

Other information
- Fare zone: Free Fare Zone

History
- Opened: April 27, 2008; 18 years ago

Services
Preceding station	Utah Transit Authority	Following station
Salt Lake Central Terminus	Blue Line	Planetarium toward Draper Town Center
Former services
Preceding station	Utah Transit Authority	Following station
Salt Lake Central Terminus	Green Line	Planetarium toward West Valley Central
Salt Lake Central Terminus	University Line	Planetarium toward University Medical Center
Location

Old GreekTown station is light rail station in Downtown Salt Lake City, Utah, United States serviced by the Blue Line of the Utah Transit Authority's (UTA) TRAX system. The Blue Line has service from the Salt Lake Intermodal Hub in Downtown Salt Lake City to Draper. For several years prior the opening of the Airport Extension, it was also on the route of the Green Line.

== Description ==
The station is located at 550 West 200 South with the island platform in the median of the street. The buildings facing onto this segment of 200 South are mostly old buildings now occupied by retail businesses, though many of them, such as the historic Central Warehouse, were built in a time when the area was nearly surrounded by rail yards and freight spurs. There is also newly built transit-oriented development on the street. The historic Rio Grande Station (now housing a museum) is a half-block south. The station opened on April 27, 2008 and is operated by the Utah Transit Authority. It is one of three additional stations that extended TRAX from Arena Station to the Intermodal Hub in 2008. The station is included in the Free Fare Zone in Downtown Salt Lake City. Transportation patrons that both enter and exit bus or TRAX service within the Zone can ride at no charge. Unlike many TRAX stations, Old GreekTown does not have a Park and Ride lot.
