= Trolley station (Utah Transit Authority) =

Light rail station in Salt Lake City, Utah, United States

Trolley
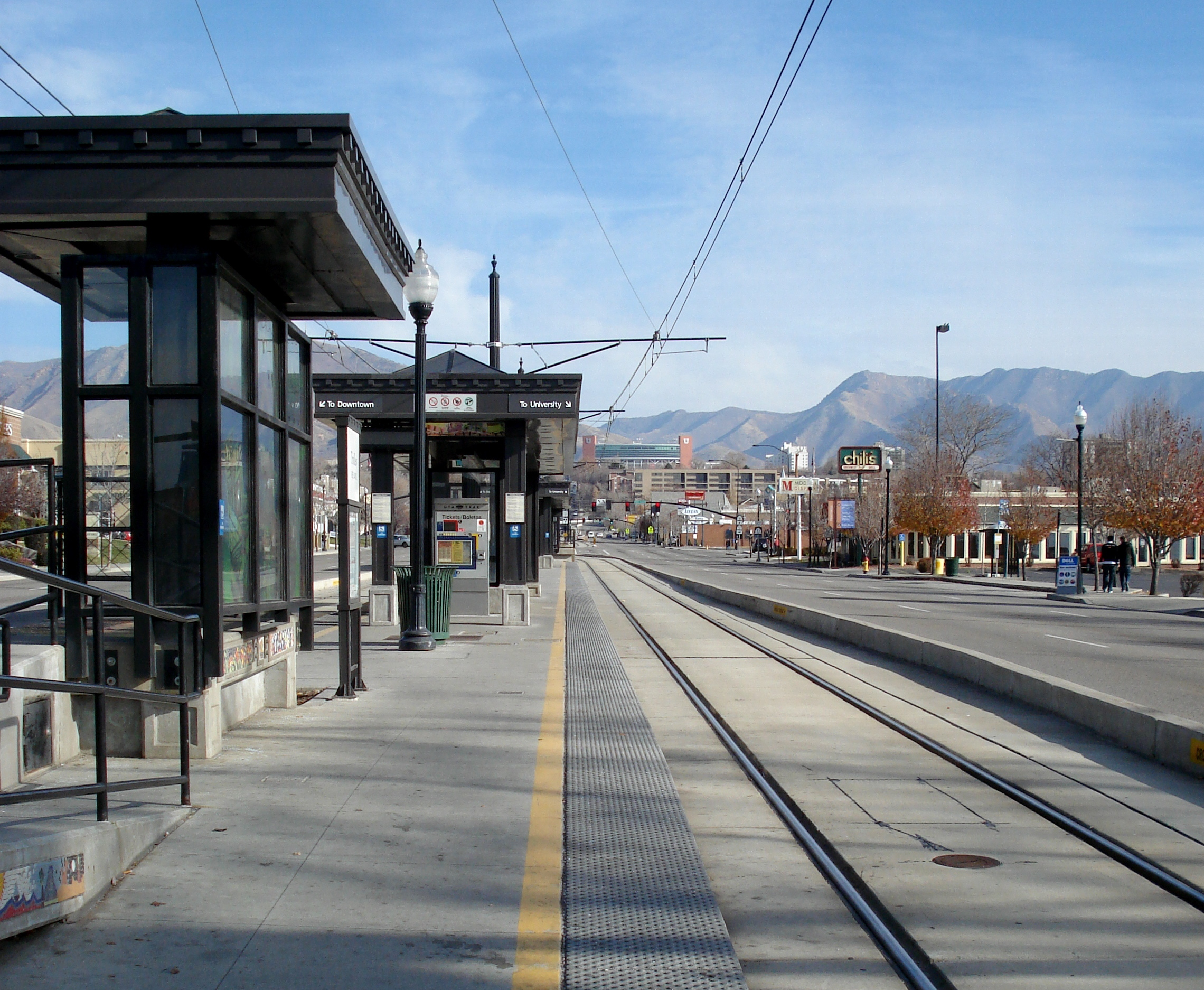
- Trolley station platform

General information
- Location: 625 East 400 South (East University Boulevard); Salt Lake City, Utah; United States
- Coordinates: 40.76070°N 111.87322°W
- Owner: Utah Transit Authority (UTA)
- Platforms: 1 island platform
- Tracks: 2
- Connections: UTA: 4, 455

Construction
- Structure type: At-grade
- Accessible: Yes

History
- Opened: December 15, 2001; 24 years ago

Services
Preceding station	Utah Transit Authority	Following station
900 East toward University Medical Center	Red Line	Library toward Daybreak Parkway
Former services
Preceding station	Utah Transit Authority	Following station
900 East toward University Medical Center	Sandy/University Line	Library toward Sandy Civic Center
Library toward Salt Lake Central	University Line	900 East toward University Medical Center
Proposed services
Preceding station	Utah Transit Authority	Following station
900 East toward Arapeen	Orange Line	Library toward Airport
Location

Trolley station is a light rail station in the Central City neighborhood of Salt Lake City, Utah, United States serviced by the Red Line of the Utah Transit Authority's (UTA) TRAX light rail system. The Red Line provides service from the University of Utah to the Daybreak community of South Jordan.

== Description ==
The station is located at 625 East 400 South (East University Boulevard/SR-186), with the island platform being in the median of 400 South. The vicinity of the station is characterized by intensive and diverse retail development, including supermarkets and the mall in historic Trolley Square (which is one block south), though substantial office buildings and residential areas are also nearby. As part of the UTA's Art in Transit program, the station features tile mosaics, granite pavers, color laminated glass windscreens and steel created by Paul Heath, Victoria Lyons, Michael Moonbird, and Valerie Parker Price collectively entitled Bad Dog Community Art Station. Unlike most TRAX stations, Trolley does not have a Park and Ride lot. The station is part of a railway right of way that was created specifically for the former University Line. The station was opened on 15 December 2001 as part of the University Line and is operated by the Utah Transit Authority.
