= Trolley Square =

Shopping mall in Salt Lake City, Utah

- Location: 602 E 500 S Salt Lake City, Utah; United States 84102
- Coordinates: 40.7573°N 111.8721°W
- Opened: 1972
- Website: www.trolleysquare.com

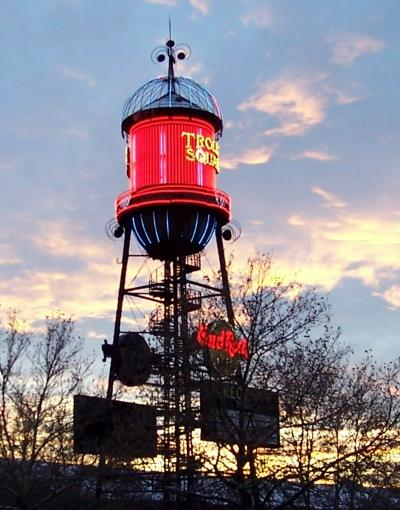
Weather forecast tower at Trolley Square

Trolley Square is a partially enclosed shopping center located in Salt Lake City, Utah, United States. It is considered to be a trendy high-end center. The center is near downtown Salt Lake City and the UTA TRAX light-rail system.

== History ==
=== Description ===
Trolley Square is composed of barns that were built in 1908 to house Salt Lake City's streetcars. The streetcar system was dismantled in 1945, and the barns were converted into a two-story shopping center in 1972. The center is noted for its unusual architecture consisting of winding hallways, brick and wooden floors, fountains, old-trees, and wrought-iron balconies. Prominent tenants include Weller Book Works, Pottery Barn, Cabin Fever (a popular card store), Williams Sonoma, Old Spaghetti Factory, The Desert Edge Brewery at the Pub, The Spectacle, and local boutiques. The mall historically was home to a four-screen cinema and an amusement arcade.

The Trolley Square Water Tower is a 97-foot water tower that is a prominent feature of the Salt Lake City skyline, and can be spotted from miles away at night. The Tower originally held 50,000 gallons of water, and was used to supply the sprinkler system for the trolley barns. In 1972, it was converted into a landmark, and covered in red and blue neon lights. For many years, the tower was a weather beacon, giving the local weather forecast based on the colors of lights, with solid blue being fair weather, flashing blue being overcast, solid red being rain, and flashing red being snow. The Trolley Square Water Tower was renovated in fall 2014, and offers guided tours on its observation deck for guests. During the renovation, the neon lights were removed - and were subsequently replaced with LED light strips which allowed for a wider spectrum of color availability. While the Tower coloration is seemingly no longer used to display the weather forecast, different colors are now used decoratively during different seasons, holidays, or events.

Another prominent feature of Trolley Square is the sky bridge that connects the main building to a small parking lot located across the street. The bridge was made from a salvaged ore conveyor bridge formerly in use at the International Smelting and Refining Company facility in Tooele, Utah. The bridge goes over 600 South, and it features neon lights shaped in the form of a trolley.

=== 2007 shooting ===
The Trolley Square shooting was a mass shooting that occurred on the evening of February 12, 2007 at the mall. A lone gunman, identified as Sulejman Talović, killed five bystanders and wounded four others before being shot dead by several members of the Salt Lake City Police Department. Authorities were not able to determine a motive.

=== Location Influence ===
Trolley Square is one of Salt Lake City's most popular tourist attractions. The Trolley Square Water Tower is also a prominent landmark in the area. The nearby "Trolley Station" of the UTA TRAX is named after Trolley Square.
