= Olympic Sports Center =

Olympic Sports Center may refer to:

- Olympic Sports Centre (Beijing)
- Chongqing Olympic Sports Center
- Jinan Olympic Sports Center
- Nanjing Olympic Sports Center
  - Nanjing Olympic Sports Center Gymnasium
- Olympic Sports Centre, Riga
- Shenyang Olympic Sports Center Stadium

== See also ==
- Olympic Sports Center station (disambiguation)
