= Arena station =

Arena station may refer to:

- Arena station (Buffalo Metro Rail), a light rail station in Buffalo, New York, renamed Special Events station
- Arena station (Utah Transit Authority), a light rail station in Salt Lake City, Utah
- Amsterdam Bijlmer ArenA station, a railway, metro and bus station in Amsterdam, Netherlands
- Baltimore Arena station, a light rail station in Baltimore, Maryland
- Benchmark International Arena station, a streetcar stop in Tampa, Florida
- Coventry Arena railway station, a railway station in Coventry, England
- Dome/GWCC/Philips Arena/CNN Center station, a metro station in Atlanta, Georgia
- Joe Louis Arena station, a People Mover station in Detroit, Michigan
- Kaohsiung Arena MRT station, a metro station in Kaohsiung, Taiwan
- Metro Ferrería/Arena Ciudad de México, a metro station in Azcapotzalco, Mexico City
- Taipei Arena MRT station, a metro station in Taipei, Taiwan
- Crossharbour DLR station, a light rail station in London, England, that was named Crossharbour and London Arena station from 1994 to 2006
- Charlotte Transportation Center, an intermodal transit station in Charlotte, North Carolina, also known as Arena station or CTC/Arena station

== See also ==
- Stadium station (disambiguation)
