= Stadium station (Utah Transit Authority) =

Light rail station in Salt Lake City, Utah, US

Stadium
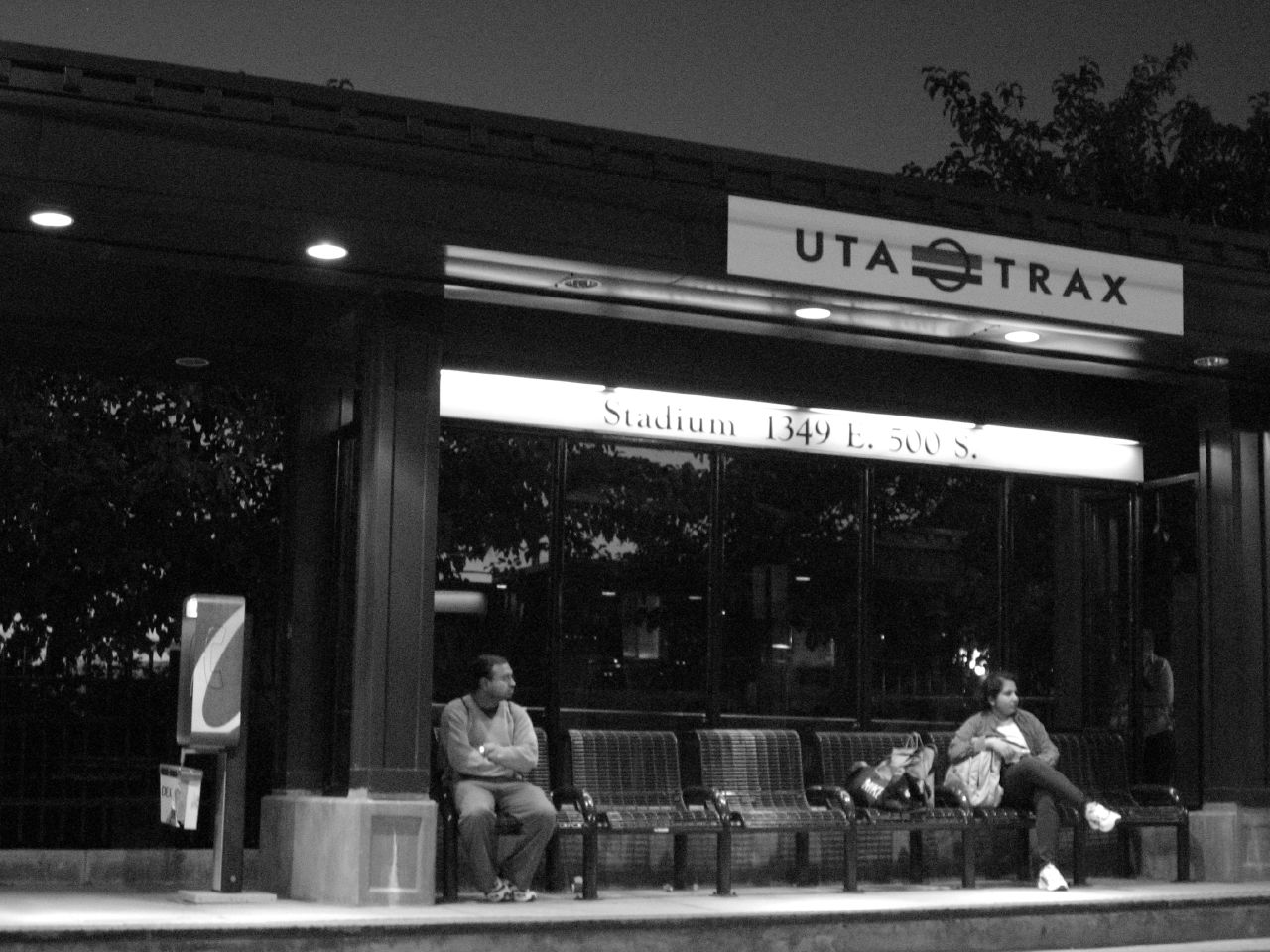
- Passengers waiting on the Stadium station platform

General information
- Location: 1349 East 500 South (East University Boulevard); Salt Lake City, Utah; United States
- Coordinates: 40°45′34.98″N 111°51′7.74″W
- Owner: Utah Transit Authority (UTA)
- Platforms: 2 side platforms
- Tracks: 2
- Connections: UTA: 4, 213, 220, 455, 473

Construction
- Structure type: At-grade
- Accessible: Yes

History
- Opened: December 15, 2001; 24 years ago

Services
Preceding station	Utah Transit Authority	Following station
University South Campus toward University Medical Center	Red Line	900 East toward Daybreak Parkway
Former services
Preceding station	Utah Transit Authority	Following station
University South Campus toward University Medical Center	Sandy/University Line	900 East toward Sandy Civic Center
900 East toward Salt Lake Central	University Line	University South Campus toward University Medical Center
Proposed services
Preceding station	Utah Transit Authority	Following station
University South Campus toward Arapeen	Orange Line	900 East toward Airport
Location

Stadium station is a light rail station serving the Rice–Eccles Stadium on the campus of the University of Utah in Salt Lake City, Utah, United States, served by the Red Line of the Utah Transit Authority's (UTA) TRAX light rail system. The Red Line provides a service from the University of Utah Medical Center to the Daybreak community of South Jordan.

== Description ==
The address listed by UTA for the station is 1349 East 500 South (East University Boulevard/SR-186). However, the station's two side platforms are actually located immediately east of a one-way (southbound only) section of University Street (SR-282). The station is accessible from both 400 South and 500 South, but not University Street (except at the two previously indicated streets).

Situated on the western edge of the University of Utah Campus, the station is just west of the university's Rice–Eccles Stadium with the stadium's parking lot in between. Like the station itself, the stadium was originally built for the 2002 Winter Olympics, where it served as the site of the Opening and Closing ceremonies, a role it is expected reprise for the 2034 Winter Olympics.

The area west of the station is older residential housing; southeast of the station is the Mount Olivet Cemetery.

As part of the UTA's Art in Transit program, the station features a woven bronze sculpture created by Michael Stutz entitled Flame Figure. Installed in December 2001, the sculpture was commissioned by the Salt Lake City Arts Council to commemorate the 2002 Winter Olympics.

Unlike most TRAX stations, Stadium does not have a Park and Ride lot. The station is part of a railway right of way that was created specifically for the University Line. The station was opened on December 15, 2001 a few weeks ahead of the 2002 Olympics.

== History ==
Following the approval of federal funding in February 2000, construction of the [former] University Line commenced on August 7, 2000. The naming of the station Stadium (due to its proximity to Rice–Eccles Stadium) was made official by the UTA Board on April 25, 2001. The station opened as one of the four new TRAX stations included as part of the University Line.

Stadium Station served as the eastern terminus of the University Line from its completion through the opening of a three-station expansion further east on September 29, 2003; the University Medical Center presently serves as the eastern terminus.
