= Fort Douglas (disambiguation) =

Fort Douglas may refer to:

- Fort Douglas (Canada), a Hudson's Bay Company fort near Winnipeg, Manitoba
- Fort Douglas, Utah, a former U.S. Army fort in Salt Lake City, Utah
  - Fort Douglas (UTA station), a transit station at the site of the former fort
