= Library station (Utah Transit Authority) =

Light rail station in Salt Lake City, Utah, United States

Library
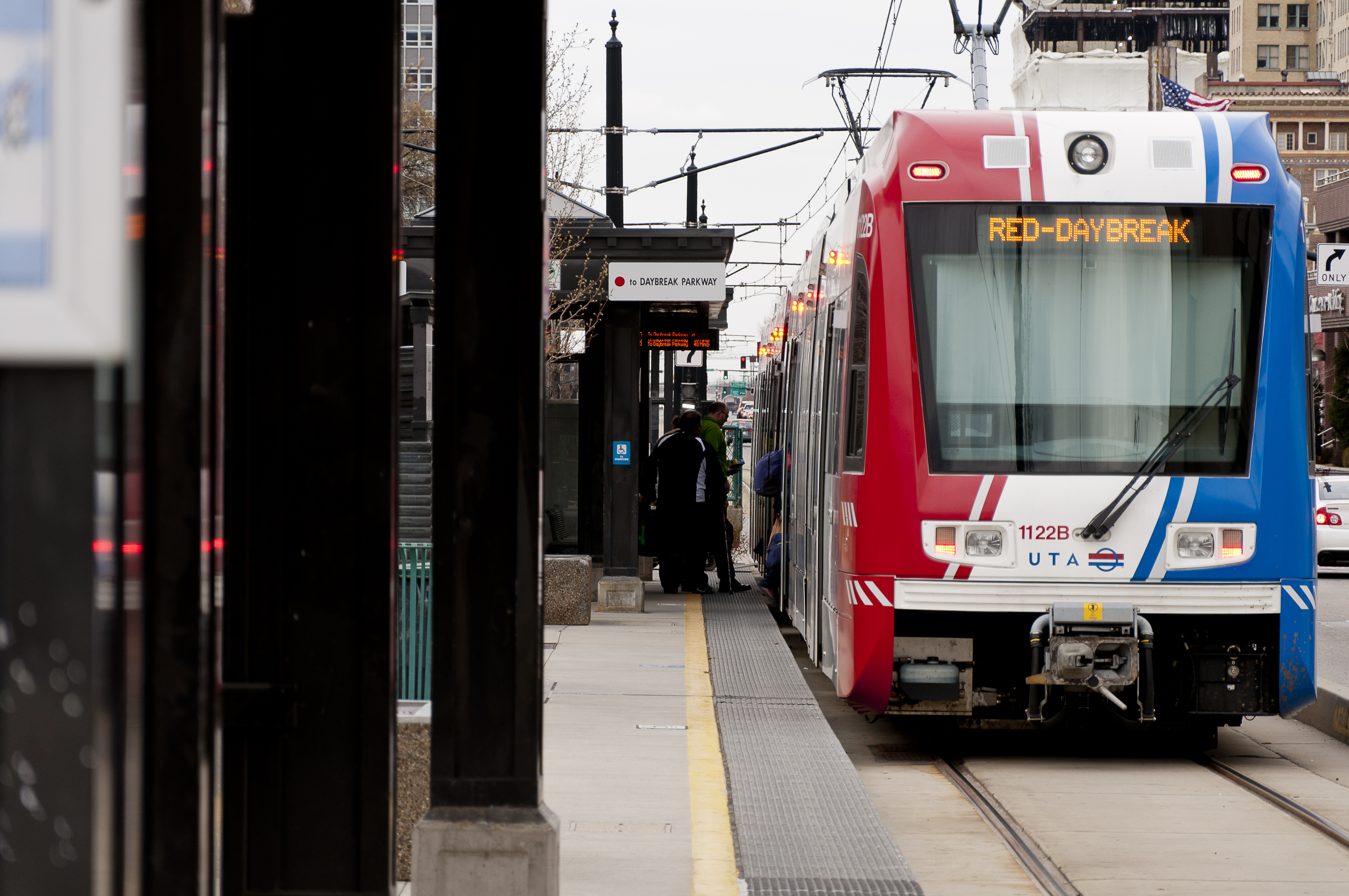
- Library station platform

General information
- Location: 225 East 400 South (University Boulevard); Salt Lake City, Utah; United States
- Coordinates: 40.76063°N 111.88442°W
- Owner: Utah Transit Authority (UTA)
- Platforms: 1 island platform
- Tracks: 2
- Connections: UTA: 4, 455, 473

Construction
- Structure type: At-grade
- Cycle facilities: Greenbike bikeshare station, 4 lockers
- Accessible: Yes

Other information
- Fare zone: Free Fare Zone

History
- Opened: December 15, 2001; 24 years ago

Services
Preceding station	Utah Transit Authority	Following station
Trolley toward University Medical Center	Red Line	Courthouse toward Daybreak Parkway
Former services
Preceding station	Utah Transit Authority	Following station
Trolley toward University Medical Center	Sandy/University Line	Gallivan Plaza toward Sandy Civic Center
Gallivan Plaza toward Salt Lake Central	University Line	Trolley toward University Medical Center
Proposed services
Preceding station	Utah Transit Authority	Following station
Trolley toward University Medical Center	Red Line	West Temple toward Daybreak Parkway
Trolley toward Arapeen	Orange Line	West Temple toward Airport
Location

Library station is a light rail station in Downtown Salt Lake City, Utah, United States serviced by the Red Line of the Utah Transit Authority's (UTA) TRAX light rail system. The Red Line provides service from the University of Utah to the Daybreak community of South Jordan.

== Description ==
The station is located at 225 East 400 South (East University Boulevard/SR-186), with the island platform being in the median of 400 South. It is situated immediately north of the main Salt Lake City Public Library building and northwest of the Salt Lake City and County Building. Library is the last eastbound station within the Free Fare Zone in Downtown Salt Lake City. Transportation patrons that both enter and exit bus or TRAX service within the Zone can ride at no charge. (Note: When initially built, Library Station was not included in the Free Fare Zone. However, as Salt Lake City's advocate indicated, the original planned Library Station was within the six square blocks of the zone, but due to traffic flow concerns was moved just east of the zone. Because of this, and other reasons, Library Station was finally included in the Free Fare Zone.) As part of the UTA's Art in Transit program, the station features cast bronze books and etched glass windscreens created by Gregg LeFevre entitled By Its Cover. Unlike most TRAX stations, Library does not have a Park and Ride lot. The station is part of a railway right of way that was created specifically for the former University Line. The station was opened on 15 December 2001 as part of the University Line and is operated by the Utah Transit Authority.

Like the Salt Lake Intermodal Hub (as well as City Center and Gallivan Plaza), there is a nearby Greenbike docking station. Greenbike is a bicycle-sharing system within Downtown Salt Lake City that allows members to pick up bicycles from any docking station and then drop it off at any docking station, ideally for trips of 60 minutes or less to avoid additional charges.

== History ==
On May 30, 2020, the station was heavily vandalized when a Black Lives Matter demonstration turned violent. Virtually all the windows on the pedestrian shelter were broken and the shelter frame and concrete were riddled with anti-police slogans. Some of the steel cable barriers separating the right of way from the street were bent, and various police departments used the area as a staging ground later in the day. Most of the damage was repaired by volunteers the following morning.
