= Stadium station =

Stadium station may refer to:

- Stadium station (Edmonton), a light rail station in Edmonton, Alberta, Canada
- Stadium (Dubai Metro), a rapid transit station in Dubai, United Arab Emirates
- Stadium station (Macau Light Rapid Transit), a rapid transit station in Macau
- Stadium station (MetroLink), a light rail station in St. Louis, Missouri, United States
- Stadium station (Sound Transit), a light rail station in Seattle, Washington, United States
- Stadium station (San Diego), a light rail station in San Diego, California, United States
- Stadium station (Utah Transit Authority), a light rail station in Salt Lake City, Utah, United States
- Stadium–Armory station, a rapid transit station in Washington, D.C., United States
- Stadium–Chinatown station, a rapid transit station in Vancouver, British Columbia, Canada
- Stadium–Ithan Avenue station, a rapid transit station in Radnor Township, Pennsylvania, United States, formerly named Stadium station
- Stadium/Federal Hill station, a light rail station in Baltimore, Maryland, United States, formerly named Hamburg Street station
- Stadium MRT station, a rapid transit station on the Circle line in Singapore
- National Stadium BTS station, a rapid transit station in Bangkok, Thailand
- Perth Stadium railway station, a suburban railway station in Burswood, Western Australia, Australia
- Stadium station (MBTA), a former subway station in Cambridge, Massachusetts, United States

== See also ==
- Olympic Stadium station (disambiguation)
- Arena station (disambiguation)
- Stadion station
