= Planetarium station =

Light rail station in Salt Lake City, Utah, United States

Planetarium
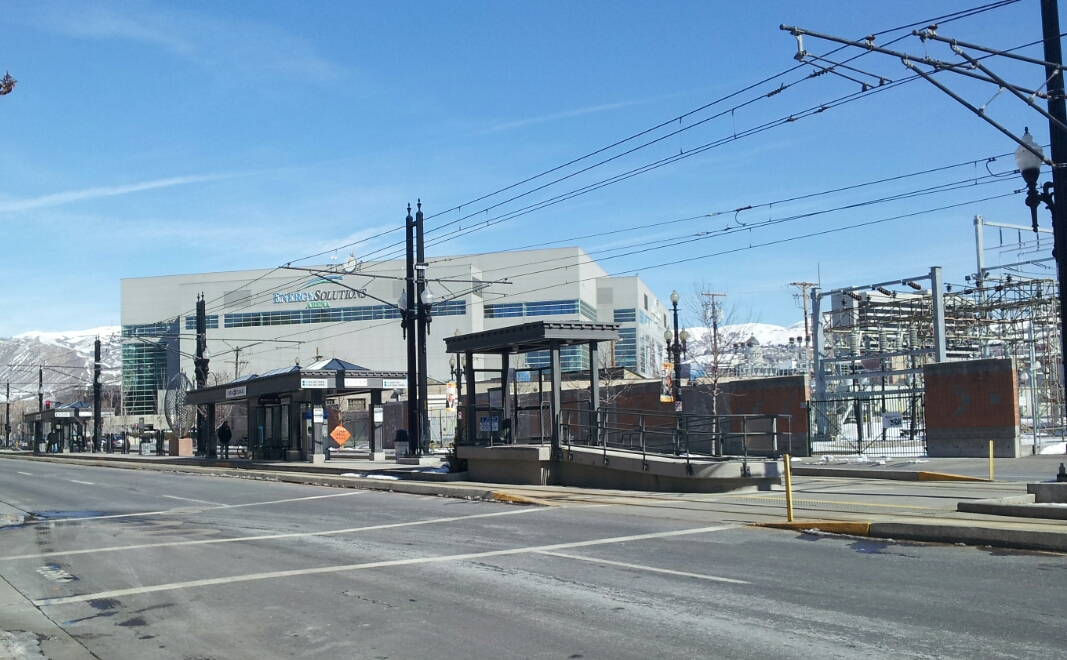
- Planetarium station platform as seen from The Gateway looking towards Vivint Arena

General information
- Location: 150 South 400 West; Salt Lake City, Utah; United States
- Coordinates: 40°45′59″N 111°54′09″W
- Owner: Utah Transit Authority (UTA)
- Platforms: 1 island platform
- Tracks: 2
- Connections: UTA: On Demand Salt Lake City Westside

Construction
- Structure type: At-grade
- Accessible: Yes

Other information
- Fare zone: Free Fare Zone

History
- Opened: April 27, 2008; 18 years ago

Services
Preceding station	Utah Transit Authority	Following station
Old Greek Town toward Salt Lake Central	Blue Line	Arena toward Draper Town Center
Former services
Preceding station	Utah Transit Authority	Following station
Old Greek Town toward Salt Lake Central	Green Line	Arena toward West Valley Central
Old Greek Town toward Salt Lake Central	University Line	Arena toward University Medical Center
Proposed services
Preceding station	Utah Transit Authority	Following station
Old Greek Town toward Salt Lake Central	Green Line	Arena toward West Valley Central
Arena toward Airport	Orange Line	300 S toward Arapeen
Location

Planetarium station is a light rail station in Downtown Salt Lake City, Utah, in the United States, served by the Blue Line of the Utah Transit Authority's (UTA) TRAX system. The Blue Line has service from the Salt Lake Intermodal Hub in Downtown Salt Lake City to Draper. For several years before the Airport Extension was opened, it was also on the route of the Green Line.

== Description ==
The station is at 150 South 400 West with the island platform in the median of the street. It is immediately east of the Clark Planetarium and the rest of The Gateway, as well as southwest of the Vivint Smart Home Arena. The station opened on April 27, 2008, and is operated by the Utah Transit Authority. It is one of three additional stations that extended TRAX from Arena Station to the Intermodal Hub in 2008. The station is included in the Free Fare Zone in Downtown Salt Lake City. Transportation patrons that both enter and exit bus or TRAX service within the Zone can ride at no charge. Unlike many TRAX stations, Planetarium does not have a Park and Ride lot.

All of UTA's TRAX and FrontRunner trains and stations, as well as all fixed route buses, are compliant with Americans with Disabilities Act and are therefore accessible to those with disabilities. Signage at the stations, on the passenger platforms, and on the trains clearly indicate accessibility options. Ramps on the passenger platform and assistance from the train operator may be necessary for wheelchair boarding on Blue Line (weekdays only). These ramps are not used on weekends or on the Green Line. In accordance with the Utah Clean Air Act and UTA ordinance, "smoking is prohibited on UTA vehicles as well as UTA bus stops, TRAX stations, and FrontRunner stations".
