= Central Warehouse (Salt Lake City) =

Historic building in Salt Lake City, Utah, United States

- U.S. National Register of Historic Places
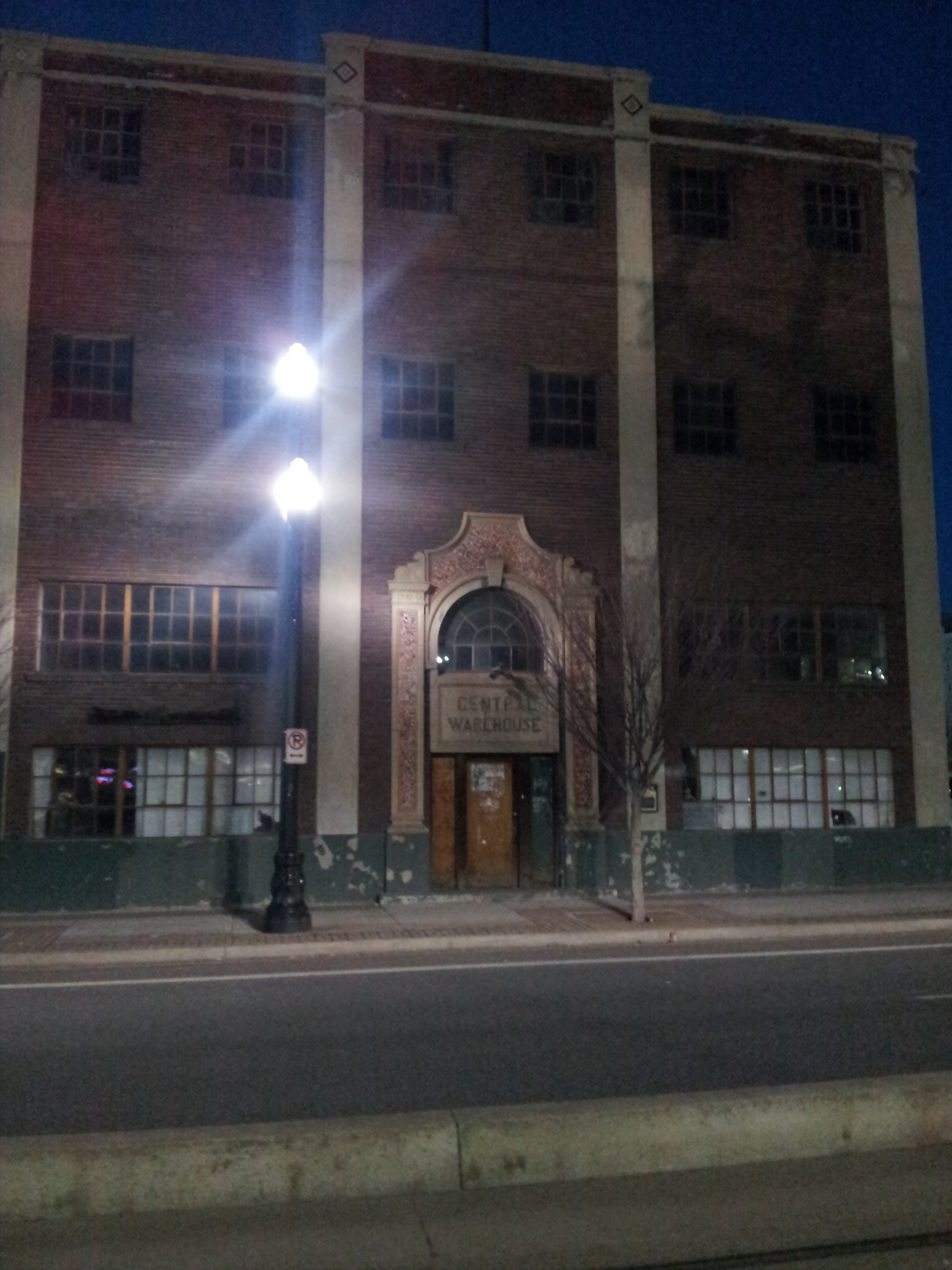
- Central Warehouse at night as seen from the Old GreekTown TRAX station, February 2013

- Location within Utah Location within the United States
- Location: 520 West 200 South; Salt Lake City, Utah; United States
- Coordinates: 40°45′55″N 111°54′20″W
- Area: 0 acres (0 ha)
- Built: 1929
- MPS: Salt Lake City Business District MRA
- NRHP reference No.: 82004136
- Added to NRHP: August 17, 1982

Central Warehouse is a small warehouse in Salt Lake City, Utah, United States, that is listed on the National Register of Historic Places (NRHP).

== Description ==
The warehouse was built in 1929 for George E. Chandler. The architectural design, construction technique, and its historic integrity make this structure one of the best examples of a warehouse in the city. It was listed on the NRHP August 17, 1982. The Old GreekTown station served by Utah Transit Authority's TRAX light rail trains in the middle of the street (200 south) in front of it.

== See also ==
- National Register of Historic Places listings in Salt Lake City
