= Fort Douglas station =

Light rail station in Salt Lake City, Utah, United States

Fort Douglas
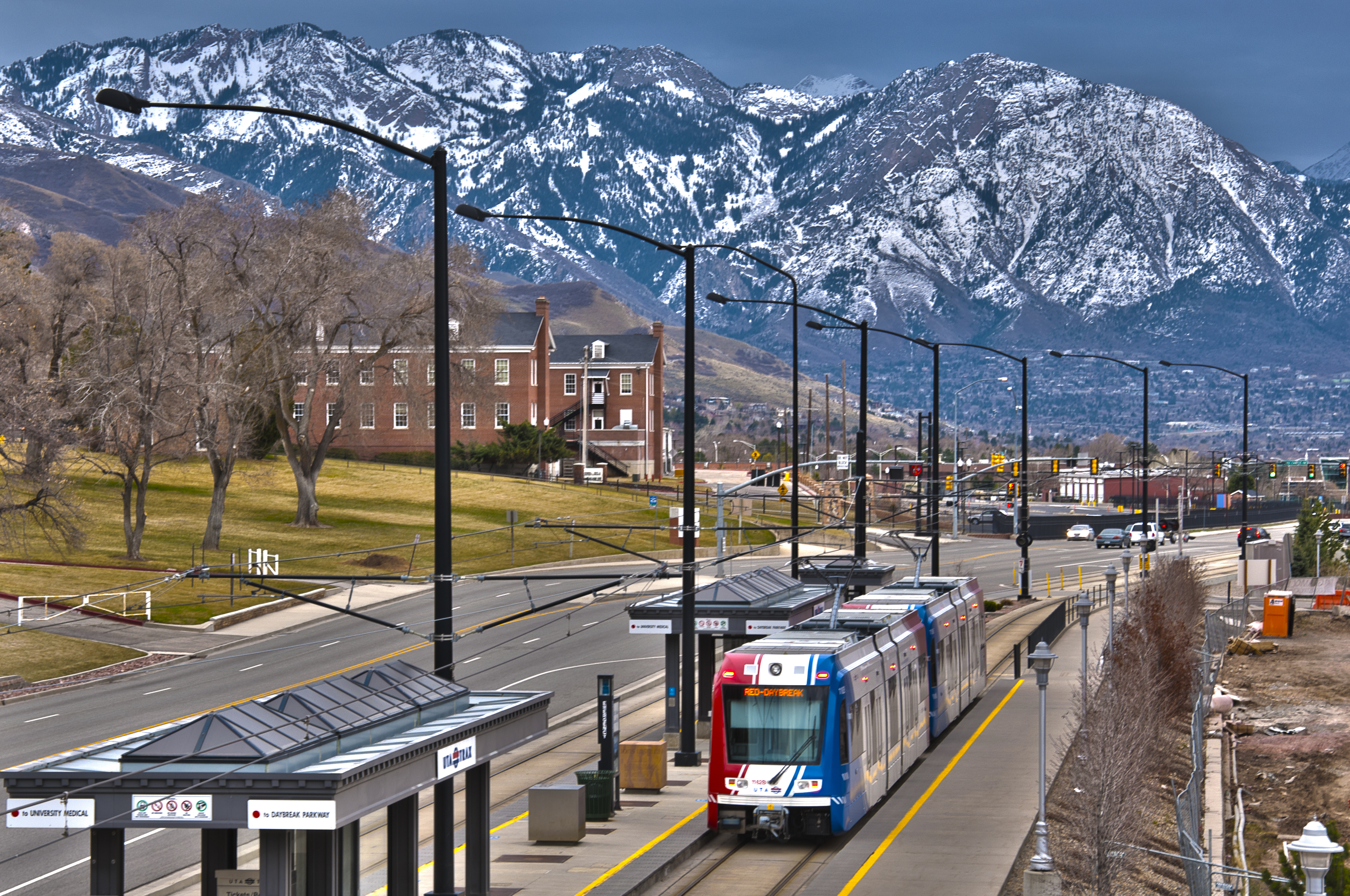
- A Red Line train at Fort Douglas station with the Wasatch Range in the background

General information
- Location: 200 South Mario Capecchi Drive; Salt Lake City, Utah; United States
- Coordinates: 40°45′52″N 111°50′12″W
- Owner: Utah Transit Authority (UTA)
- Platforms: 1 island platform, 1 side platform
- Tracks: 2

Construction
- Structure type: At-grade
- Accessible: Yes

History
- Opened: September 29, 2003; 22 years ago

Services
Preceding station	Utah Transit Authority	Following station
University Medical Center Terminus	Red Line	University South Campus toward Daybreak Parkway
Former services
Preceding station	Utah Transit Authority	Following station
University Medical Center Terminus	Sandy/University Line	University South Campus toward Sandy Civic Center
University South Campus toward Salt Lake Central	University Line	University Medical Center Terminus
Location

Fort Douglas station is a light rail station named after the nearby Fort Douglas and on the campus of the University of Utah in Salt Lake City, Utah, in the United States, served by the Red Line of the Utah Transit Authority's (UTA) TRAX light rail system. The Red Line provides service from the University of Utah Medical Center to the Daybreak community of South Jordan.

== Description ==
The station is located on the campus of the University of Utah at 200 South Mario Capecchi Drive (formerly called Wasatch Drive), with the island platform situated on the west side of the street. The station was named after the former Fort Douglas army garrison located just east of the station. Unlike many TRAX stations, Fort Douglas does not have a Park and Ride lot. The station is part of a railway right of way that was created specifically for the former University Line. The station opened on September 29, 2003 and is operated by the Utah Transit Authority.
