= University South Campus station =

Light rail station in Salt Lake City, Utah, United States

University South Campus
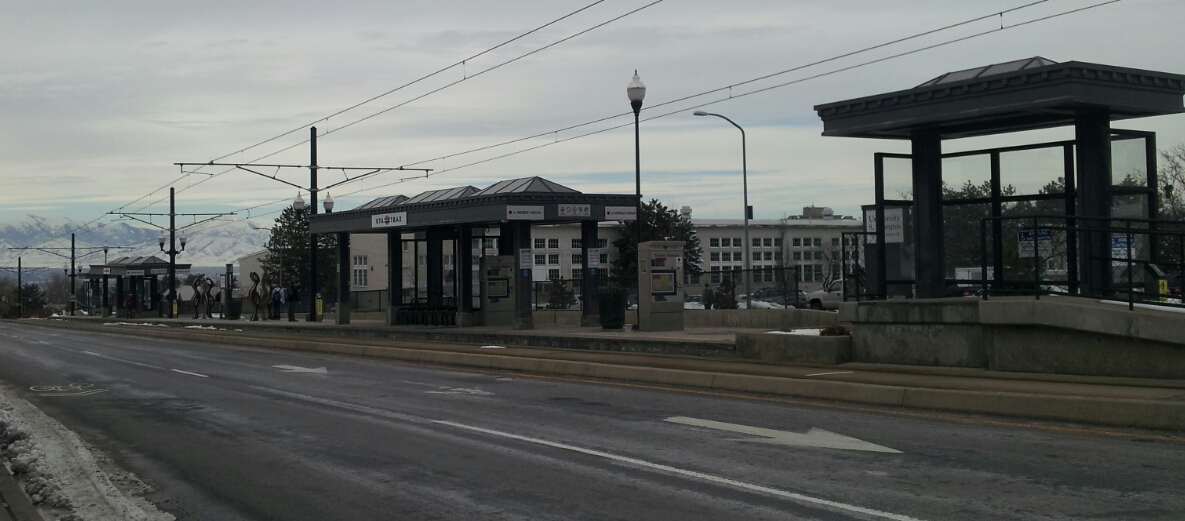
- University South Campus station platform

General information
- Location: 1790 East South Campus Drive; Salt Lake City, Utah; United States
- Coordinates: 40°45′37.02″N 111°50′22.28″W
- Owner: Utah Transit Authority (UTA)
- Platforms: 1 island platform
- Tracks: 2
- Connections: UTA: 9, 17, 213, 455, 473

Construction
- Structure type: At-grade
- Parking: Paid parking nearby
- Accessible: Yes

History
- Opened: September 29, 2003; 22 years ago

Services
Preceding station	Utah Transit Authority	Following station
Fort Douglas toward University Medical Center	Red Line	Stadium toward Daybreak Parkway
Former services
Preceding station	Utah Transit Authority	Following station
Fort Douglas toward University Medical Center	Sandy/University Line	Stadium toward Sandy Civic Center
Stadium toward Salt Lake Central	University Line	Fort Douglas toward University Medical Center
Proposed services
Preceding station	Utah Transit Authority	Following station
Mario Capecchi toward Arapeen	Orange Line	Stadium toward Airport
Location

University South Campus station, often referred to as simply South Campus station, is a light rail station on the campus of the University of Utah in Salt Lake City, Utah, United States serviced by the Red Line of the Utah Transit Authority's (UTA) TRAX light rail system. The Red Line provides service from the University of Utah Medical Center to the Daybreak community of South Jordan.

== Description ==
The station is located on the campus of the University of Utah at 1790 East South Campus Drive with the island platform situated in the middle of that street. Northeast of the station is the Jon M. Huntsman Center and immediately south of the station is the LDS Institute of the Church of Jesus Christ of Latter-day Saints (LDS Church). Unlike many TRAX stations, University South Campus does not have a Park and Ride lot, however, the Church of Jesus Christ of Latter-day Saints allows parking at the Institute parking garage southeast of the station for those who purchase a $22.00 Transit Parking Pass. The station is part of a railway right of way that was created specifically for the former University Line. The station opened on 29 September 2003 and is operated by the Utah Transit Authority.
