= Courthouse station (Utah Transit Authority) =

Light rail station in Salt Lake City, Utah, US

Courthouse
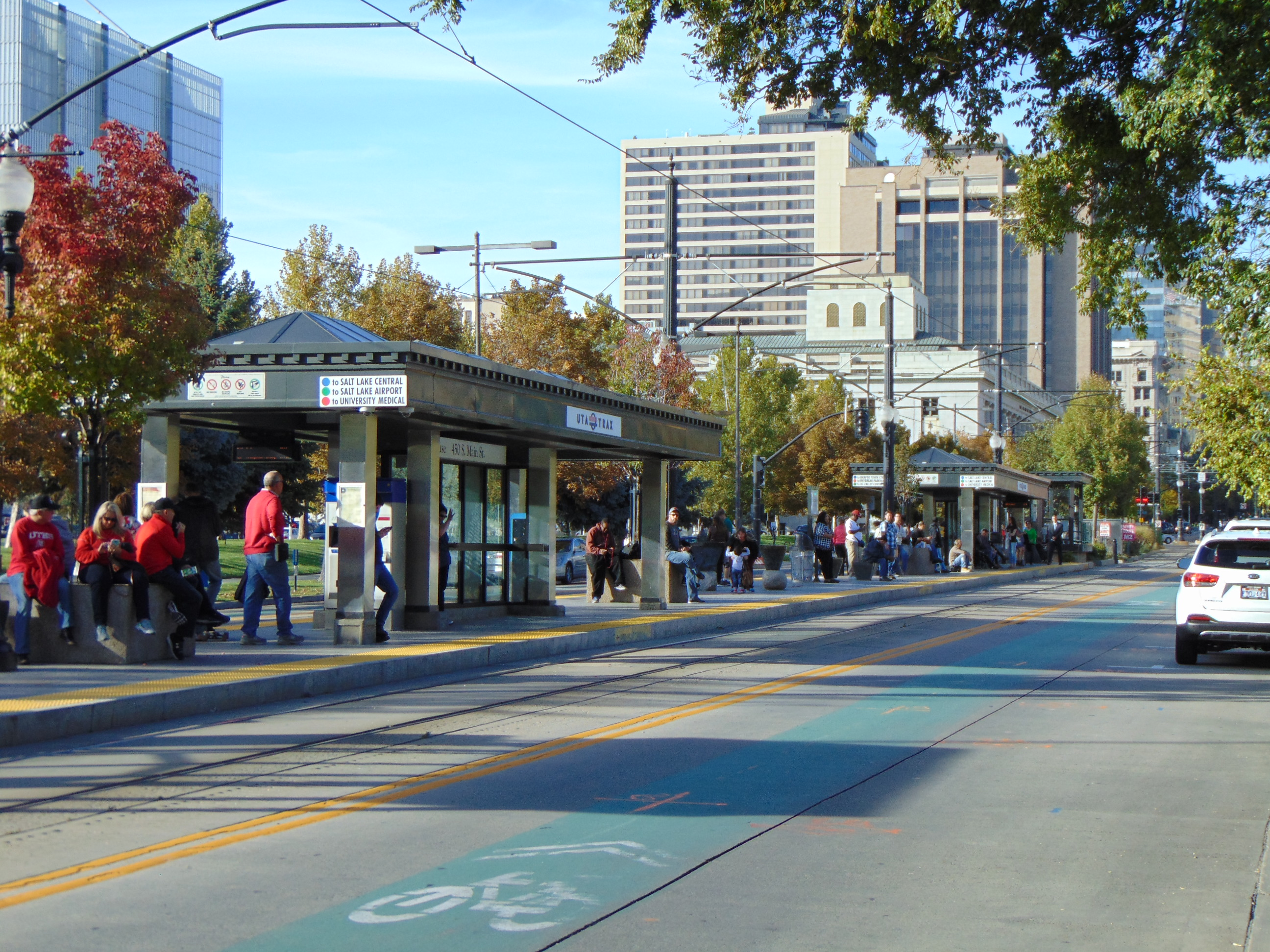
- Courthouse station platform

General information
- Location: 450 South Main Street; Salt Lake City, Utah; United States
- Coordinates: 40°45′34″N 111°53′28″W
- Owner: Utah Transit Authority (UTA)
- Platforms: 1 island platform
- Tracks: 2
- Connections: UTA: 451

Construction
- Structure type: At-grade
- Accessible: Yes

Other information
- Fare zone: Free Fare Zone

History
- Opened: December 4, 1999; 26 years ago

Services
Preceding station	Utah Transit Authority	Following station
Gallivan Plaza toward Salt Lake Central	Blue Line	600 South toward Draper Town Center
Library toward University Medical Center	Red Line	600 South toward Daybreak Parkway
Gallivan Plaza toward Airport	Green Line	600 South toward West Valley Central
Former services
Preceding station	Utah Transit Authority	Following station
Library toward University Medical Center	Sandy/University Line	900 South toward Sandy Civic Center
Location

Courthouse station (Note: Sometimes the name of the station is mistakenly listed as "Court House", even occasionally by UTA itself) is a light rail station in Downtown Salt Lake City, Utah, United States, serviced by all three lines of Utah Transit Authority's TRAX light rail system. The Blue Line provides service from Downtown Salt Lake City to Draper. The Red Line provides service from the University of Utah to the Daybreak community of South Jordan. The Green Line provides service from the Salt Lake City International Airport to West Valley City (via Downtown Salt Lake City).

== Description ==
The station is located at 450 South Main Street, with the island platform in the median of Main Street. Courthouse Station is so named as it is situated just southeast of the Frank E. Moss United States Courthouse and west of the Scott M. Matheson Courthouse. An area known as Hotel Row, with a large number of hotels and motels, is south and west of the Station. The Station is the last northbound station serviced by all three TRAX lines. The station opened on 4 December 1999 and was part of the first operating segment of the TRAX system. It is operated by the Utah Transit Authority. Courthouse is the last southbound station within the Free Fare Zone in Downtown Salt Lake City. Transportation patrons that both enter and exit bus or TRAX service within the Zone can ride at no charge. Unlike many TRAX stations, Courthouse does not have a Park and Ride lot. The whole block immediately west of the Station is a single large pay-for-parking lot that sometimes hosts special events.
