= Gallivan Plaza station =

Light rail station in Salt Lake City, Utah, United States

Gallivan Plaza
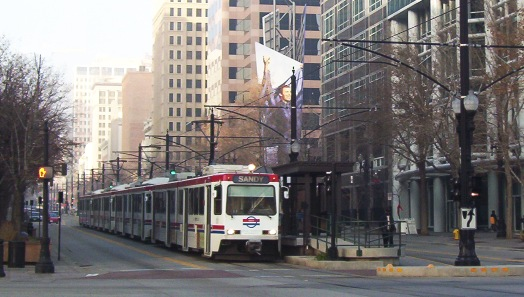
- Train at Gallivan Plaza station platform

General information
- Location: 275 South Main Street; Salt Lake City, Utah; United States
- Coordinates: 40°45′50″N 111°53′28″W
- Owner: Utah Transit Authority (UTA)
- Platforms: 1 island platform
- Tracks: 2
- Connections: UTA: 1, 2, 4, 205, 209, 220; High Valley Transit: 107

Construction
- Structure type: At-grade
- Cycle facilities: Greenbike bikeshare station
- Accessible: Yes

Other information
- Fare zone: Free Fare Zone

History
- Opened: December 4, 1999; 26 years ago

Services
Preceding station	Utah Transit Authority	Following station
City Center toward Salt Lake Central	Blue Line	Courthouse toward Draper Town Center
City Center toward Airport	Green Line	Courthouse toward West Valley Central
Former services
Preceding station	Utah Transit Authority	Following station
City Center toward Salt Lake Central	University Line	Library toward University Medical Center
Location

Gallivan Plaza station is a light rail station in Downtown Salt Lake City, Utah, United States serviced by the Blue Line and Green Line of the Utah Transit Authority's (UTA) TRAX system. The Blue Line has service from the Salt Lake Intermodal Hub in Downtown Salt Lake City to Draper. The Green Line provides service from the Salt Lake International Airport to West Valley City (via Downtown Salt Lake City).

== Description ==
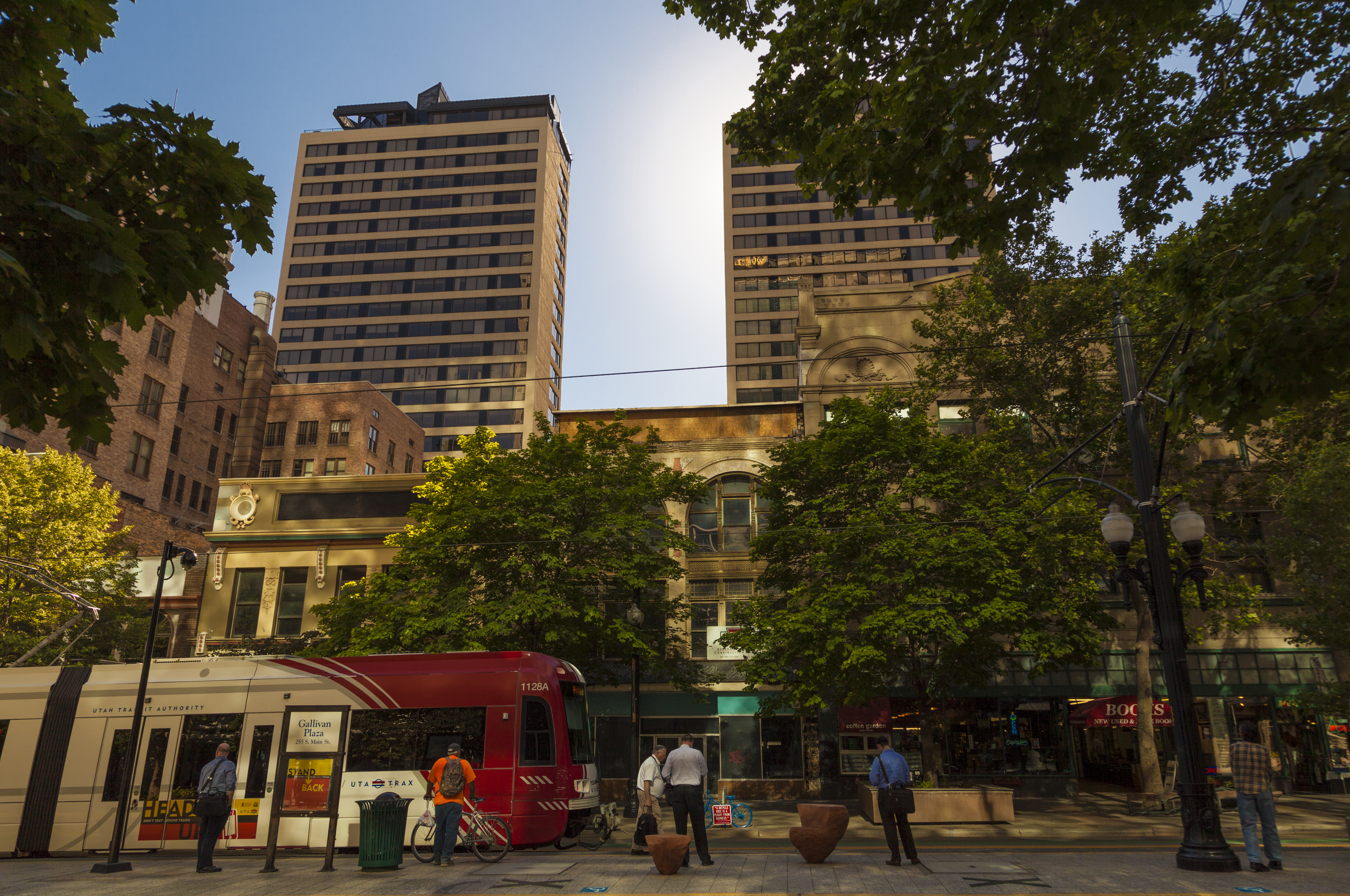
Gallivan Plaza Station looking west at American Towers.

The station is located at 275 South Main Street, with the island platform in the median of Main Street. The station is situated southwest of the Gallivan Center. It served as a transfer station from 2001 to 2011 while the University Line was open. Though not the official center of the city, the area is just as densely built-up as the area around City Center Station: the Wells Fargo Center (Salt Lake City) fills the whole street frontage east of the platform, while 222 Main, the One Utah Center, and the Walker Center (in that order) are just to the north along Main Street. All four of these skyscrapers have banks as anchor tenants, so the area is central to Salt Lake City's financial district. The station was opened on 4 December 1999 as part of the first operating segment of the TRAX system. and is operated by the Utah Transit Authority. The station is included in the Free Fare Zone in Downtown Salt Lake City. Transportation patrons that both enter and exit bus or TRAX service within the Zone can ride at no charge. Unlike many TRAX stations, Gallivan Plaza does not have a Park and Ride lot.

Like the Salt Lake Intermodal Hub (as well as City Center and Library), there is a nearby Greenbike docking station. Greenbike is a bicycle-sharing system within Downtown Salt Lake City that allows members to pick up bicycles from any docking station and then drop it off at any docking station, ideally for trips of 30 minutes or less to avoid additional charges. Greenbike is seasonal and, depending on weather conditions, shuts down operations in November–December and starts up again in March–April.
