= Olympic Stadium station =

Olympic Stadium station may refer to:

- Olympic Stadium station (Nanjing Metro), a station on the Nanjing Metro in Jiangsu, China
- Olympic Stadium station (Nanchang Metro), a station on Line 1 (Nanchang Metro) in Jiangxi, China

== See also ==
- Olympic Sports Center station (disambiguation)
- Stadium station (disambiguation)
