= Olympic Sports Center station =

Olympic Sports Center station may refer to:

- Aoti Zhongxin (Olympic Sports Center) station, on Line 8 of the Beijing Subway, China
- Aotizhongxin station, on Line 2 and Line 9 of the Shenyang Metro, China
- Olympic Sports Center station (Chongqing Rail Transit), on the Loop line, China
- Olympic Sports Center station (Hangzhou Metro), on Line 6 and Line 7, China
- Olympic Sports Center station (Ningbo Rail Transit), on Line 4, China
- Olympic Sports Center station (Changzhou Metro), on Line 1 (Changzhou Metro), China
- Olympic Sports Center station (Lanzhou Metro), on Line 1 (Lanzhou Metro), China
- Olympic Sports Center station (Zhengzhou Metro), on Line 6 and Line 14 of the Zhengzhou Metro, China

== See also ==
- Olympic Stadium station (disambiguation)
