= Arena station (Utah Transit Authority) =

Rail station in Salt Lake City, Utah, US

Arena
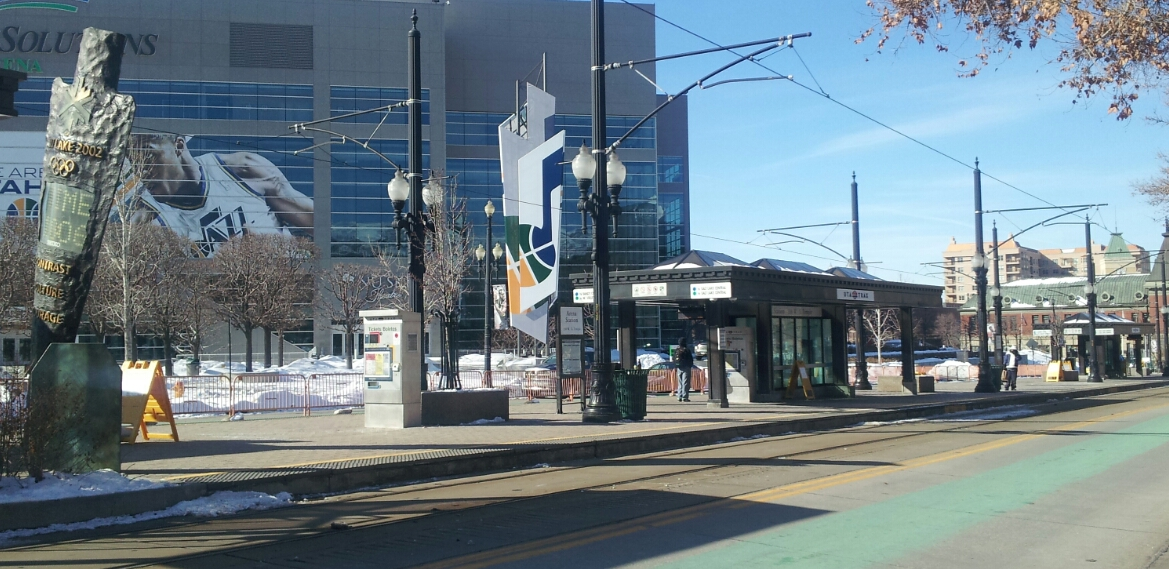
- Arena station platform as seen from the north looking towards Delta Center

General information
- Location: 301 West South Temple; Salt Lake City, Utah; U.S.
- Coordinates: 40°46′10″N 111°54′02″W
- Owner: Utah Transit Authority (UTA)
- Platforms: 1 island platform
- Tracks: 2
- Connections: UTA: 205, On Demand Salt Lake City Westside

Construction
- Structure type: At-grade
- Accessible: Yes

Other information
- Fare zone: Free Fare Zone

History
- Opened: December 4, 1999; 26 years ago
- Former names: Delta Center (1999–2006)

Services
Preceding station	Utah Transit Authority	Following station
Planetarium toward Salt Lake Central	Blue Line	Temple Square toward Draper Town Center
North Temple Bridge/Guadalupe toward Airport	Green Line	Temple Square toward West Valley Central
Proposed services
Preceding station	Utah Transit Authority	Following station
North Temple Bridge/Guadalupe toward Airport	Blue Line	Temple Square toward Draper Town Center
Planetarium toward Salt Lake Central	Green Line	Temple Square toward West Valley Central
Former services
Preceding station	Utah Transit Authority	Following station
Planetarium toward Salt Lake Central	University Line	Temple Square toward University Medical Center
Location

Arena station is a light rail station in Downtown Salt Lake City, Utah, United States, served by the Blue Line and Green Line of the Utah Transit Authority's (UTA) TRAX system. The Blue Line has service from the Salt Lake Intermodal Hub in Downtown Salt Lake City to Draper. The Green Line has service from the Salt Lake City International Airport and to West Valley City via Downtown Salt Lake City.

== Description ==
The station is located at 301 West South Temple immediately north of the Delta Center, with the island platform in the median of the street. The station opened on December 4, 1999, and was part of the first operating segment of the TRAX system. It is operated by the Utah Transit Authority. The station is included in the Free Fare Zone in Downtown Salt Lake City. Transportation patrons that both enter and exit bus or TRAX service within the Zone can ride at no charge. Unlike many TRAX stations, Arena does not have a Park and Ride lot.

== History ==
This station was originally the northern terminus of TRAX until April 27, 2008, when the extension to the Salt Lake Intermodal Hub (Salt Lake Central) opened As of December 9, 2012 the Green Line was rerouted and Arena became the temporary northern terminus. With the opening of the airport extension on April 14, 2013, service continued on to the Salt Lake International Airport.

The station was closed during the 2002 Winter Olympics since it was in the Olympic Plaza. The countdown clock from the games still remains on the platform. It is in the shape of an arrowhead because of the Native American weapons that were unearthed during the construction of the station. Arena was previously called Delta Center, but when the name of the arena was changed to EnergySolutions Arena, the UTA Board of Trustees officially changed the station name to Arena in December 2006. "EnergySolutions" was not included in the name as the UTA Board decided to no longer allow corporate names on stations.
