= Salt Lake City Intermodal Hub =

Intermodal transit center in Utah, USA

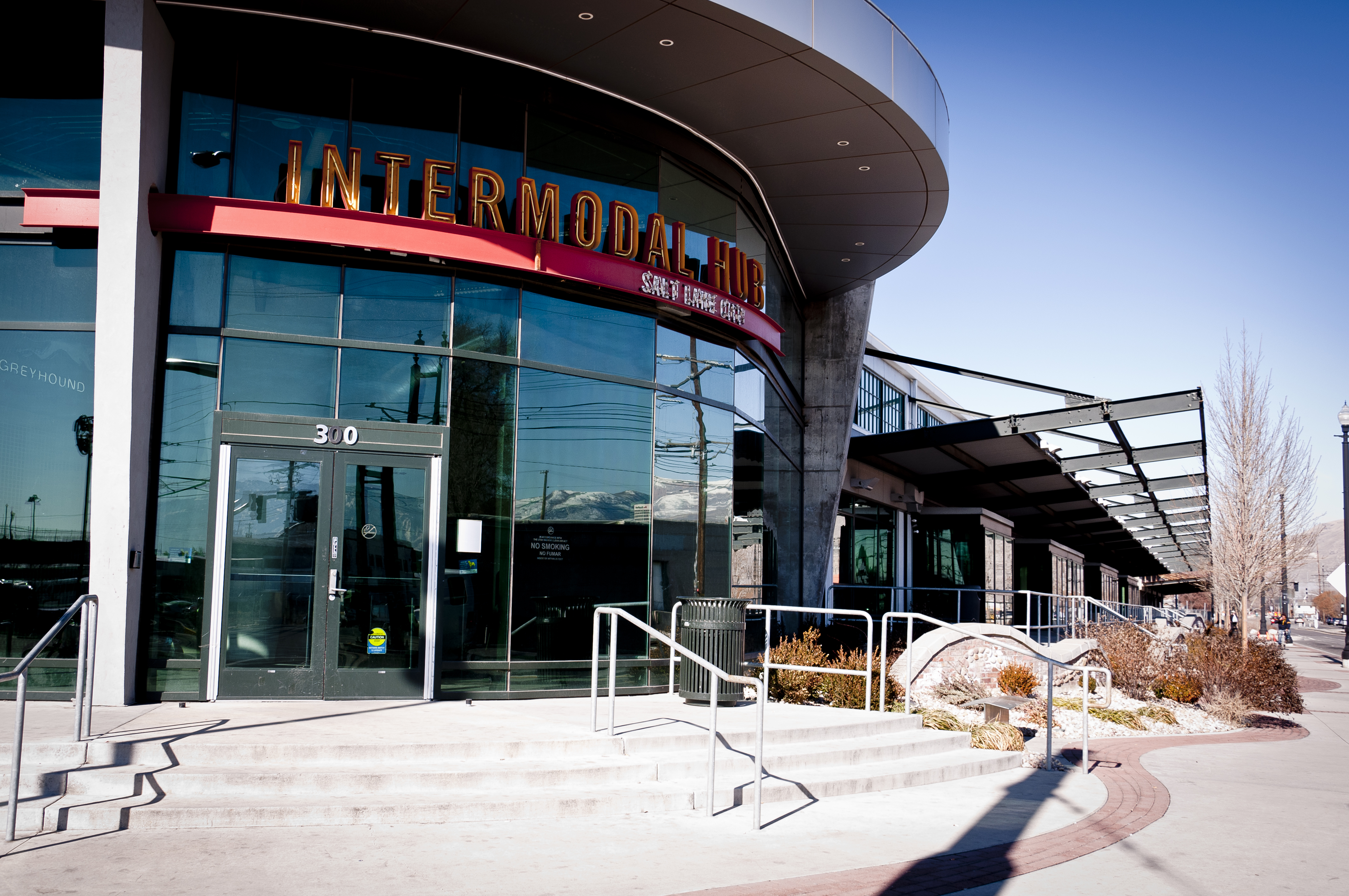
- The Intermodal Hub looking north along 600 West

General information
- Other names: Salt Lake Central
- Location: 600 West 300 South; Salt Lake City, Utah; United States
- Coordinates: 40°45′46″N 111°54′30″W
- Owner: Utah Transit Authority (UTA)
- Line: Lynndyl Subdivision
- Platforms: 1 island platform (Amtrak); 1 island and 1 side platform (FrontRunner); 1 island and 1 side platform (TRAX)
- Tracks: 6
- Connections: UTA: 2, 209, 220, 509, 513, On Demand Salt Lake City Westside; Amtrak Thruway; Greyhound Lines; High Valley Transit: 107

Construction
- Structure type: At-grade
- Cycle facilities: Greenbike Bikeshare
- Accessible: Yes

Other information
- Station code: Amtrak: SLC (trains); Amtrak: SLB (buses)
- Fare zone: Free Fare Zone (UTA buses & TRAX)

History
- Opened: August 5, 1999; 27 years ago (Amtrak); July 26, 2005; 21 years ago (Greyhound); April 27, 2008; 18 years ago (UTA TRAX & FrontRunner); April 21, 2026 (Canyon Spirit)

Passengers
- FY 2025: 36,073 (Amtrak)

Services
| Preceding station | Amtrak | Following station |
|---|---|---|
| Elko toward Emeryville | California Zephyr | Provo toward Chicago |
| Preceding station | Utah Transit Authority | Following station |
| North Temple toward Ogden Central | FrontRunner | Murray Central toward Provo Central |
| Terminus | Blue Line | Old GreekTown toward Draper Town Center |
| Preceding station | Rocky Mountaineer | Following station |
| Terminus | Canyon Spirit Rockies to the Red Rocks | Moab towards Denver |
Former services
| Preceding station | Utah Transit Authority | Following station |
|---|---|---|
| Terminus | Green Line 2011-2013 | Old GreekTown toward West Valley Central |
| Terminus | University Line 2008-2011 | Old GreekTown toward University Medical Center |
Location

The Salt Lake City Intermodal Hub, also called Salt Lake Central station by the Utah Transit Authority (UTA), is a multi-modal transportation hub in Salt Lake City, Utah, United States served by the Blue Line of UTA's TRAX light rail system that operates in Salt Lake County and by the FrontRunner, UTA's commuter rail train that operates along the Wasatch Front with service from Ogden in central Weber County through Davis County, Salt Lake City, and Salt Lake County to Provo in central Utah County. Service at the intermodal hub is also provided by Amtrak (with the California Zephyr), and Greyhound Lines, as well as UTA local bus service.

== Location ==
The Salt Lake City Intermodal Hub has several official addresses, depending on the service provider:

- 250 South 600 West – FrontRunner commuter rail
- 325 South 600 West – TRAX light rail
- 340 South 600 West – Amtrak inter-city passenger rail

However, passengers for all services at the intermodal hub can be dropped off in the cul-de-sac at the west end of 300 South off 600 West.

== Site history ==
The site of the hub is the former location of the Denver & Rio Grande Western Railroad (D&RGW) in Salt Lake City. This location housed the maintenance buildings, a roundhouse, and freight houses for the railroad. It also included D&RGW's original passenger depot prior to the construction of the 1910 depot on nearby Rio Grande Street.

The main hub building, along 600 West, opened in 2005. This building consists of a rehabilitated D&RGW freight house, with a modern round-shaped addition on the south end. The freight house originally extended further north, but was cut in half during the construction of the hub. The southern half became the main hub building, while the northern half was meant for rehabilitation as well. This did not occur, and the northern half of the freight house was torn down in 2012.

Until the 2010s, several large locomotive maintenance buildings remained on the west side of the railroad tracks. This changed on October 22, 2018, when UTA broke ground on a new bus maintenance facility at the site, which replaced the remaining D&RGW buildings on the west side of the tracks. Initially, the large circa 1900 boiler and engine shop was planned to be rehabilitated and used as a part of the new bus facility. However, the boiler and engine shop was torn down the following year, as a new building was more cost-effective and efficient.

The railroad tracks at the western edge of the hub, originally built as the mainline of the D&RGW, now serve as the mainline for the Union Pacific Railroad. The FrontRunner line shares this rail corridor.

== Services ==
=== Utah Transit Authority (UTA) ===
Salt Lake Central is the name of UTA portion of the Salt Lake Intermodal Hub and that is the station name used on all route maps and schedules (bus, the FrontRunner, and TRAX). The intermodal hub is in the Free Fare Zone of Downtown Salt Lake City which allows transportation patrons that both enter and exit bus or TRAX service within the Zone to ride fare free. The intermodal hub is also located within the Quiet Zone, so all trains (including Amtrak's) do not routinely sound their horns when approaching public crossings within this corridor. Unlike most FrontRunner and TRAX stations, there is only a small Park and Ride lot in close proximity to Salt Lake Central.

==== Local bus ====
There are also multiple UTA Bus service routes that include Salt Lake Central as one of their stops. Local bus service is provided to all areas of Salt Lake City, as well as a few other cities within Salt Lake County. Bus service is also provided to the Kimball Junction Transit Center in Summit County via High Valley Transit, where connections with Park City Transit can be made. Previously UTA offered service from the hub to Park City via the PC-SLC Connect, but ended that service on December 11, 2022.

==== FrontRunner ====
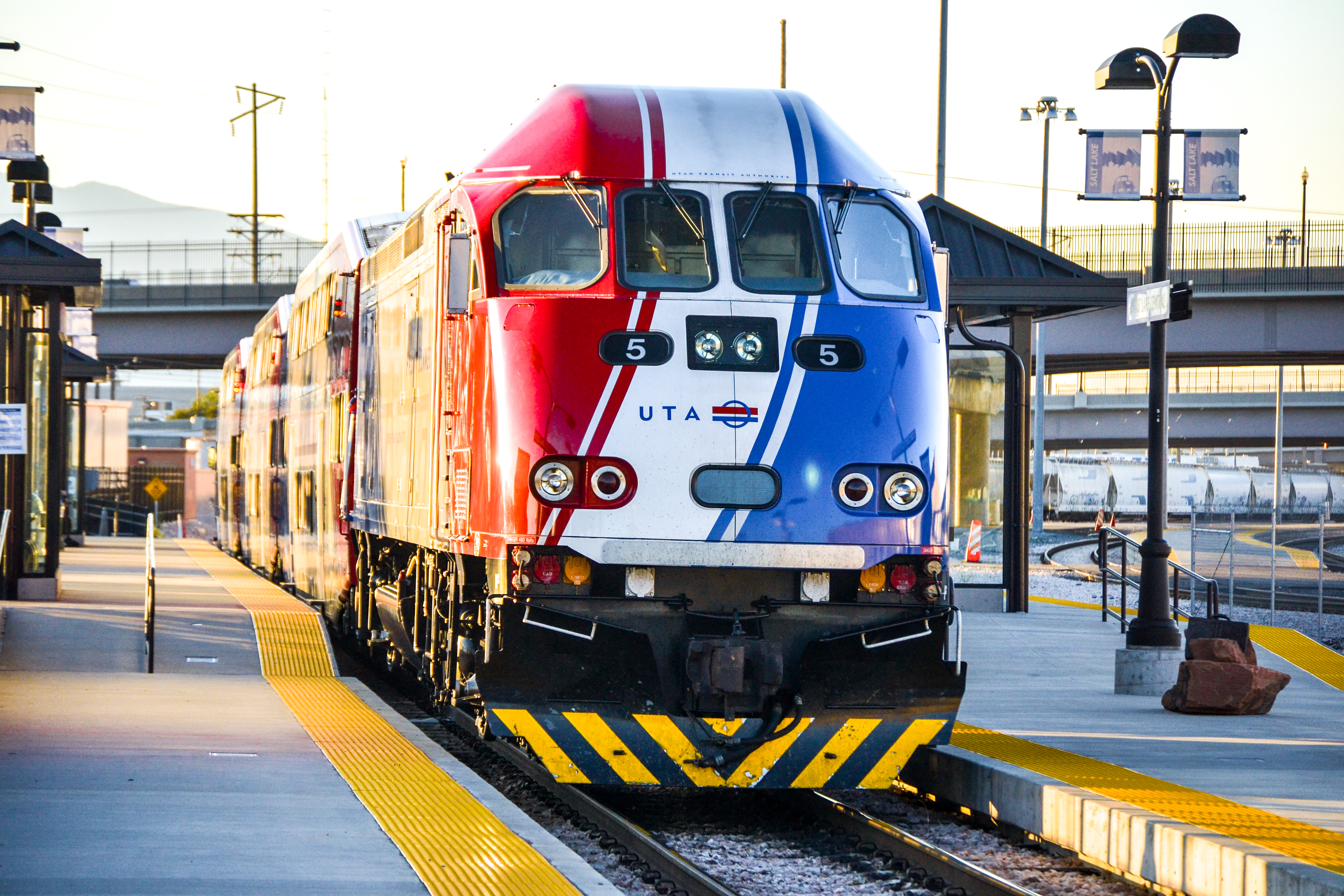
FrontRunner platforms

The FrontRunner has 23 weekday Ogden–Provo round trips via Salt Lake City with five additional round trips between Ogden and Downtown Salt Lake City. Saturdays consist of 15 Odgen–Provo round trips. Trains operate hourly between approximately 5:00 am and midnight on weekdays (increasing to half-hour runs during morning and evening commutes), with slightly later service on Fridays. Saturdays consist of hourly runs between approximately 6:00 AM and 1:30 AM. As of 2022, the system does not operate on Sundays and some holidays.

Formerly the FrontRunner provided service further north of Ogden, to Pleasant View, before that service was cut in 2018.

==== TRAX ====
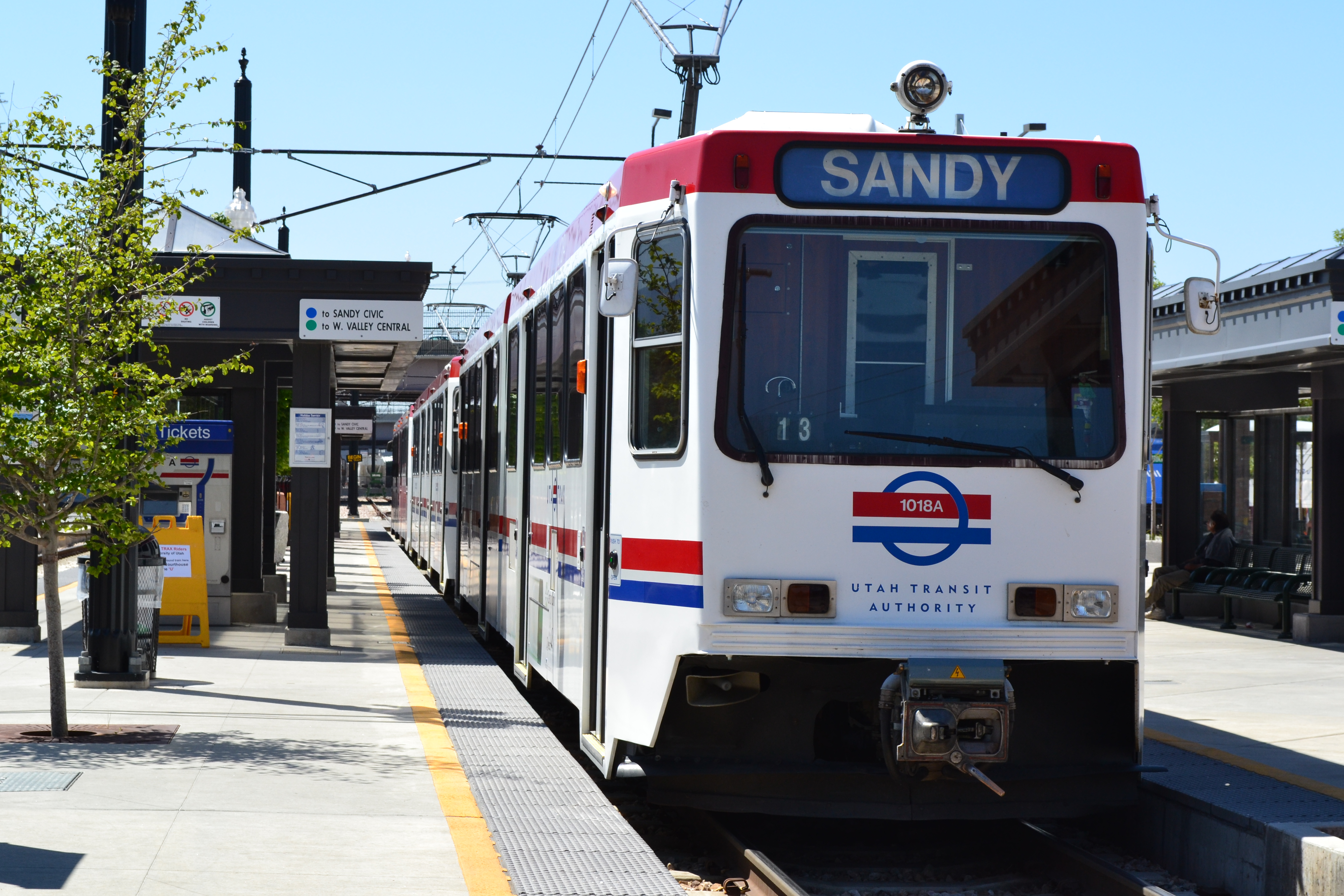
TRAX platforms

Service by TRAX and the FrontRunner commenced on April 27, 2008, with the opening ceremony on April 26 at 12:30 pm. Salt Lake Central is the northern terminus of the TRAX Blue Line and the former northern terminus of the Green Line. There is no direct connection at the hub with the Red Line, nor the Green Line (following its reroute to the Salt Lake City International Airport). The Blue Line provides service to Draper in southern Salt Lake County as well as connections with the Green and Red lines at other stations (with the Red Line providing service between University of Utah and the Daybreak Community in South Jordan in southwest Salt Lake County and the Green Line providing service from West Valley City to the Salt Lake City International Airport (via Downtown Salt Lake City).

=== Amtrak ===
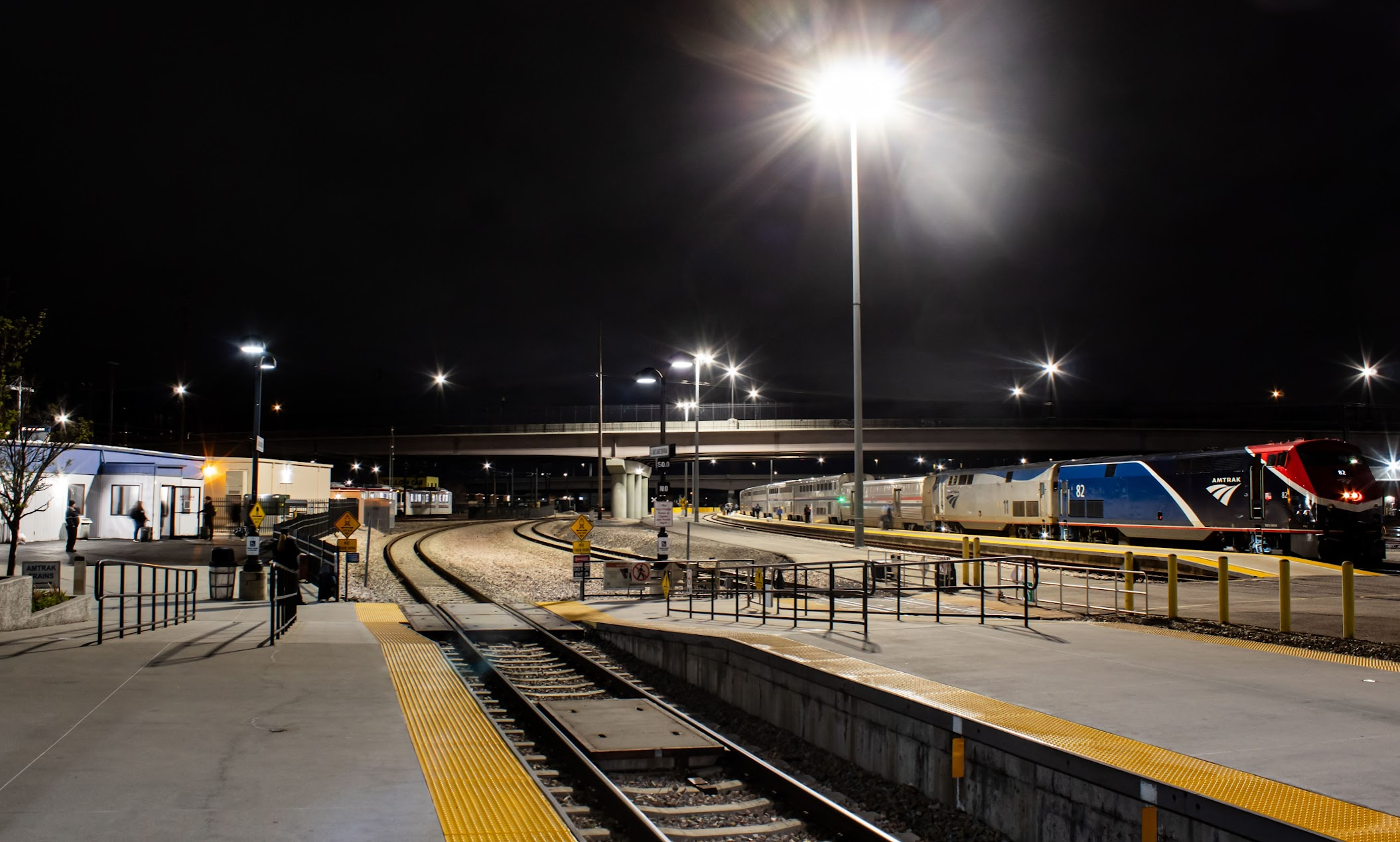
Salt Lake Central Station with the California Zephyr

The intermodal hub is served by the California Zephyr, which provides once-daily service to Emeryville, California (in the San Francisco Bay Area), to the west and Chicago, Illinois, to the east on Union Pacific trackage in both directions. (The next westbound stop is Elko, Nevada and the next eastbound stop is Provo.) Amtrak's official listings (for train service) refer to the intermodal hub as Salt Lake City, UT (SLC). Amtrak was the first tenant of the intermodal hub, constructing a "shack" (initially meant to be temporary) in 1999. In addition to the California Zephyr, Amtrak offers its Amtrak Thruway connections with service to Boise, Idaho (including stops in Odgen and Twin Falls) and to Las Vegas, Nevada (including stops in Provo and St, George). Service for both Amtrak Thruway routes is provided by Greyhound Lines.) Amtrak's official listings (for bus service) refer to the intermodal hub as Salt Lake City, UT – Bus Station (SLB).

=== Intercity bus ===
Greyhound Lines provide bus service to points all across the United States. Some of its routes are operated in partnership with Amtrak's Thruway Motorcoach. The Greyhound station has been closed.

Other transportation companies that serve the hub include Mountain States Express.

=== Greenbike ===
Greenbike (Note: GREENbike is a collaborative program between the Salt Lake City Redevelopment Agency, the Salt Lake City Transportation Division, the Salt Lake Chamber, The Downtown Alliance, Select Health, Rio Tinto, Utah Transit Authority, and Visit Salt Lake.) is a bicycle sharing system (differentiated from bicycle rental) within Downtown Salt Lake City operated by SLC Bike Share (affiliated with B-cycle). The Greenbike program is intended for short bicycle trips and allows members to pick up any of the available bicycles at any of the many docking stations and then drop it off at any docking station (does not have to be the same docking station where the bicycle was picked up). Greenbike offers 7-day and annual memberships, but 24-hour passes are also available for non-members. Greenbike members are allowed unlimited short trips, with a trip being defined as the time between when the bicycle is removed from a docking station and when it is returned to a docking station. However bicycles may be kept longer than 30 minutes between dockings for additional charges. In addition, members can start a "new trip" immediately after returning the bicycle to any docking station. The bicycles provided by Greenbike are equipped with GPS tracking system that records and provides the member with the miles ridden (and calories burned). Greenbike is seasonal and, depending on weather conditions, shuts down operations in November–December and starts up again in March–April. Other Greenbike docking stations are located near the City Center, Gallivan Plaza, and Library stations.

== Service history ==
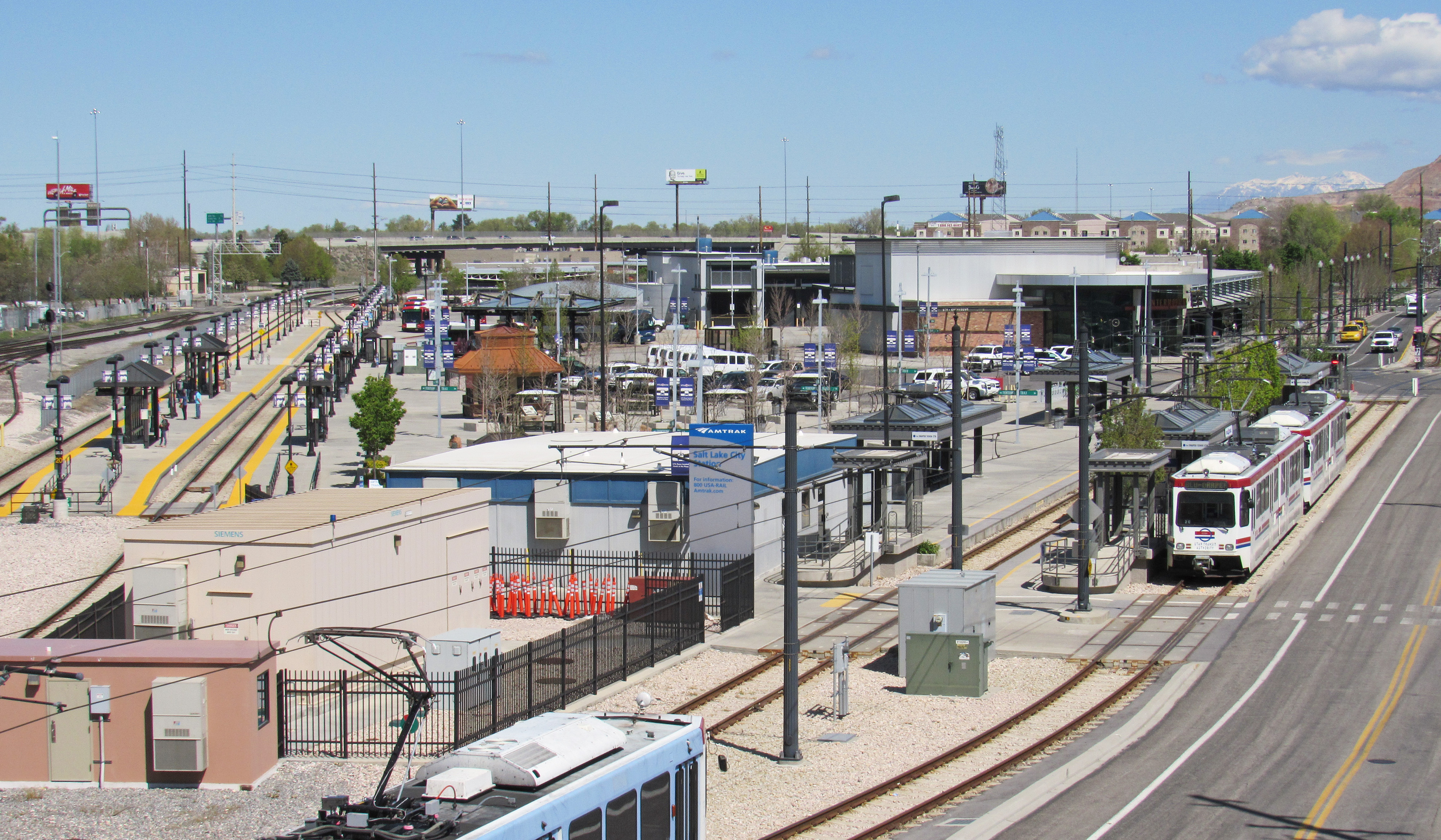
A view of the hub in 2017

Before moving to the intermodal hub in 1999, Amtrak trains provided service at the Union Pacific Depot at 400 West and South Temple, and in 1986 moved to the Rio Grande Depot at 300 South Rio Grande Street. Original plans did not have TRAX serving the intermodal hub, only Amtrak, Greyhound, the FrontRunner, and UTA buses. However, by 2004, UTA decided to extend TRAX to the intermodal hub. By 2005, a three-station extension from Arena to the intermodal hub was selected, and construction began in 2007.

== Future plans ==
Future expansion of the FrontRunner is anticipated to include service north to Brigham City and south to Payson.

There have been studies regarding the feasibility of resuming Amtrak's Desert Wind and Pioneer routes. In 2022, the Federal Railroad Administration began a study to identify intercity passenger routes for further evaluation and funding. Out of the 15 routes identified, two routes that ran through Salt Lake City were featured. Included is a Los Angeles, California to Denver, Colorado; and a Seattle, Washington to Denver, Colorado route. Further evaluation and funding would be required to proceed with creating such routes.

UTA eventually plans to relocate its nearby headquarters to a new building adjacent to the Intermodal Hub. This would coincide with redevelopment of the area between the Intermodal Hub and the Rio Grande Depot by the Redevelopment Agency (RDA) of Salt Lake City, a project known as Station Center. Plans call for large amounts of new housing and office development, and in 2021 the University of Utah entered into an agreement with the RDA to acquire land in the Station Center project area for a satellite campus. While current plans label the historic Rio Grande Depot as a "barrier to development" because of the way it blocks 300 South street, some citizens are calling for it to once again become the city's principal train station by diverting rail traffic along the still-existing 500 West right-of-way.

The Rio Grande Plan is a separate proposal to move Amtrak and FrontRunner service from the intermodal hub back to the historic Rio Grande Depot, placing downtown rail traffic below grade along 500 West.
