= TRAX (light rail) =

Light rail system in Utah, USA

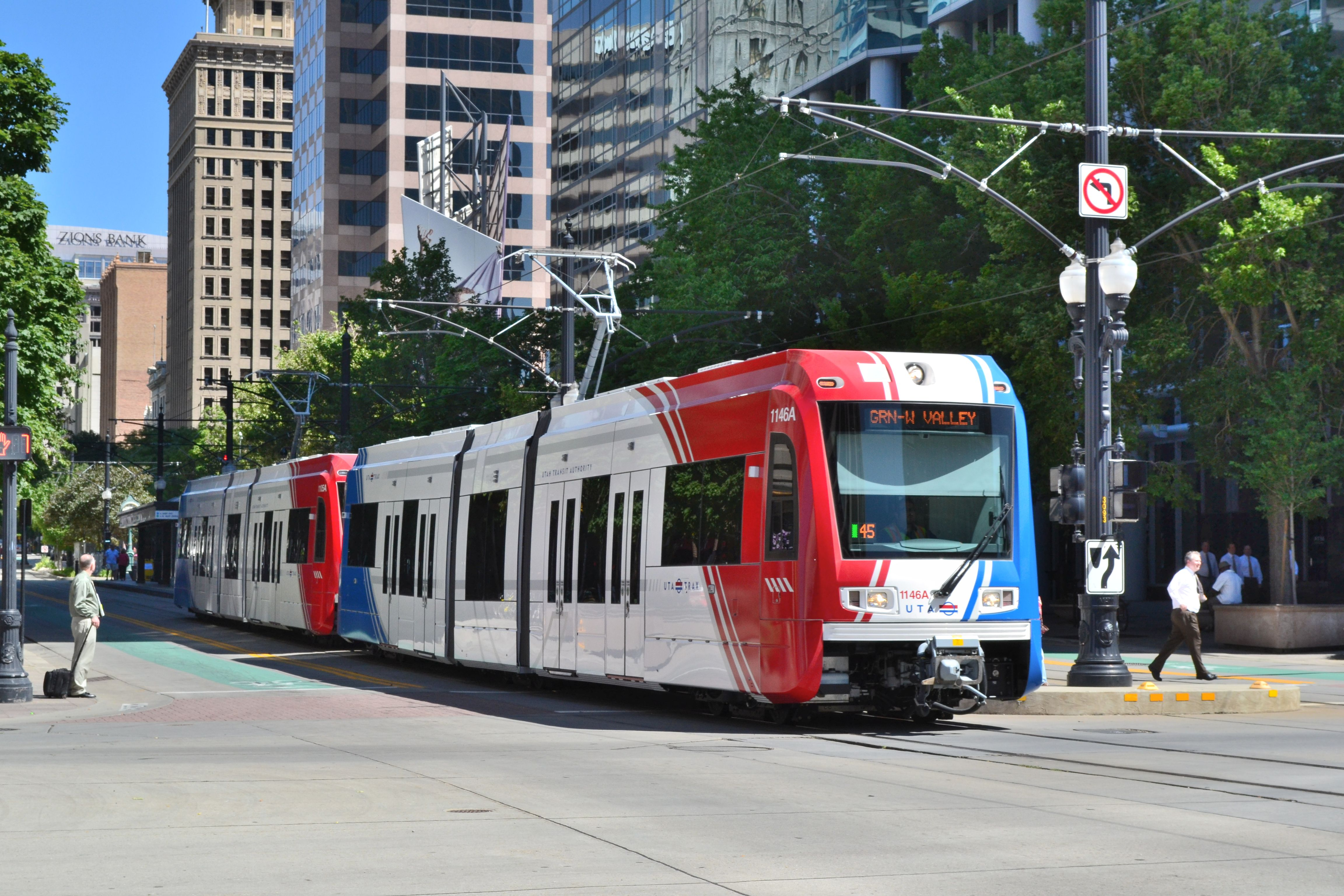
- TRAX Green Line train at Gallivan Plaza

Overview
- Owner: Utah Transit Authority (UTA)
- Area served: Salt Lake Valley
- Locale: Salt Lake County, Utah, U.S.
- Transit type: Light rail
- Number of lines: 3
- Number of stations: 52
- Daily ridership: 40,300 (weekdays, Q2 2026) (Note: Ridership data for 2014 and beyond also includes UTA's streetcar (S Line) operations)
- Annual ridership: 13,279,100 (2025)
- Headquarters: 3600 South 700 West; South Salt Lake, Utah
- Website: rideuta.com

Operation
- Began operation: December 4, 1999; 26 years ago
- Number of vehicles: 117 (total): 23 Siemens SD-100; 17 Siemens SD-160; 77 Siemens S70 US

Technical
- System length: 44.8 mi (72.1 km)
- Track gauge: 4 ft 8 1/2 in (1,435 mm) standard gauge
- Electrification: Overhead line, 750 V DC
System map
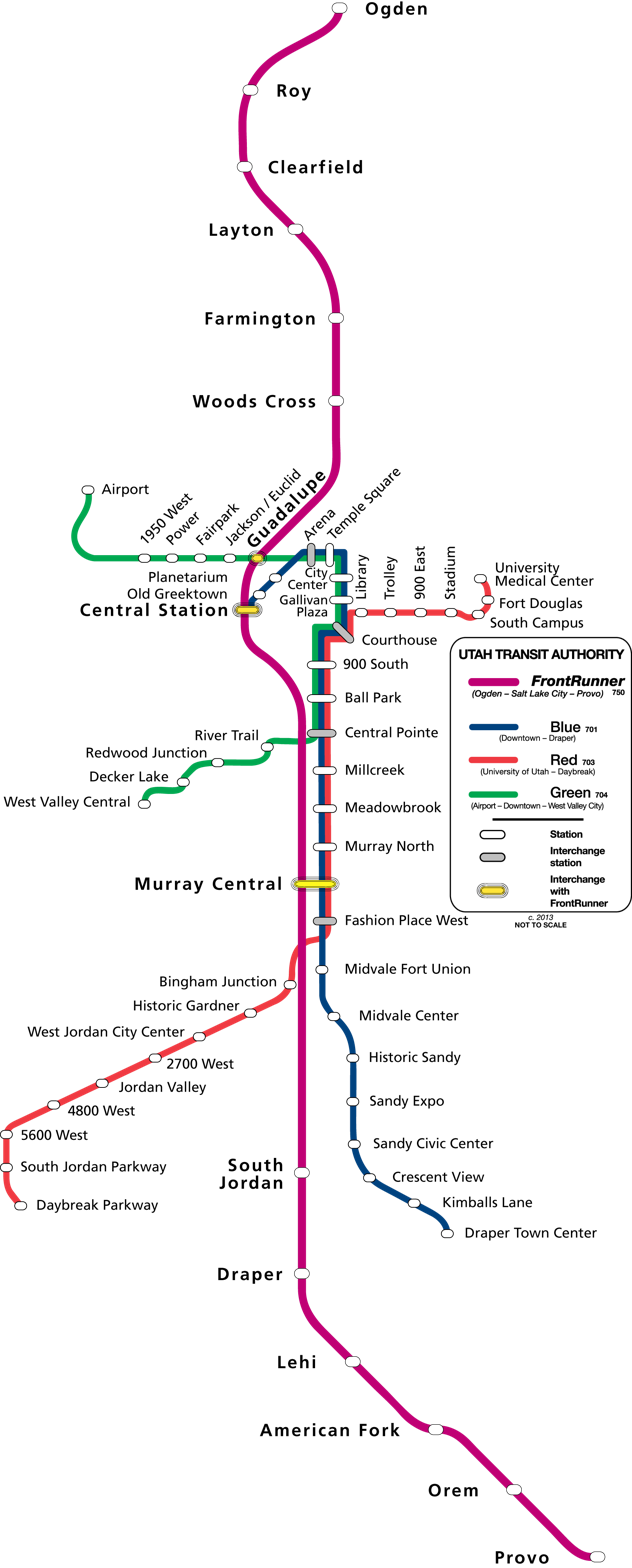
A map of the entire UTA rail system by August 2013

TRAX is a light rail system in the Salt Lake Valley of Utah, in the United States, serving Salt Lake City and many of its suburbs throughout Salt Lake County. The system's official name, Transit Express, is rarely, if ever, used. The system is operated by the Utah Transit Authority (UTA). All TRAX trains are electric, receiving power from overhead wires.

TRAX has 52 stations on three lines. The Blue Line provides service from Downtown Salt Lake City to Draper. The Red Line provides service from the University of Utah to the Daybreak Community of South Jordan. The Green Line provides service from Salt Lake City International Airport to West Valley City. In 2025, the system had a ridership of 13,279,100, or about 40,300 per weekday as of the second quarter of 2026.

== Operations ==
=== Service characteristics ===
TRAX operates seven days a week, with the exception of some holidays. It operates Monday through Friday from approximately 4:30 a.m. to 11:30 p.m. with a 15-minute headway on each line during the entirety of operating hours. It operates weekends from approximately 5:00 am to nearly midnight, with a 15-minute headway on Saturdays and a 30-minute headway on Sundays.

Outside of major events, based on projected ridership, the Blue Line typically operates 2-3 car trains, the Green Line 2 car trains, and the Red Line 2-4 car trains.

=== Lines and stations ===
TRAX Lines
Line	Opened (extensions)	Stations	Length	Terminals
Blue Line; UTA Route 701	1999 (2008, 2013)	25	19.3 miles (31.1 km)	Downtown Salt Lake City – Draper (Salt Lake Central – Draper Town Center)
Red Line; UTA Route 703	2001 (2003, 2011)	27	23.7 miles (38.1 km)	University of Utah (Salt Lake City) – Daybreak (South Jordan) (University Medical Center – Daybreak Parkway)
Green Line; UTA Route 704	2011 (2013)	19	15.01 miles (24.16 km)	Salt Lake City International Airport – West Valley City (Airport – West Valley Central)

=== Rolling stock ===
==== Current ====
TRAX has 117 active light rail vehicles:

- 23 Siemens SD-100 LRVs (1001–1023) built 1998
- 17 Siemens SD-160 LRVs (1024–1040) built 2001–2003
- 77 Siemens S70 LRVs (1101–1177) built 2010–2012

In 2024, UTA ordered 20 Stadler Citylink vehicles, with upwards to 80 vehicles, to replace the Siemens SD-100 and SD-160 LRVs. They are expected to enter service in 2028. They will be built in Salt Lake City.

TRAX Rolling Stock
Year	Manufacturer	Model	Image	Fleet numbers	Quantity	References
1998	Siemens	SD-100	Thumbnail photo of a TRAX SD-100.	1001–1023	23	
2001–2003	Siemens	SD-160	Thumbnail photo of a TRAX SD-160.	1024–1040	17	
2010–2012	Siemens	S70	Thumbnail photo of a TRAX S70.	1101–1177	77	
2027–2028	Stadler	Citylink			20 + 60 options (on order)	

==== Former ====
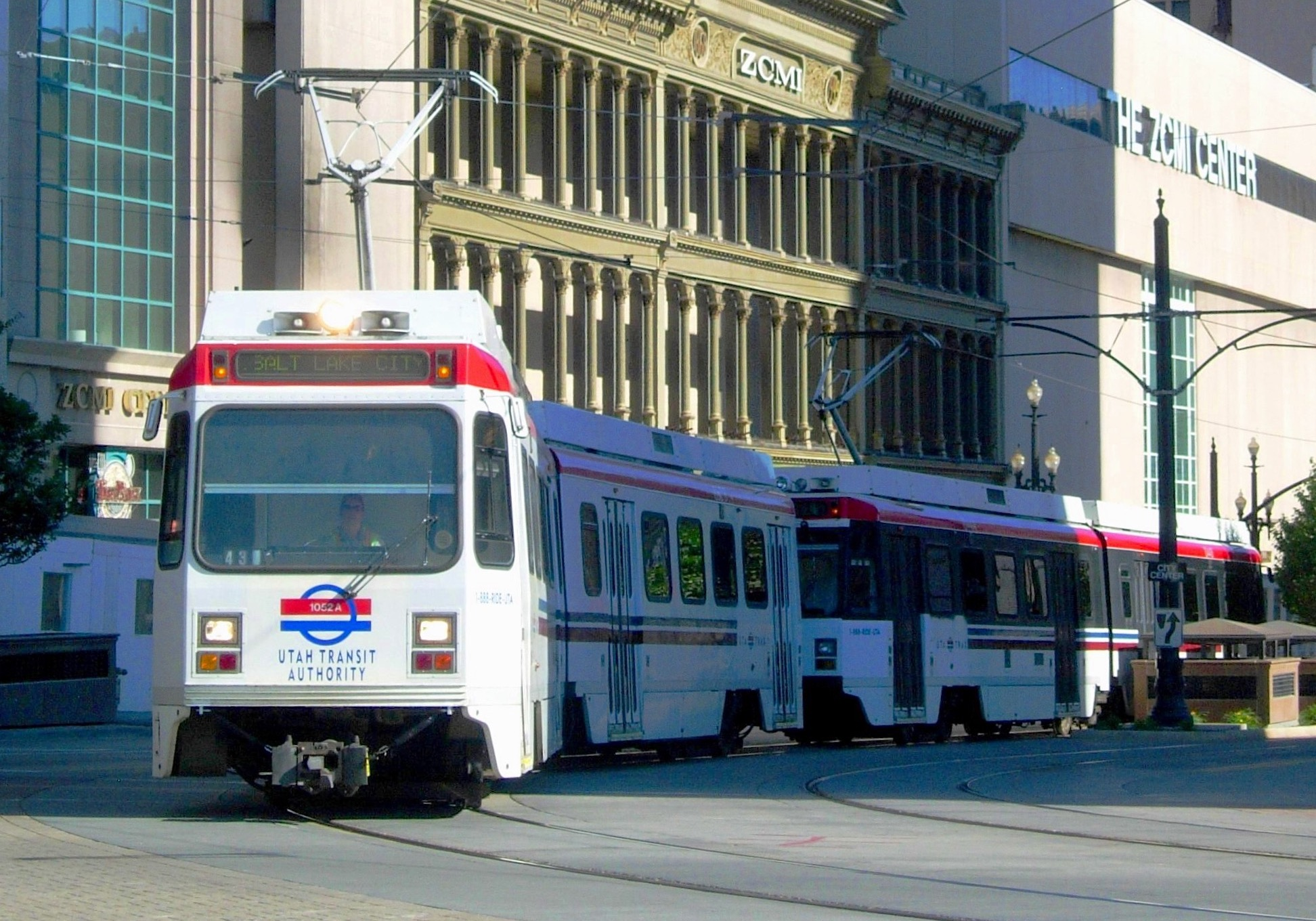
A UTDC LRV at Main & Temple near City Center station in 2007.

To handle the increased crowds during the 2002 Winter Olympics, 29 Kinki Sharyo LRVs were borrowed by UTA from the Dallas Area Rapid Transit (DART) between 2001 and 2003. The additional cars were compatible with the TRAX system's infrastructure and were unneeded at the time for DART as several projects remained under construction.

In July 2003, UTA approved the acquisition of 29 second-hand UTDC LRVs (1041–1069) that had been used by the Santa Clara Valley Transportation Authority for the VTA light rail system. The first VTA car was delivered in March 2004 and entered service later that year. They were refurbished by Bombardier Transportation in 2007 alongside additional cars from New Jersey Transit. The VTA cars were withdrawn from service in 2018.

== History ==
In 1984, the UTA, Utah Department of Transportation, and the Wasatch Front Regional Council conducted a joint study known as the "I-15/State Street Corridor Alternatives Analysis", which concluded that automobile traffic on those two roadways would increase and become more congested over time. The construction of a light rail system parallel to the interstate emerged as the UTA's preferred option to decrease congestion. In 1990, a state law was passed allowing Salt Lake County to increase local sales tax by 0.25 percent, with 75 percent of the revenue going to construction of the light rail system and the other 25 percent to expand Interstate 15, dependent on a referendum approving the increase. The referendum was held on November 3, 1992, and it failed, with 57 percent of county voters rejecting the measure.

Despite the referendum result, the UTA agreed in January 1993 to purchase 23 miles of trackage from Union Pacific, with most of the cost covered by federal funding. With the local tax increase having been rejected, UTA depended on funding from the Federal Transit Administration to construct the line. Congress rejected that funding in June 1995, but the urgency of building transit in the area grew later that month when Salt Lake City was awarded the 2002 Winter Olympics. In August 1995, the UTA and FTA signed a Full Funding Grant Agreement, requiring the UTA to construct the line by December 2000. The FTA offered to cover 80 percent of construction costs, but the agreement was binding whether Congress approved the federal grants or not.

After federal funding was approved, the system was given the name TRAX on March 3, 1997, and a groundbreaking ceremony was held on April 10. The first line, running from downtown Salt Lake City south to Sandy, opened on December 4, 1999. A branch extending from downtown to Rice–Eccles Stadium was completed on December 15, 2001, two months before the Olympic opening ceremony was held there, and further extended to the University of Utah Hospital on September 29, 2003.

An extension to the Salt Lake City Intermodal Hub was completed in April 2008. In August 2011, two extensions to South Jordan and West Valley City were completed. With the opening of these two extensions in 2011, the TRAX lines were renamed as colors instead of destinations, with the Blue Line running from the Salt Lake City Intermodal Hub to Sandy, the Red Line running from the University of Utah Medical Center to the Daybreak community in South Jordan, and the Green Line running from the intermodal hub to the West Valley Intermodal Hub.

In 2013 the Green Line was realigned slightly north and away from the Salt Lake City Intermodal Hub, allowing for the opening of the extension to the Salt Lake City International Airport. Several months later, in August 2013, the Blue Line was extended further south to Draper (which opened August 18, 2013). The extensions to South Jordan, West Valley City, Draper, and the Airport were funded in part by a Salt Lake County sales tax increase that would pay for all four of the proposed TRAX extensions. A letter of intent signed with the Federal Transit Administration on September 24, 2007, secured the remaining funding for the light rail lines.

Both the University Line and its extension to the University Medical Center were completed ahead of schedule. A daily ridership of 15,000 was expected for the initial 15-mile (24 km) line in 1999. By the beginning of 2008, the expanded system of 17.5 miles (28.2 km) served an estimated 40,000 passengers each day. Ridership for the fourth quarter of 2012 was reported to be at 60,600, making it the ninth-busiest light rail system in the United States.

Light rail in the Salt Lake Valley was first seriously discussed in the late 1980s to provide an alternative to traffic congestion on I-15, but the idea was met with criticism. On October 10, 1988, Congress approved $5 million in funds to preserve land along the proposed light rail corridor. Funding for the light rail line, however, remained uncertain. After Salt Lake City won the bid for the 2002 Winter Olympics in 1995, UTA used the city's host status to accelerate obtaining funding through the Federal Transit Administration (FTA). Construction began in 1997. Protesters at the groundbreaking insisted light rail would be dangerous and a waste of money. Public opinion remained divided and businesses on Main Street in downtown Salt Lake City suffered during the construction period.

After the north–south line opened in late 1999 with sixteen stations, ridership expectations were quickly met. The system was enthusiastically embraced by valley residents, to the surprise of many, and once-skeptical communities soon began clamoring for extensions.

Funding for the University Line to Rice-Eccles Stadium allowed it to be completed in 2001 with four new stations, ahead of schedule and the Olympics. An extension to the University Medical Center that added three new stations was completed on September 29, 2003, fifteen months ahead of schedule. An infill station at 900 South in Salt Lake City was constructed in 2005, and a second infill station, at 9400 South in Sandy (Sandy Expo), opened in August 2006. On December 13, 2006, UTA's board of trustees voted to change the name of the station next to the Delta Center to "Arena" in response to the renaming of the Delta Center to EnergySolutions Arena (which is once again known as the Delta Center).

On February 23, 2006, plans for extending the main line westward to the current Salt Lake City Intermodal Hub near the Gateway were approved. Two stations were built near the Gateway, as well as one at the Salt Lake Central Station (Salt Lake Intermodal Hub). They opened in April 2008, bringing the total number of stations to 28.

UTA has two service centers for TRAX maintenance: the Midvale Rail Service Center, which is just off the Red Line in Midvale, southwest of its junction with the Blue Line, and the Jordan River Service Center, which is just off the Green Line northeast of River Trail. The Jordan River building was originally an old warehouse for ZCMI, which had recently ceased operations and was renovated into a rail service center in 1999. The Midvale Center was similarly repurposed from a former warehouse around the time of the Red and Green lines opening in 2011, it was also built to handle UTA's brand new Siemens S70 LRV's. Utah Railway (under its subsidiary Salt Lake City Southern Railroad and with contracts from BNSF) and the Savage Bingham & Garfield Railroad both operate freight service over TRAX tracks via trackage rights.

An additional infill station, 600 South Main Street in Salt Lake City, along all three lines, opened on July 26, 2022. The station was part of the initial plans for the system, but the demand was not at the level needed for a station until recently.

=== FrontLines 2015 ===
On September 21, 2006, a property tax hike proposal was replaced with a general transportation quarter-cent sales tax hike that was voted on and approved on November 7 of that year. On December 21, 2006, the Salt Lake County Council created a priority list for the sales tax, saying TRAX and commuter rail should take priority. A letter of intent signed with the Federal Transit Administration on September 24, 2007, secured the remaining $500 million in funding for the light rail lines. These funds were used to finance the FrontLines 2015 expansion project, which added four TRAX extensions by 2015 (as well as an expansion to FrontRunner commuter rail).

In order to support planned TRAX expansion, UTA ordered 77 Siemens S70 light rail vehicles from Siemens. It is the company's largest light rail contract in the United States to date.

In 2008, construction began on two new extensions: one extension of 5.1 miles (8.2 km) through West Valley City (now part of the Green Line) and another extension of 10.6 miles (17.1 km) through the southwest portion of the Salt Lake Valley (now part of the Red Line). Both extensions were debuted in ceremonial openings on August 2, 2011, and permanently opened for regular service on August 7. Both extensions were completed ahead of schedule and under budget. Upon completion of these expansions UTA adopted a color-code line names in place of their old destination-based line names.

After the first year of operation, ridership on these portions of the Green and Red lines was less than was projected by UTA. However, UTA has stated the projected ridership was for the year 2015. Since these lines were opened for service years earlier than originally planned, the anticipated growth on the west side of Salt Lake Valley has just not happened, yet. UTA affirms that by 2015 ridership will meet the original projections.

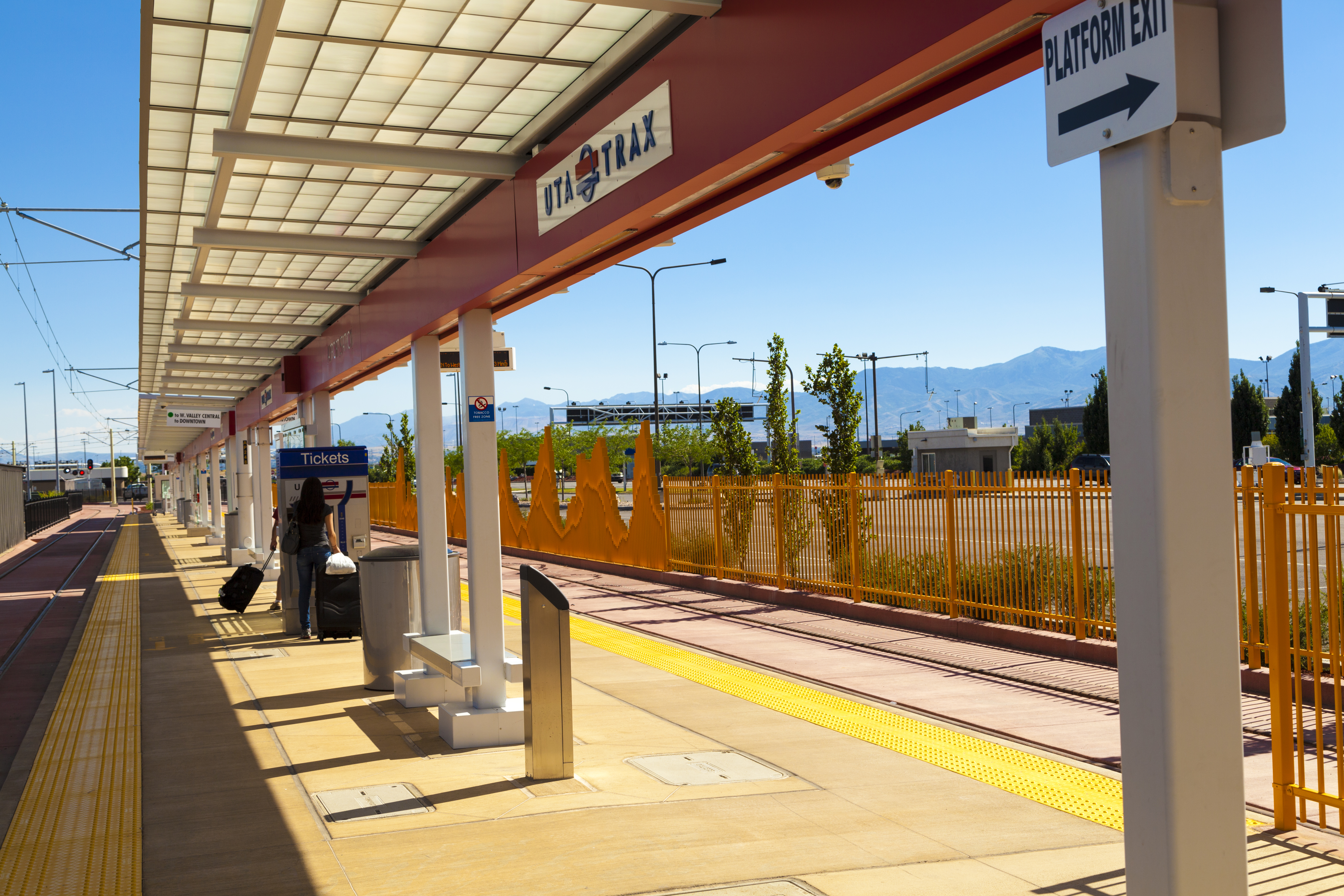
Salt Lake International Airport station, prior to being relocated to the rebuilt terminal in 2021

A line from Salt Lake City International Airport to the University of Utah was in the original plans for the system to be completed before the 2002 Winter Olympics, but funding shortages only allowed the eastern portion to be constructed. The airport line eventually came to fruition, however, and ground was broken on October 22, 2008. The extension opened on April 14, 2013, adding 6 miles (9.7 km) and six additional stations to the Green Line, including a transfer station to the FrontRunner.

On November 14, 2006, the Draper City Council approved the TRAX extension into that city. Neighbors in the area have continually fought the route suggested by UTA. The route follows an old rail line and UTA already owned the right of way. An alternative route that would run down the middle of State Street was also studied by UTA. Use of the UTA right of way for the line was challenged in court and later approved by the Utah Supreme Court on July 12, 2008. UTA published a draft Environmental Impact Statement for the new line that names the UTA right of way as the preferred route. The extension's first phase, which includes 3.5 miles (5.6 km) and three new stations, opened on August 18, 2013.

=== FrontRunner ===
When FrontRunner (UTA's commuter rail train) started running on April 26, 2008, the only transfer station between the FrontRunner and TRAX was Salt Lake Central (Salt Lake Intermodal Hub), with the FrontRunner running north from that station to Ogden. However, with the opening of the FrontRunner South extension on December 10, 2012, with service south to Provo, Murray Central station was added as second transfer station which allowed for transfer to the Blue and Red lines. Although not part of the FrontRunner South extension, FrontRunner service at the new North Temple station also began on the same day. When the Airport extension of the Green Line opened for service on April 14, 2013, this station became the third transfer station between FrontRunner and TRAX. The FrontRunner portion of this station was built to provide a transfer station between FrontRunner and the Green Line, since the reroute of the Green Line for the Airport extension would have left the Green Line without any common station with FrontRunner.

=== S Line ===
For several years a TRAX spur into the Salt Lake City neighborhood of Sugar House had been contemplated. A series of community meetings were held in Sugar House as part of a larger transit study undertaken by UTA. Several transit alternatives were presented to the neighborhood, including bus rapid transit, light rail, and a streetcar. The streetcar seemed to be the preferred alternative. On October 20, 2010, the S Line (known then as Sugar House Streetcar) received a $26 million federal grant that allowed the street car to be completed in less than two years. It used an existing rail line running along 2200 South from the Central Pointe TRAX station to approximately 1100 East, near the primary Sugar House shopping district. The first phase of the S Line opened on December 8, 2013.

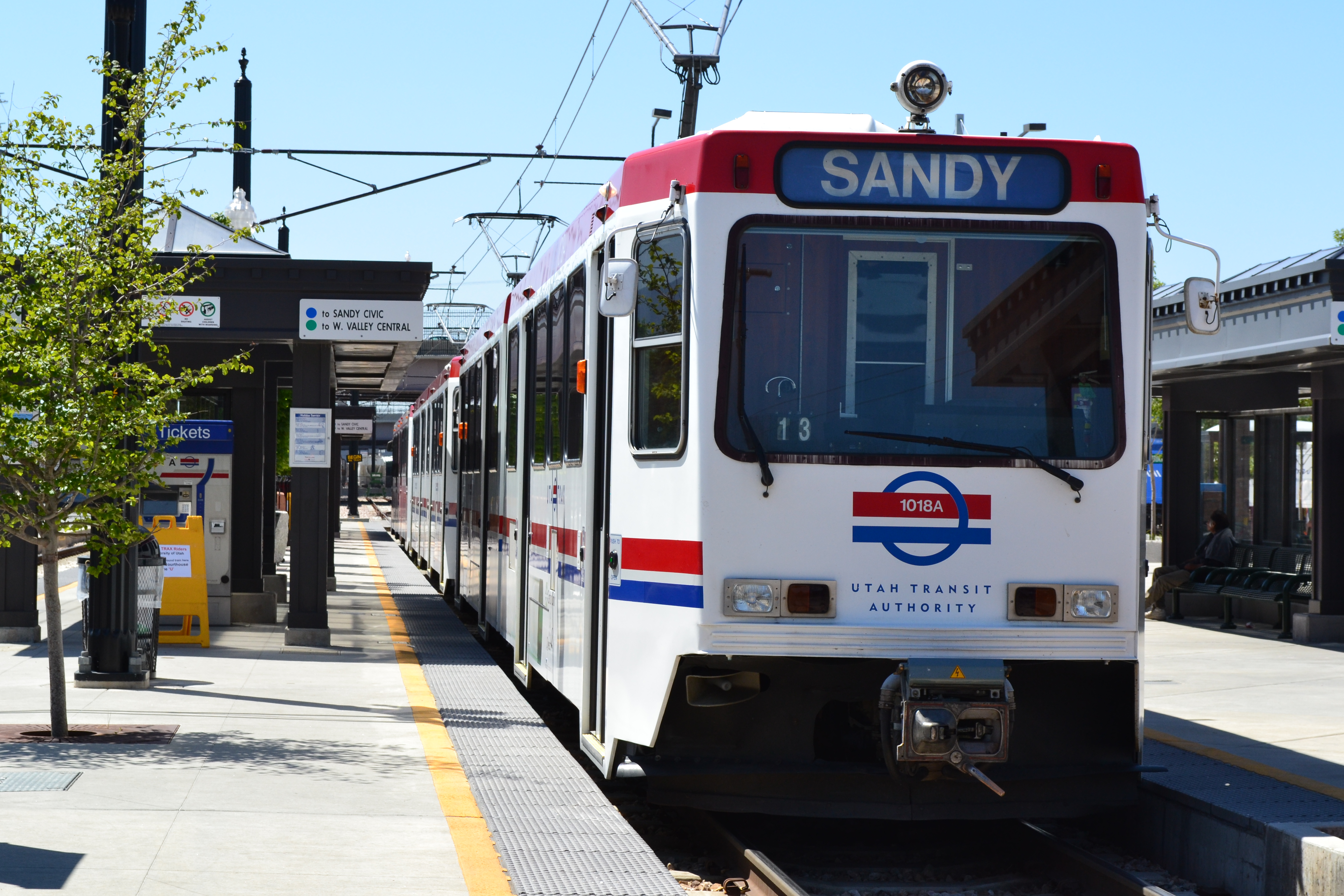
A Blue Line train at Salt Lake Central station, August 2011

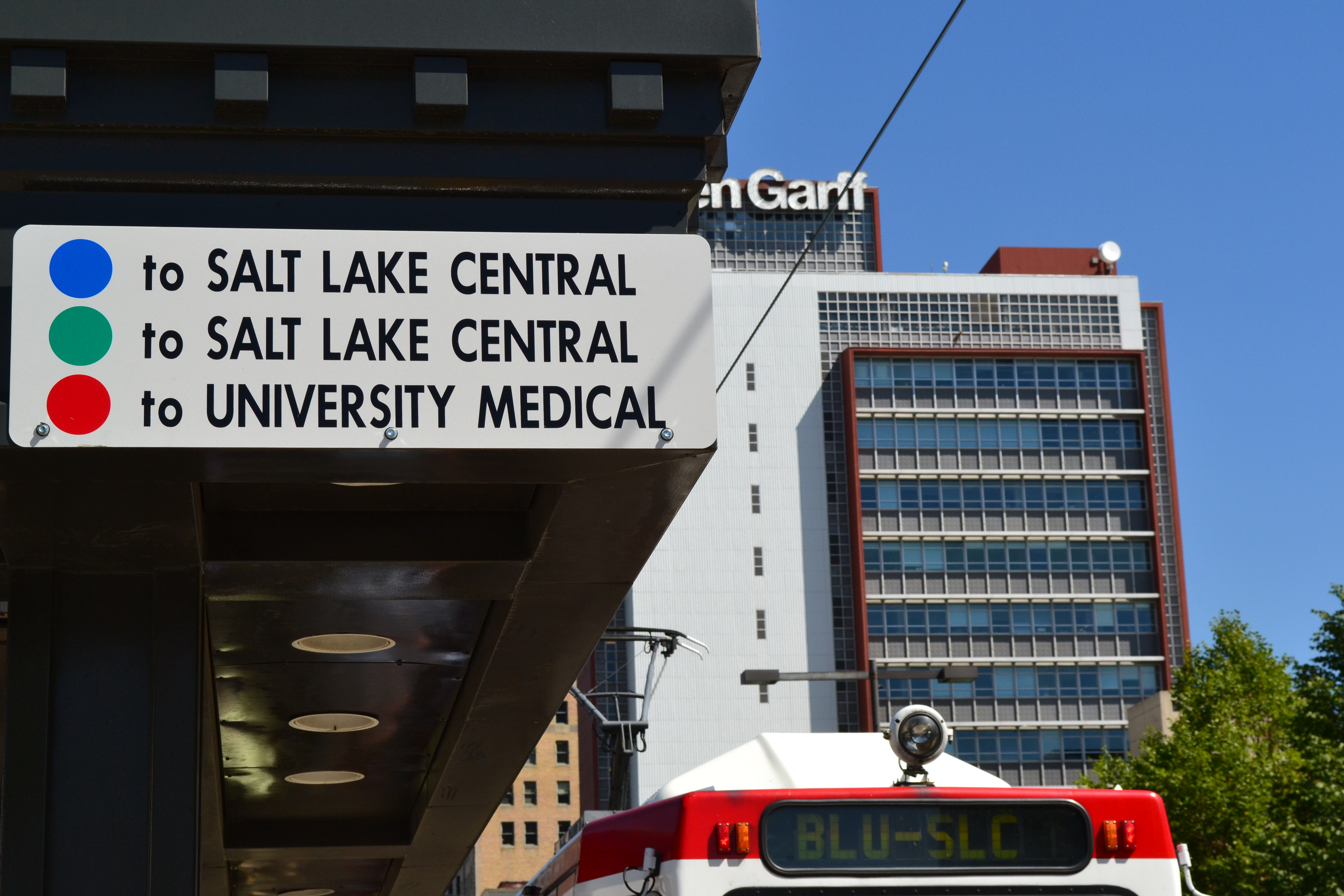
A sign at the Courthouse station indicates the terminus of each line heading north, August 2011. (Photo taken prior to the extension of the Green Line to the Salt Lake City International Airport).

== Future expansion ==
In 2023, UTA published its Light Rail Strategic Plan, which highlighted plans by the agency to build new tracks along both 400 South and 400 West in Downtown Salt Lake City, connecting to the existing TRAX network at Ballpark to the south, Courthouse to the east, and either Salt Lake Central or Planetarium to the west. This expansion is also planned to include new stations at Pioneer Park and within the Granery District. Once completed, this infrastructure is planned to allow for:

- Creation of a new Orange Line service between Salt Lake City International Airport and the University of Utah via Pioneer Park.
- A re-routing of the existing Red Line between Ballpark and Courthouse stations through the Granery District.
- Swapping the northern termini of the Blue and Green Lines, such that the Blue Line runs from Draper to the Airport, and the Green Line from West Valley Central to Salt Lake Central.

Additionally, the Strategic Plan highlights expansion of the TRAX network to the University of Utah Research Park, splitting off from the current system at University South Campus station. This new service would be provided by the proposed Orange Line. UTA proposes that these expansions be completed prior to Salt Lake City's hosting of the 2034 Winter Olympics.

UTA and the Utah Department of Transportation (UDOT) each independently commissioned a study, UTA first, then UDOT to look at potential transit solutions to the Point of the Mountain development at the former Utah State Prison complex. UTA determined BRT to be the preferred transit alternative, but was overridden by UDOT, who determined that Light Rail would be a better transportation solution, with higher ridership projections and development potential, despite the higher cost.

=== Other plans ===
In conjunction with the Mountain View Corridor project, plans were made by UTA to build a new TRAX line on the west side of the Salt Lake Valley along 5600 West (in the same general area as the Mountain View Corridor). The proposed line however hasn't gone through any studies, and isn't currently in UTA's future planning documents anymore. Instead a new Enhanced Bus along 5600 West was chosen and is currently in development with an expected opening date in Spring 2028.

In 2015, UTA announced plans to eventually expand the Red Line south from Daybreak. Initial proposals would have the line travel south to Herriman before either turning eastbound and passing through Riverton before terminating in Draper, or continuing south through Herriman toward the Rosecrest neighborhood and Zions Bank Stadium. Planned corridor preservation indicates continued interest in possibly extending the red line in the future, though such extension plans are absent from any future planning documents.

UTA has historically discussed proposals to extend the Blue Line from Draper to Lehi and eventually Orem, as well as creating a TRAX line to Davis County. However, both projects are currently being pursued as BRT lines, with the potential for conversion to light rail in the future if needed.

== Commercial advertising restrictions ==
UTA does not sell naming rights for its stations, nor does it allow stations to be named after commercial businesses. Commercial advertising on TRAX platforms is prohibited, in order for the passengers to be able to notice the safety information. One exception to this rule occurred during the 2002 Winter Olympics. For the duration of the games, the Arena and Temple Square stations were closed for security reasons, and during this time UTA allowed Coca-Cola to use the area of the unused Arena Station as part of its pin-trading center. The advertising restriction does not apply to the sides of the TRAX train cars or to UTA's buses. Not only does UTA have advertising signs on the sides and rear of many of its buses, it also has many buses where the painting scheme of the full rear or even the entire bus is an advertisement (bus wrap).

== Ridership ==
TRAX ridership
	Average weekday boardings	Annual percent change	Reference & notes
1999	8,600	-	
2000	19,100	122.09%	(Note: Data for THIRD quarter 2000, no ridership data reported by American Public Transportation Association (APTA) for UTA for fourth quarter)
2001	21,300	11.52%	(Note: Red Line (University extension) opened in December 2001)
2002	31,400	47.42%	
2003	38,000	27.39%	(Note: Red Line (University Medical Center extension) opened in September 2003)
2004	39,100	2.37%	
2005	53,400	36.57%	
2006	49,700	-6.93%	
2007	39,700	-20.12%	
2008	44,800	12.85%	(Note: The FrontRunner opened in April 2008)
2009	43,400	-3.12%	
2010	47,300	8.99%	
2011	59,100	24.95%	(Note: Red Line Mid-Jordan extension and Green Line West Valley extension both opened in August 2011)
2012	60,600	2.54%	(Note: The FrontRunner South extension opened in December 2012)
2013	68,100	12.38%	(Note: Green Line Airport extension opened in April 2013, Blue Line Draper extension opened in August 2013, and S Line opened in December 2013)
2014	68,500	0.59%	
2015	67,300	-1.75%	
2016	64,300	-4.46%	
2017	61,655	-4.11%	
2018	58,454	-5.19%	
2019	54,860	-6.15%	
2020	26,724	-51.29%	
2021	26,984	0.86%	
2022	34,354	27.31%	
2023	35,181	2.41%	
2024	37,013	5.21%	

== See also ==
- Utah Transit Authority
- Transportation in Salt Lake City
- FrontRunner – commuter rail system
- S Line (formerly known as Sugar House Streetcar)
- List of tram and light rail transit systems
