= List of TRAX stations =

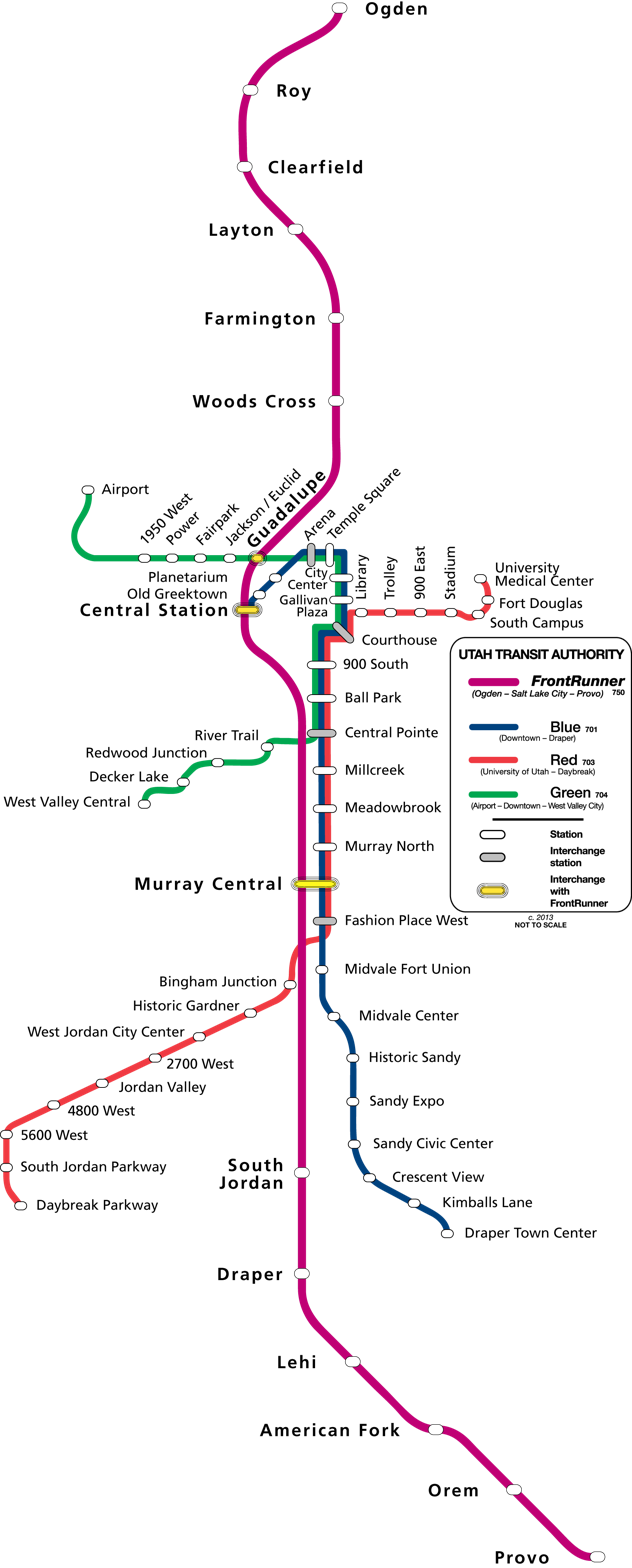
A map of the entire UTA rail system as of August 2013

TRAX is a light rail system operated by the Utah Transit Authority (UTA), serving much of the Salt Lake Valley in Utah, United States. It has 52 stations on a network of three lines that converge in Salt Lake City. Other cities served by the service include Draper, Midvale, Murray, Sandy, South Jordan, South Salt Lake, West Jordan, and West Valley City.

== Description ==
The network consists of three lines: the Blue Line (previously referred to as the Sandy Line), which opened in 1999; the Red Line (previously referred to as the University Line), which opened in 2001; and the Green Line, which opened in 2011. The TRAX lines were given their present names in 2011 after the system transitioned to using colors as identifiers.

In 2025, TRAX trains carried a total of 13,279,100 passengers and averaged 43,400 on weekdays in the fourth quarter. It ranked tenth among light rail systems in the United States. There are 52 stations on the 3 lines of the UTA TRAX system, with an overall length of 44.8 miles (72.1 km) for the entire network.

The stations along the UTA TRAX network are open-air structures featuring passenger canopies for protection from adverse weather. Many of the canopies are designed to resemble the canopy at the Joseph Smith Memorial Building (which is located Downtown and listed on the National Register of Historic Places). Works of public art included at several stations were developed as part of the UTA's Art in Transit program. At first the program was met with skepticism; initially, only the stations constructed in Salt Lake City incorporated public art into their designs. This was the case as the city was initially the only one to take part in the Art in Transit program. The program has since grown in popularity, and many of the stations constructed as part of the FrontLines 2015 expansion will include public art in their final design.

Nearly all stations, except those in Downtown Salt Lake City, have a Park and Ride lot with free parking. TRAX Park and Ride lots may have as few as six parking spaces or as many as nearly 1200. Many of the Downtown Salt Lake City stations are located within the Free Fare Zone which allows riders that both enter and exit TRAX and/or UTA buses service within the Zone to ride with no charge. Stations within the Zone include Arena, City Center, Courthouse, Gallivan Plaza, Library, Old GreekTown, Planetarium, Salt Lake Central, and Temple Square.

All of UTA's TRAX and FrontRunner trains and stations, streetcars and streetcar stops, and all fixed route buses are compliant with Americans with Disabilities Act and are therefore accessible to those with disabilities. Signage at the stations, on the passenger platforms, and on the trains clearly indicate accessibility options. Ramps on the passenger platforms on the Blue Line and assistance from the train operator may be necessary for wheelchair boarding (weekdays only). These ramps are not used on weekends nor on the Red or Green Lines. In accordance with the Utah Clean Air Act and UTA ordinance, "smoking is prohibited on UTA vehicles as well as UTA bus stops, TRAX stations, and FrontRunner stations".

== History ==
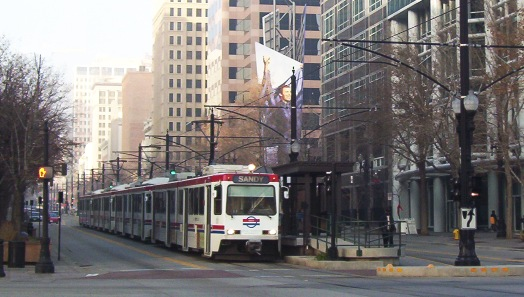
Blue Line train at Gallivan Plaza station, December 2004

UTA's TRAX began service on December 4, 1999, with the opening of what was then called the Sandy/Salt Lake Line (now called the Blue Line) which ran from Sandy Civic Center to Delta Center (now called Arena). The line saw construction of a pair of infill stations with the opening of 900 South in 2005 and Sandy Expo in 2006 and the 600 South in 2022 as a result of demand for additional service. The University Line (TRAX) commenced service on 15 December 2001 between Stadium and Delta Center. The line expanded in April 2008, when three new stations opened between Planetarium and Salt Lake Central. The Sandy/University Line began service on December 17, 2001, between Stadium and Sandy Civic Center. Originally operating on a limited schedule, by August 2009, trains were added to the line serving all stations between Sandy Civic Center and University Medical Center. Expansion as part of the FrontLines 2015 project saw the completion of an additional 25.2 miles (40.6 km) of track by August 2013. The completion of the Airport and Draper extensions added service to the Salt Lake City International Airport and Draper.

Salt Lake Central (which is part of the Salt Lake City Intermodal Hub) connects with FrontRunner commuter rail (with service from Weber County through Davis County and Salt Lake County to Utah County), as well as Amtrak and Greyhound Lines. In addition Murray Central and North Temple Bridge/Guadalupe also connect with FrontRunner. In December 2013 the first phase of the S Line (formerly known as Sugar House Streetcar) project opened for service with a connection at Central Pointe in South Salt Lake.

== Stations ==
Station Name	Servicing Rail Line(s)	Jurisdiction	Date Opened	Park & Ride Spaces	UTA Bus Routes (Note: Bus connections only include routes that stop at, or immediately adjacent to, the station and not routes that may have stops "nearby".) (Note: Bus routes are current as of Change Day, 8 December 2013)	Reference
600 South	Blue Line; Red Line; Green Line	Salt Lake City	July 26, 2022	None		
900 East	Red Line	Salt Lake City	December 15, 2001	None	4, 209, 455	
900 South	Blue Line; Red Line; Green Line	Salt Lake City	May 19, 2005	None	9	
1940 West North Temple	Green Line	Salt Lake City	April 14, 2013	None	217, 417, 451, F453, 551	
2700 West Sugar Factory Road	Red Line	West Jordan	August 7, 2011	204	227	
4800 West Old Bingham Highway	Red Line	West Jordan	August 7, 2011	244	248	
5600 West Old Bingham Highway	Red Line	West Jordan	August 7, 2011	420		
Airport †	Green Line	Salt Lake City	April 14, 2013	None		
Arena * $	Blue Line; Green Line	Salt Lake City	December 4, 1999	None	205	
Ballpark	Blue Line; Red Line; Green Line	Salt Lake City	December 4, 1999	170		
Bingham Junction	Red Line	Midvale	August 7, 2011	200	F570	
Central Pointe *	Blue Line; Red Line; Green Line; S Line	South Salt Lake	December 4, 1999	57	17, 21	
City Center $	Blue Line; Green Line	Salt Lake City	December 4, 1999	None		
Courthouse * $	Blue Line; Red Line; Green Line	Salt Lake City	December 4, 1999	None	451	
Crescent View	Blue Line	Sandy	August 18, 2013	247		
Daybreak Parkway †	Red Line	South Jordan	August 7, 2011	400	126	
Decker Lake	Green Line	West Valley City	August 7, 2011	750		
Draper Town Center †	Blue Line	Draper	August 18, 2013	438	126	
Fairpark	Green Line	Salt Lake City	April 14, 2013	Yes	451, F453	
Fashion Place West *	Blue Line; Red Line	Murray	December 4, 1999	100	62, 209, F202	
Fort Douglas	Red Line	Salt Lake City	September 29, 2003	None		
Gallivan Plaza $	Blue Line; Green Line	Salt Lake City	December 4, 1999	None	1, 2, 4, 205, 209, 220	
Historic Gardner	Red Line	West Jordan	August 7, 2011	130	F578	
Historic Sandy	Blue Line	Sandy	December 4, 1999	316	F94, F590, 994	
Jackson/Euclid	Green Line	Salt Lake City	April 14, 2013	None	1, 451, F453	
Jordan Valley	Red Line	West Jordan	August 7, 2011	845	F232, 240, F590	
Kimballs Lane	Blue Line	Draper	August 18, 2013	251		
Library $	Red Line	Salt Lake City	December 15, 2001	None	4, 455, 473	
Meadowbrook	Blue Line; Red Line	South Salt Lake	December 4, 1999	497	39	
Midvale Center	Blue Line	Midvale	December 4, 1999	142	213, F525, F578	
Midvale Fort Union	Blue Line	Midvale	December 4, 1999	266	72, CS1	
Millcreek	Blue Line; Red Line	South Salt Lake	December 4, 1999	101	33, 35	
Murray Central‡	Blue Line; Red Line	Murray	December 4, 1999	750	45, 50X, 54, 200, 201	
Murray North	Blue Line; Red Line	Murray	December 4, 1999	235	47, 205	
North Temple Bridge/Guadalupe‡	Green Line	Salt Lake City	April 14, 2013	None	200, 223, F453	
Old GreekTown $	Blue Line	Salt Lake City	April 27, 2008	None	2, 209, 220, 509	
Planetarium $	Blue Line	Salt Lake City	April 27, 2008	None		
Power	Green Line	Salt Lake City	April 14, 2013	None	1, 205, 451, F453, 551	
Redwood Junction	Green Line	West Valley City	August 7, 2011	6-9	217	
River Trail	Green Line	West Valley City	August 7, 2011	100		
Salt Lake Central † $ (Salt Lake Intermodal Hub)	Blue Line; FrontRunner	Salt Lake City	April 27, 2008	Very limited	2, 209, 220, 509	
Sandy Civic Center	Blue Line	Sandy	December 4, 1999	1185	201, 219, F514, F525, 871	
Sandy Expo	Blue Line	Sandy	August 28, 2006	None		
South Jordan Downtown	Red Line	South Jordan	March 26, 2025	None		
South Jordan Parkway	Red Line	South Jordan	August 7, 2011	200		
Stadium	Red Line	Salt Lake City	December 15, 2001	None	4, 213, 220, 455, 473	
Temple Square $	Blue Line; Green Line	Salt Lake City	December 4, 1999	None	1	
Trolley	Red Line	Salt Lake City	December 15, 2001	None	4, 455	
University Medical Center †	Red Line	Salt Lake City	September 29, 2003	Limited	9, 17, 21, 213, 223, 473	
University South Campus	Red Line	Salt Lake City	September 29, 2003	None	9, 17, 213, 455, 473	
West Jordan City Center	Red Line	West Jordan	August 7, 2011	221	217, 218	
West Valley Central †	Green Line	West Valley City	August 7, 2011	80	35, 39, 47, 50X, F232, 240, 248, 509, 513,	

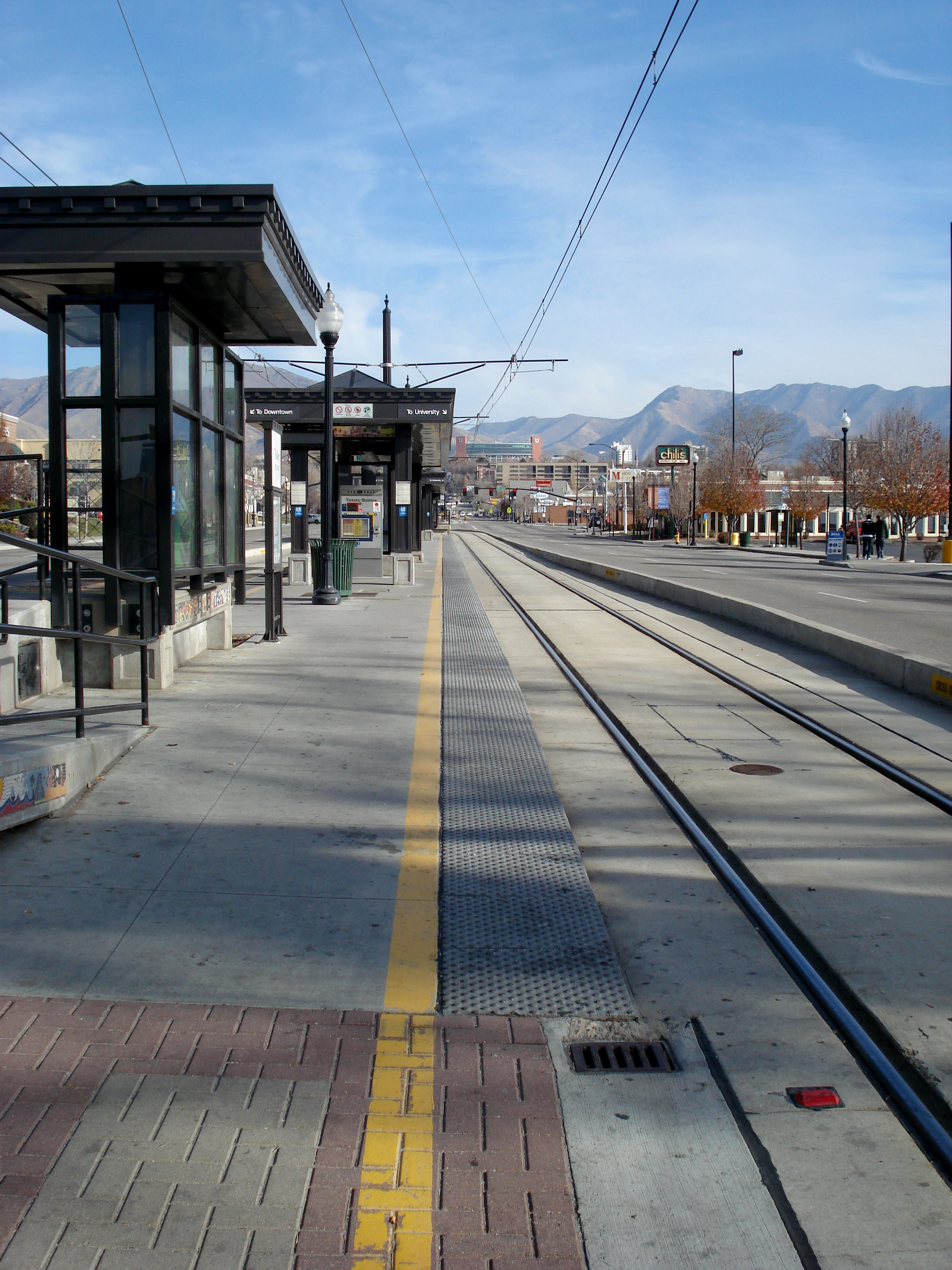
Trolley station, November 2007

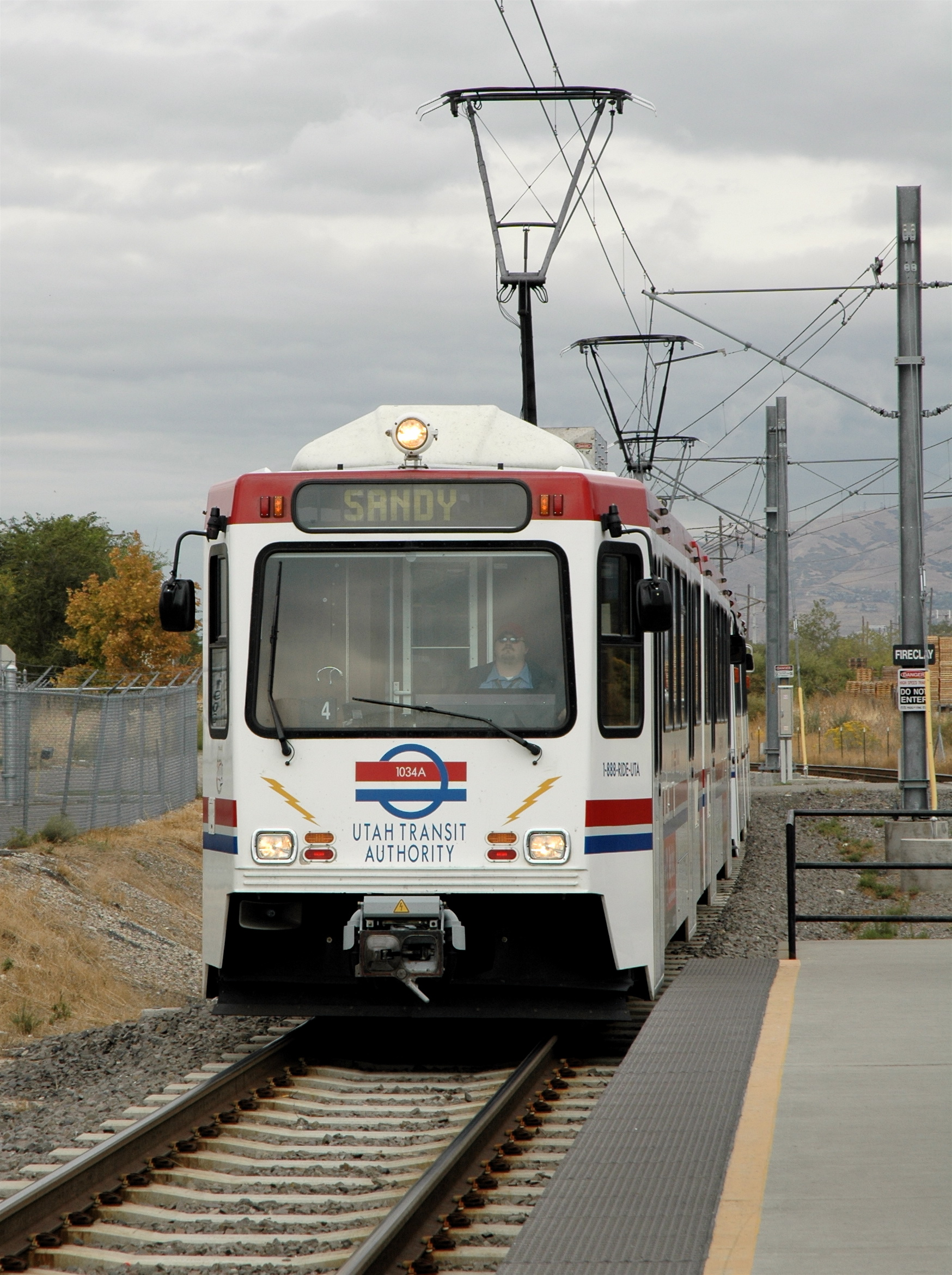
Blue Line train at Murray North station, October 2005

*	Official transfer stations between TRAX lines
†	Terminal stations
$	Stations within the Free Fare Zone
‡	750 FrontRunner connection at adjacent station

== Future stations ==
Station Name	Rail Line(s) Servicing	Jurisdiction	Projected completion	Reference
14600 South†	701 TRAX Blue Line	Draper	Not yet scheduled	
300 South	710 TRAX Orange Line	Salt Lake City	Not yet scheduled	
300 West	703 TRAX Red Line	Salt Lake City	Not yet scheduled	
600 South	703 TRAX Red Line	Salt Lake City	Not yet scheduled	
800 South	703 TRAX Red Line	Salt Lake City	Not yet scheduled	
Pioneer Park	703 TRAX Red Line 710 TRAX Orange Line	Salt Lake City	Not yet scheduled	
Highland	701 TRAX Blue Line	Draper	Not yet scheduled	
West Temple	703 TRAX Red Line 710 TRAX Orange Line	Salt Lake City	Not yet scheduled	
