= Murray Central station =

Light rail and commuter rail station in Murray, Utah, United States

Murray Central Murray
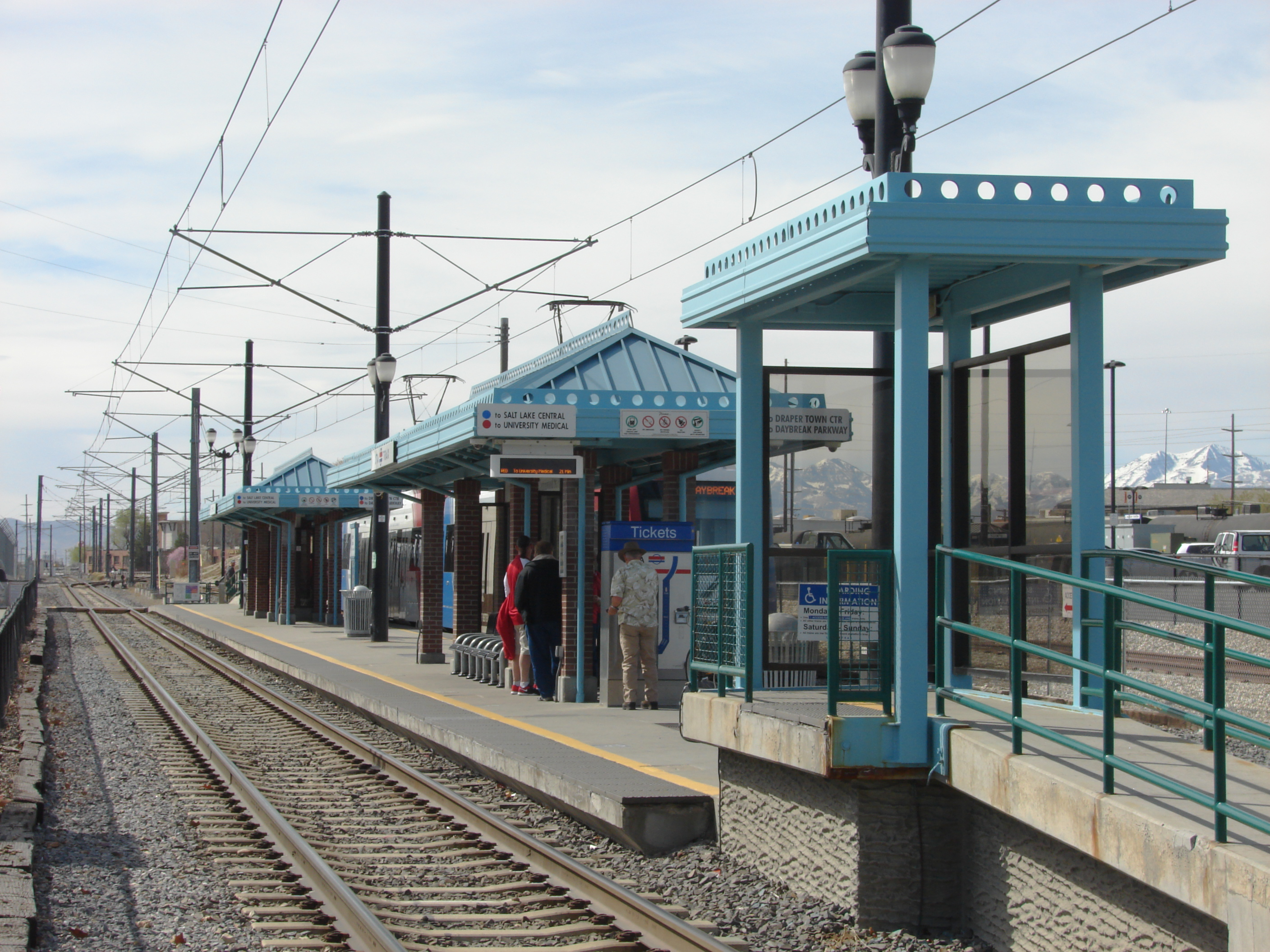
- Murray Central station TRAX platform, March 2015

General information
- Location: TRAX: 5144 Cottonwood Street; FrontRunner: 40 West Vine Street; Murray, Utah; United States
- Coordinates: 40.659870°N 111.895929°W
- Owner: Utah Transit Authority (UTA)
- Platforms: 1 island platform (TRAX); 1 island platform (FrontRunner)
- Tracks: 2 (TRAX); 2 (FrontRunner)
- Connections: UTA: MVX , 45, 54, 200, 201

Construction
- Structure type: At-grade
- Parking: 1,095 spaces (combined with FrontRunner station)
- Cycle facilities: 4 lockers
- Accessible: Yes

History
- Opened: December 4, 1999; 26 years ago

Services
Preceding station	Utah Transit Authority	Following station
Murray North toward Ogden Central	FrontRunner	Fashion Place West toward Provo Central
Murray North toward Salt Lake Central	Blue Line	Fashion Place West toward Draper Town Center
Salt Lake Central toward University Medical Center	Red Line	South Jordan toward Daybreak Parkway
Former services
Preceding station	Utah Transit Authority	Following station
Murray North toward University Medical Center	Sandy/University Line	Fashion Place West toward Sandy Civic Center
Location

Murray Cental station (signed as just Murray station for the FrontRunner) is a light rail and commuter rail station in Murray, Utah, United States, that is served by the Blue and Red lines of Utah Transit Authority's (UTA) TRAX light rail system that operates in Salt Lake County and FrontRunner, which operates along the Wasatch Front with service from Ogden in central Weber County through Davis County, Salt Lake City, and Salt Lake County to Provo in central Utah County. It is part of the FrontRunner South extension. The Blue Line provides service from Downtown Salt Lake City south to Draper, while the Red Line provides service from the University of Utah to the Daybreak community of South Jordan.

== Description ==
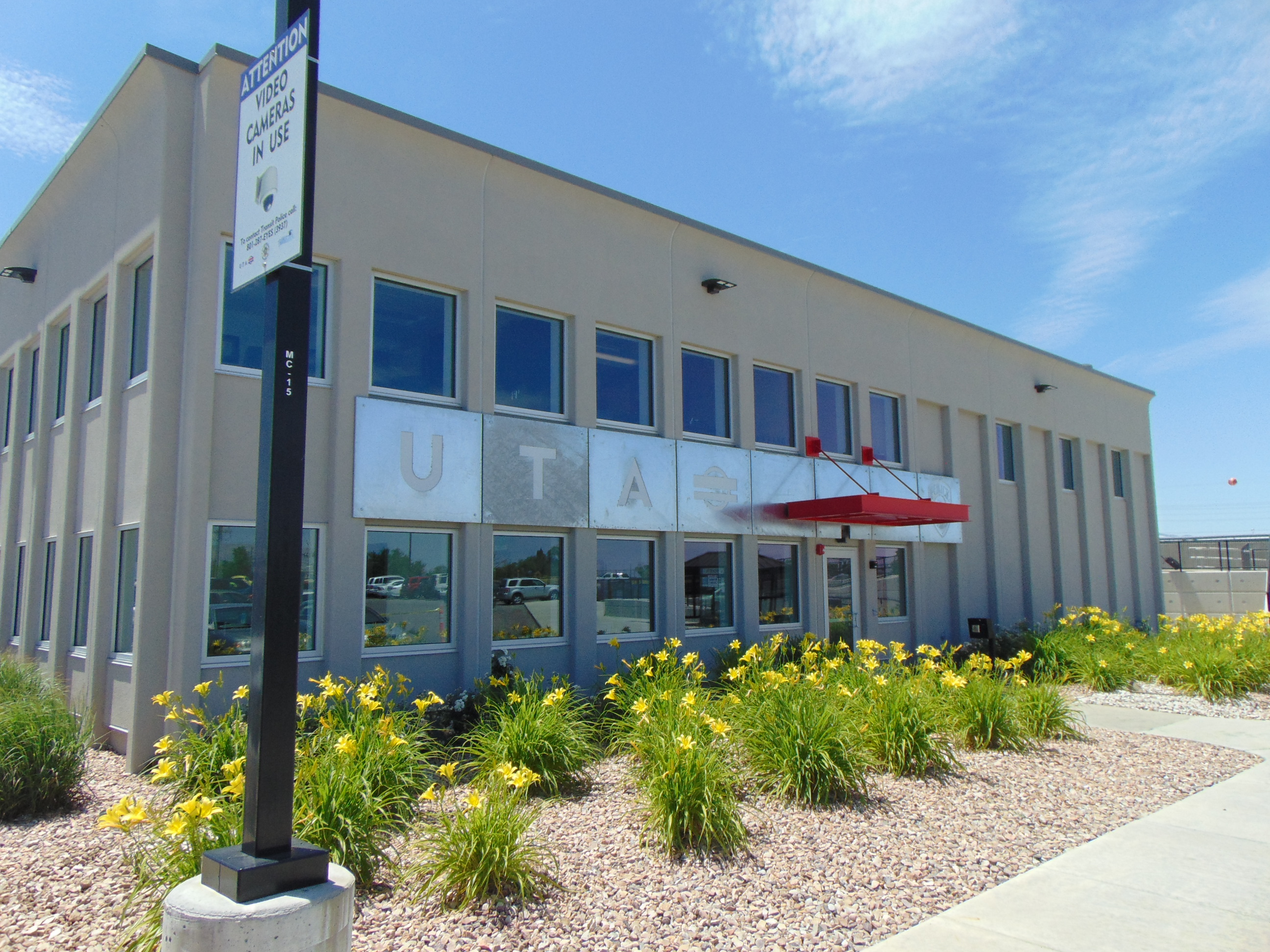
The Utah Transit Authority Police station, adjacent to the Murray Central station, July 2016

The station is located at 5144 Cottonwood Street and is accessed from either East Vine Street on the north or West 5300 South (SR-173/Spartan Street) at 100 West. To the east of the station is the Intermountain Medical Center complex, with its large parking lot. Between the two stations' free park and ride lots, there are nearly 1,100 parking spaces available. The adjacent Intermoutain Medical Center was built on the site of the former Murray Smelter. The Murray Downtown Historic District is across Little Cottonwood Creek to the northeast. The station is located within the FrontRunner's quiet zone, so FrontRunner trains do not routinely sound their horns when approaching public crossings within this corridor. The TRAX station opened on December 4, 1999, while the FrontRunner station opened, along with the rest of the FrontRunner South, on December 10, 2012.
