= 5600 West Old Bingham Highway station =

Light rail station in West Jordan, Utah, United States

5600 W. Old Bingham Highway
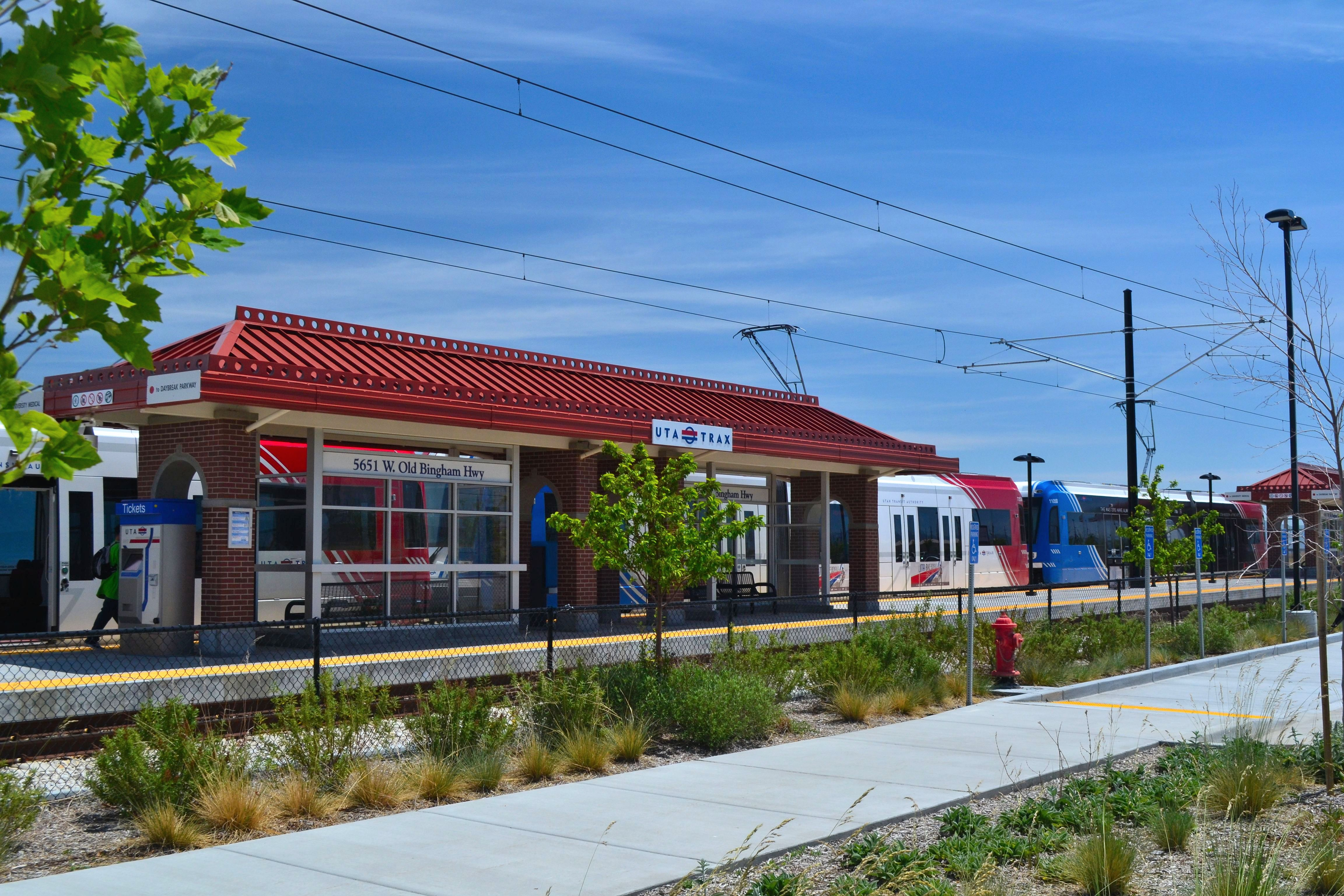
- 5600 West Old Bingham Highway station platform

General information
- Location: 5651 West Old Bingham Highway; West Jordan, Utah; United States
- Coordinates: 40°34′09″N 112°01′29″W
- Owner: Utah Transit Authority (UTA)
- Platforms: 1 island platform
- Tracks: 2

Construction
- Structure type: At-grade
- Parking: 420 spaces
- Accessible: Yes

History
- Opened: August 7, 2011; 15 years ago

Services
Preceding station	Utah Transit Authority	Following station
4800 West Old Bingham Highway toward University Medical Center	Red Line	South Jordan Parkway toward Daybreak Parkway
Location

5600 West Old Bingham Highway station is a light rail station in West Jordan, Utah, United States, served by the Red Line of the Utah Transit Authority's (UTA) TRAX light rail system. The Red Line provides service from the University of Utah to the Daybreak community of South Jordan.

== Description ==
The station is located at 5651 West Old Bingham Highway and is accessible from that roadway. It is also slightly northeast of the Mountain View Corridor (SR-85)/Old Bingham Highway interchange. The station has a free park and ride lot with 420 parking spaces available, but there are plans for more than 620 parking spaces. In the early planning stages, the station was referred to as "5600 West Station", but later changed to the current name. Notwithstanding, the signage at the station (the Park and Ride and the passenger platform) indicates "5651 W. Old Bingham Hwy". The station opened August 7, 2011, as part of the Red Line (Mid-Jordan) and is operated by the Utah Transit Authority.
