= Bingham Junction station =

Light rail station in Midvale, Utah, United States

Bingham Junction
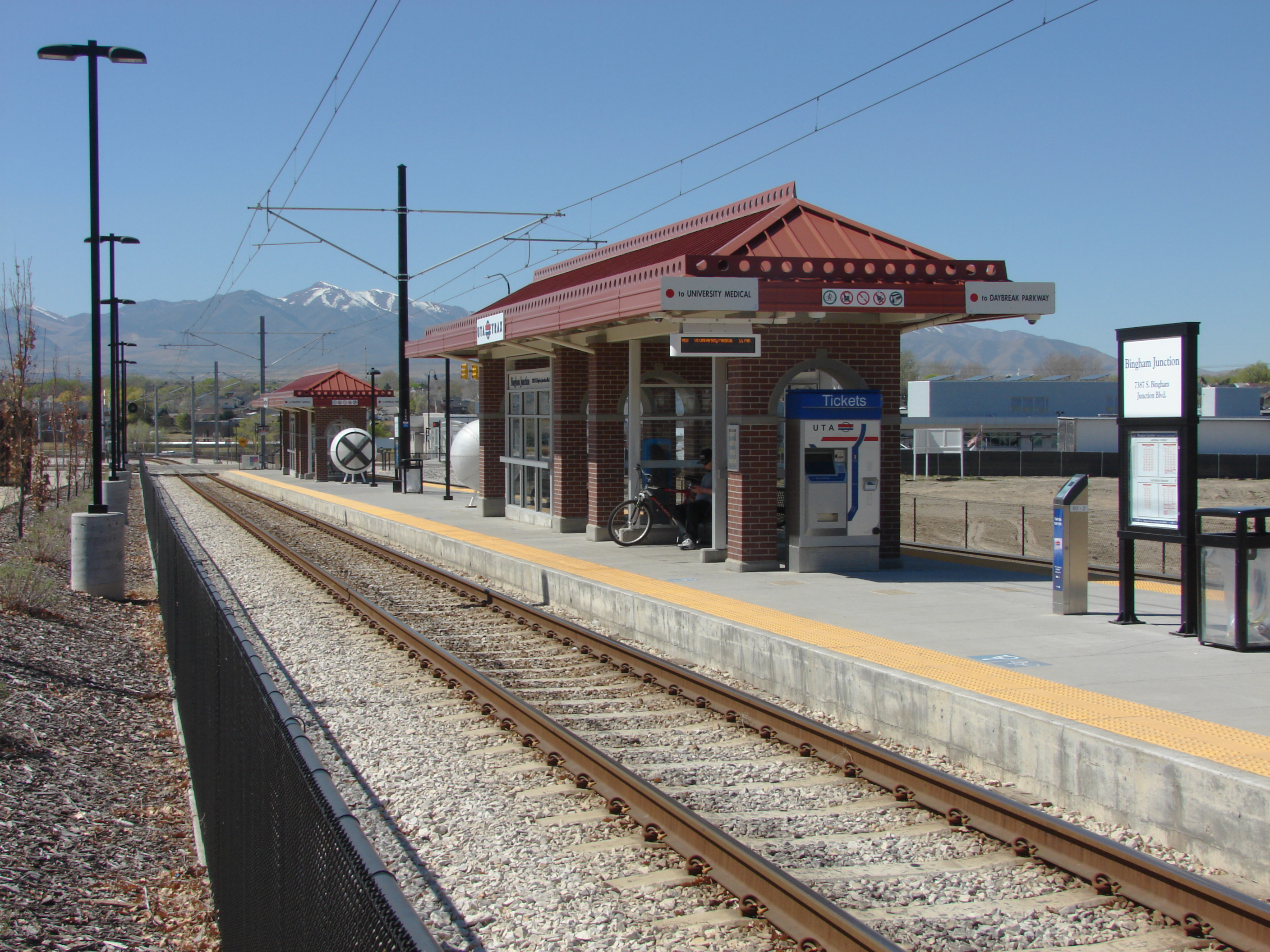
- Bingham Junction station platform

General information
- Location: 7387 South Bingham Junction Boulevard; Midvale, Utah; United States
- Coordinates: 40°37′02″N 111°54′54″W
- Owner: Utah Transit Authority (UTA)
- Platforms: 1 island platform
- Tracks: 2
- Connections: UTA: F570

Construction
- Structure type: At-grade
- Parking: 200 spaces
- Accessible: Yes

History
- Opened: August 7, 2011; 15 years ago

Services
Preceding station	Utah Transit Authority	Following station
Fashion Place West toward University Medical Center	Red Line	Historic Gardner toward Daybreak Parkway
Location

Bingham Junction station is a light rail station in Midvale, Utah, United States, served by the Red Line of the Utah Transit Authority's (UTA) TRAX light rail system. The Red Line provides service from the University of Utah to the Daybreak community of South Jordan.

== Description ==
The station is located at 7387 South Bingham Junction Boulevard (approximately 930 West), about midway between the Jordan River and Interstate 15. Bingham Junction Boulevard is easily accessed from Jordan River Boulevard (7000 South/7200 South [SR-48]) on the north and 7720 South (West Center Street) on the south. The station situated in the middle of a large, former superfund site (approaching a square mile in size) associated with Midvale's industrial past (especially smelting), but recent redevelopment of the area includes transit-oriented residential areas to the south, commercial developments to the west, and a retail area far to the north (visible across brownfield). The station is also UTA's closest to Midvale's historic downtown, but any direct route to it for pedestrians remains blocked by a fenced right-of-way for a railroad spur.

The station's name refers to the connection between the Union Pacific Railroad's Provo Subdivision (previously the Denver and Rio Grande Western Railroad's Utah Division), which still exists (for the use of the Savage Bingham and Garfield Railroad freight service) a few blocks east of the station. Bingham Junction has a Park and Ride lot with 200 free parking spaces available. The station opened August 7, 2011, as part of the Red Line (Mid-Jordan) and is operated by the Utah Transit Authority.
