= West Jordan City Center station =

Light rail station in West Jordan, Utah, United States

West Jordan City Center
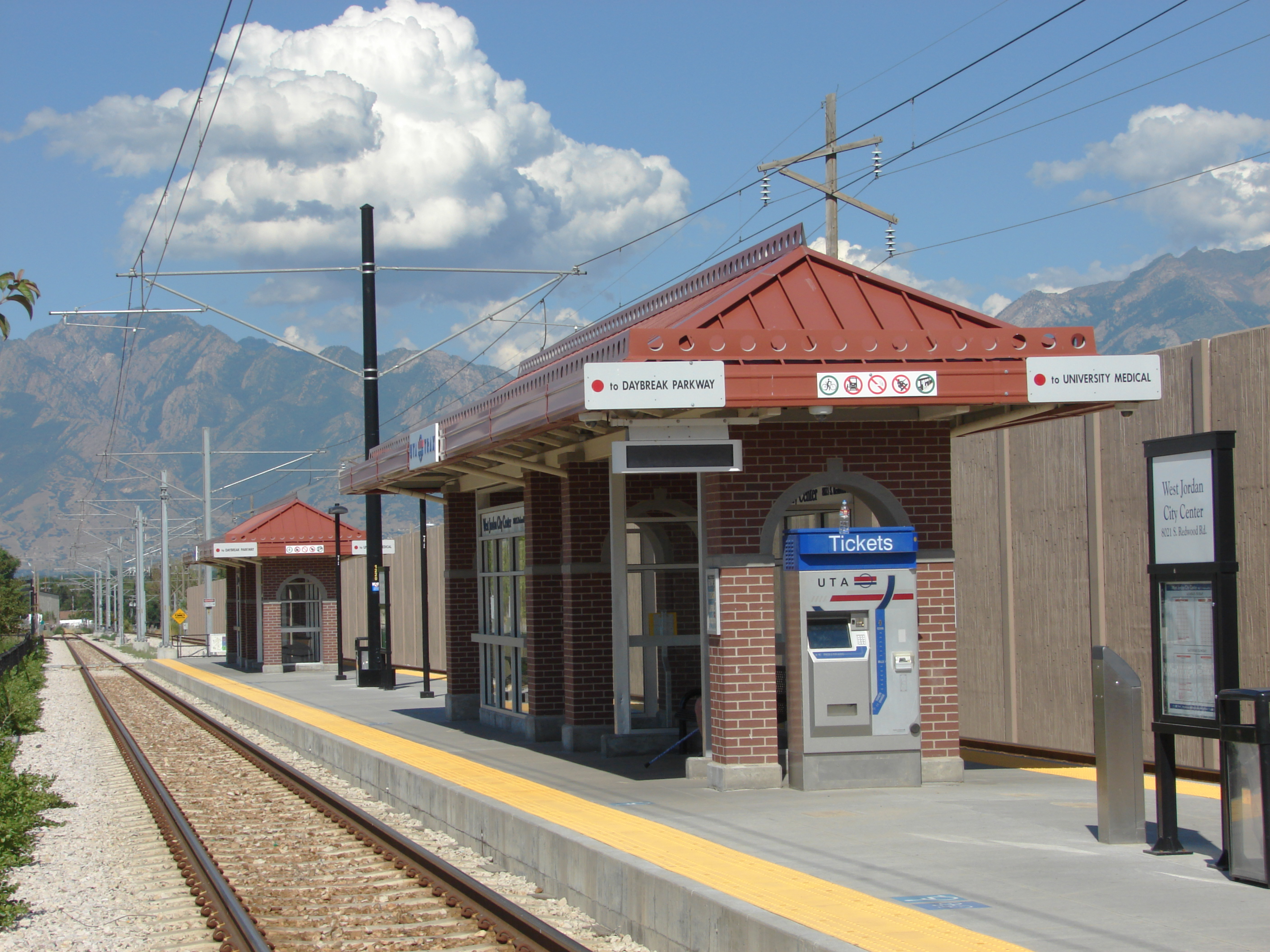
- West Jordan City Center station platform

General information
- Location: 8021 South Redwood Road; West Jordan, Utah; United States
- Coordinates: 40°36′18″N 111°56′11″W
- Owner: Utah Transit Authority (UTA)
- Platforms: 1 island platform
- Tracks: 2
- Connections: UTA: 217, 218

Construction
- Structure type: At-grade
- Parking: 221 spaces
- Accessible: Yes

History
- Opened: August 7, 2011; 15 years ago

Services
Preceding station	Utah Transit Authority	Following station
Historic Gardner toward University Medical Center	Red Line	2700 West Sugar Factory Road toward Daybreak Parkway
Location

West Jordan City Center station is a light rail station in the West Jordan, Utah, United States, served by the Red Line of the Utah Transit Authority's (UTA) TRAX light rail system. The Red Line provides service from the University of Utah to the Daybreak community of South Jordan.

== Description ==
The station is located at 8021 South Redwood Road (1700 West/SR-68) and is accessible from 7800 South (SR-48) by heading south on Redwood Road. There is not access to the station except directly from Redwood Road. The West Jordan city hall, West Jordan courthouse, West Jordan Branch of the Salt Lake County Library, a Jordan School District administration building, and a small commercial area are to the north of the tracks near the station. The area south of the station is mostly residential and, although the station runs along the north side of 8045 South, there is not direct vehicle or pedestrian access to that road. The station has a Park and Ride with about free 220 parking spaces available, but there are plans for a total of about 600 parking spaces. In the early planning stages, the station was referred to as "Redwood Road", but later changed to the current name, possibly to avoid confusion with Redwood Junction station on the Green Line further north. The station opened August 7, 2011 as part of the Red Line (Mid-Jordan) and is operated by the Utah Transit Authority.
