= Historic Gardner station =

Light rail station in West Jordan, Utah, United States

Historic Gardner
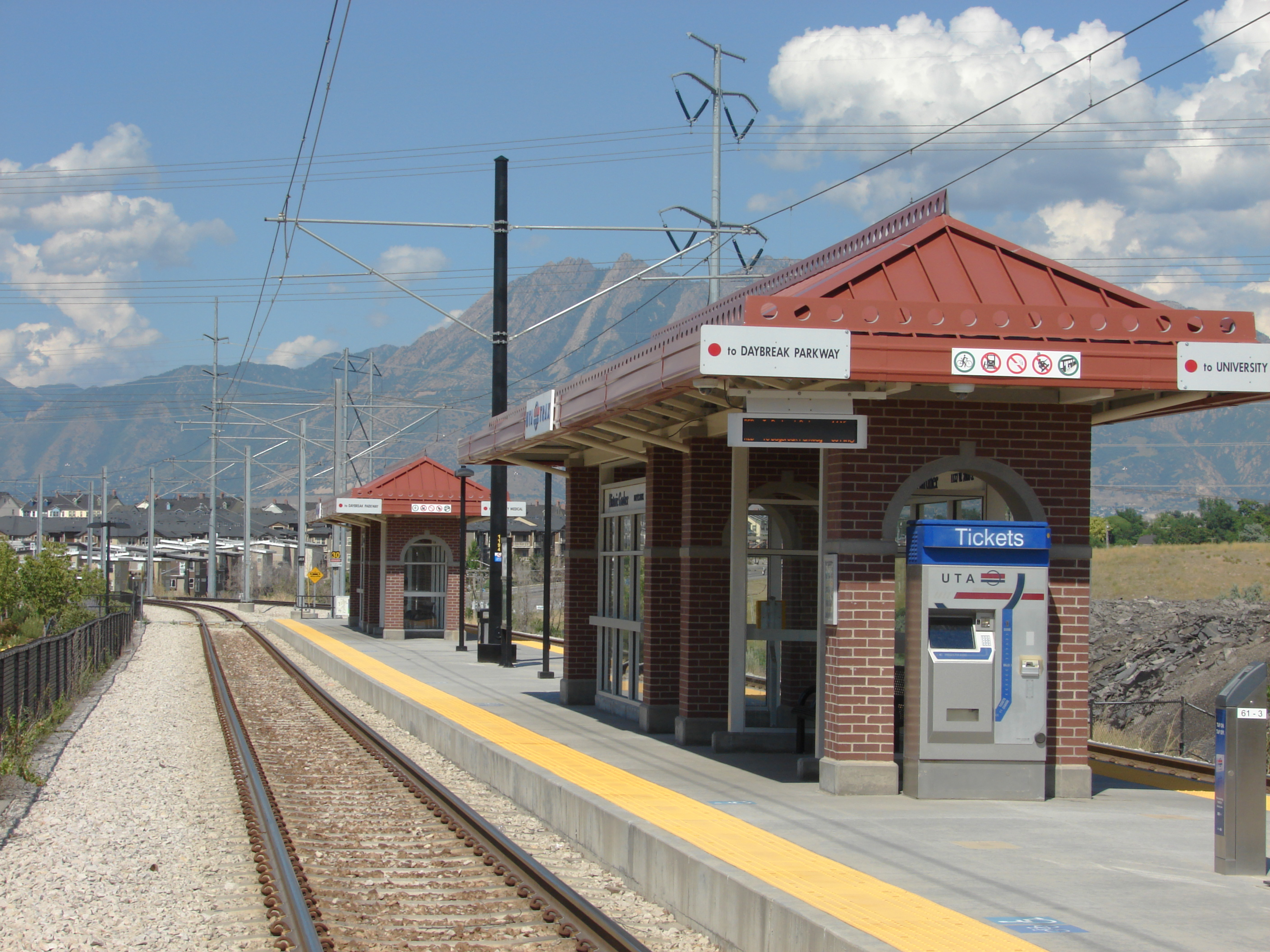

General information
- Location: 1127 West 7800 South; West Jordan, Utah; United States
- Coordinates: 40°36′29″N 111°55′27″W
- Owner: Utah Transit Authority (UTA)
- Platforms: 1 island platform
- Tracks: 2
- Connections: UTA: F578

Construction
- Structure type: At-grade
- Parking: 130 spaces
- Accessible: Yes

History
- Opened: August 7, 2011; 15 years ago

Services
Preceding station	Utah Transit Authority	Following station
Bingham Junction toward University Medical Center	Red Line	West Jordan City Center toward Daybreak Parkway
Location

Historic Gardner station is a light rail station in West Jordan, Utah, United States, served by the Utah Transit Authority's (UTA) TRAX light rail system Red Line. The Red Line provides service from the University of Utah to the Daybreak community of South Jordan.

== Description ==
The station is located at 1127 West 7800 South and is accessible from that road. The station is situated just west of the Jordan River east of the historic West Jordan Ward Meetinghouse and the West Jordan City Cemetery. The historic Gardner Mill and the Gardner Village shopping area are across the street to the north. The station also provides access to the Jordan River Parkway trail. The station has a Park and Ride lot with about 130 spaces, but there are possible plans for an additional 120 parking spaces that would be shared with Gardner Village. In the early planning stages, the station was referred to as "Gardner Village", but later changed to the current name. The station opened August 7, 2011 as part of the Red Line (Mid-Jordan) and is operated by the Utah Transit Authority.
