= 2700 West Sugar Factory Road station =

Light rail station in West Jordan, Utah, United States

2700 W. Sugar Factory Road
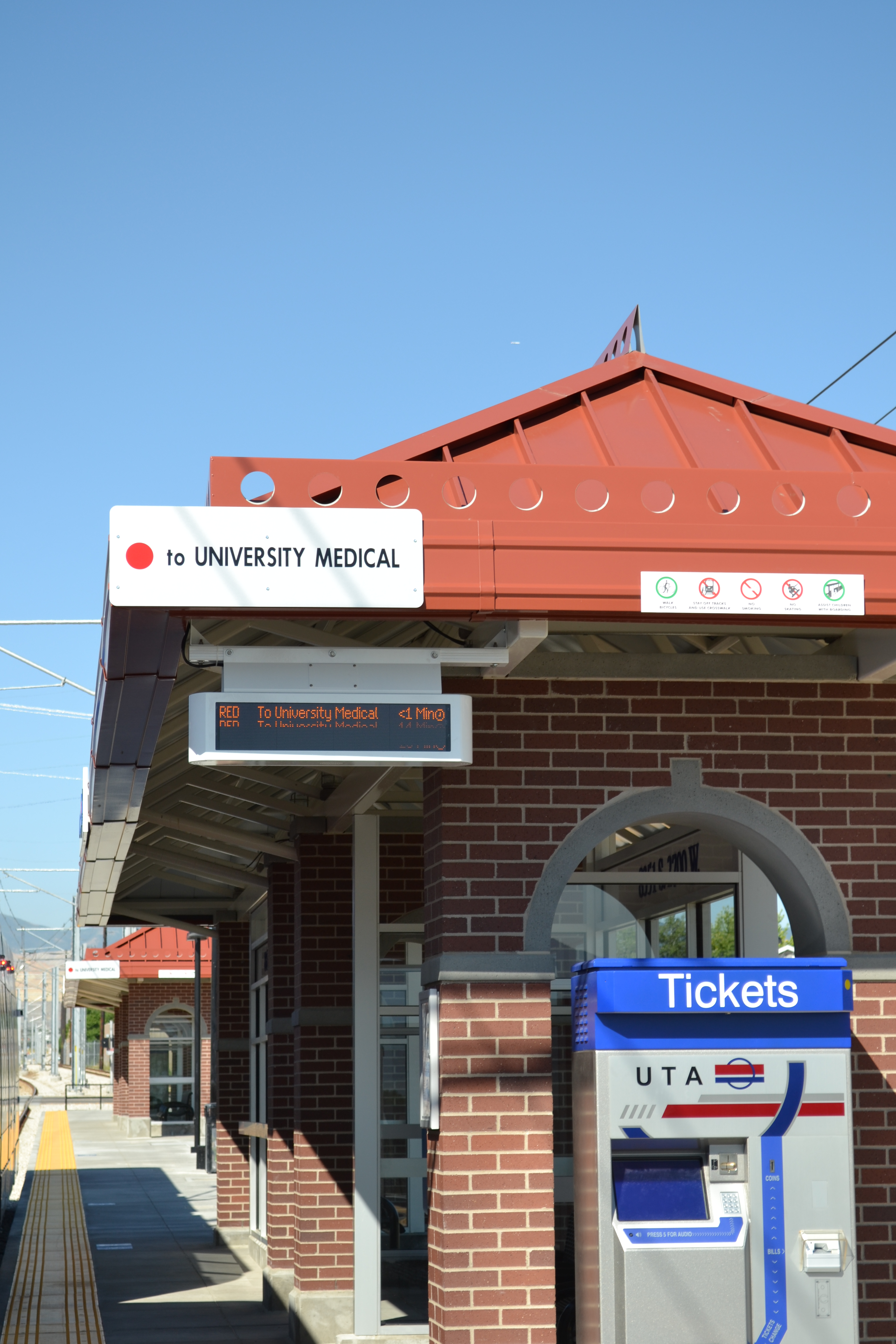
- 2700 West Sugar Factory Road station platform

General information
- Location: 8351 South 2700 West; West Jordan, Utah; United States
- Coordinates: 40°35′57″N 111°57′24″W
- Owner: Utah Transit Authority (UTA)
- Platforms: 1 island platform
- Tracks: 2
- Connections: UTA: 227

Construction
- Structure type: At-grade
- Parking: 204 spaces
- Accessible: Yes

History
- Opened: August 7, 2011; 15 years ago

Services
Preceding station	Utah Transit Authority	Following station
West Jordan City Center toward University Medical Center	Red Line	Jordan Valley toward Daybreak Parkway
Location

2700 West Sugar Factory Road station, sometimes referred to as simply 2700 West, is a light rail station in West Jordan, Utah, in the United States, served by the Red Line of the Utah Transit Authority's (UTA) TRAX light rail system. The Red Line provides service from the University of Utah to the Daybreak community of South Jordan.

== Description ==
The station is located at 8351 South 2700 West and is accessible from 2700 West at 8350 South (just north of West Sugar Factory Road). The station has a free Park and Ride lot with total of about 200 parking spaces available, but there are plans for more than 400 parking spaces. In the early planning stages the station was and is referred to as "2700 West Station", but later changed to the current name. Train schedules and maps often still refer to the station as simple "2700 West". Notwithstanding, the signage at the station (the Park and Ride and the passenger platform) indicates "8351 S. 2700 W." The station opened August 7, 2011, as part of the Red Line (Mid-Jordan) and is operated by the Utah Transit Authority.
