= 4800 West Old Bingham Highway station =

Light rail station in West Jordan, Utah, United States

4800 W. Old Bingham Highway
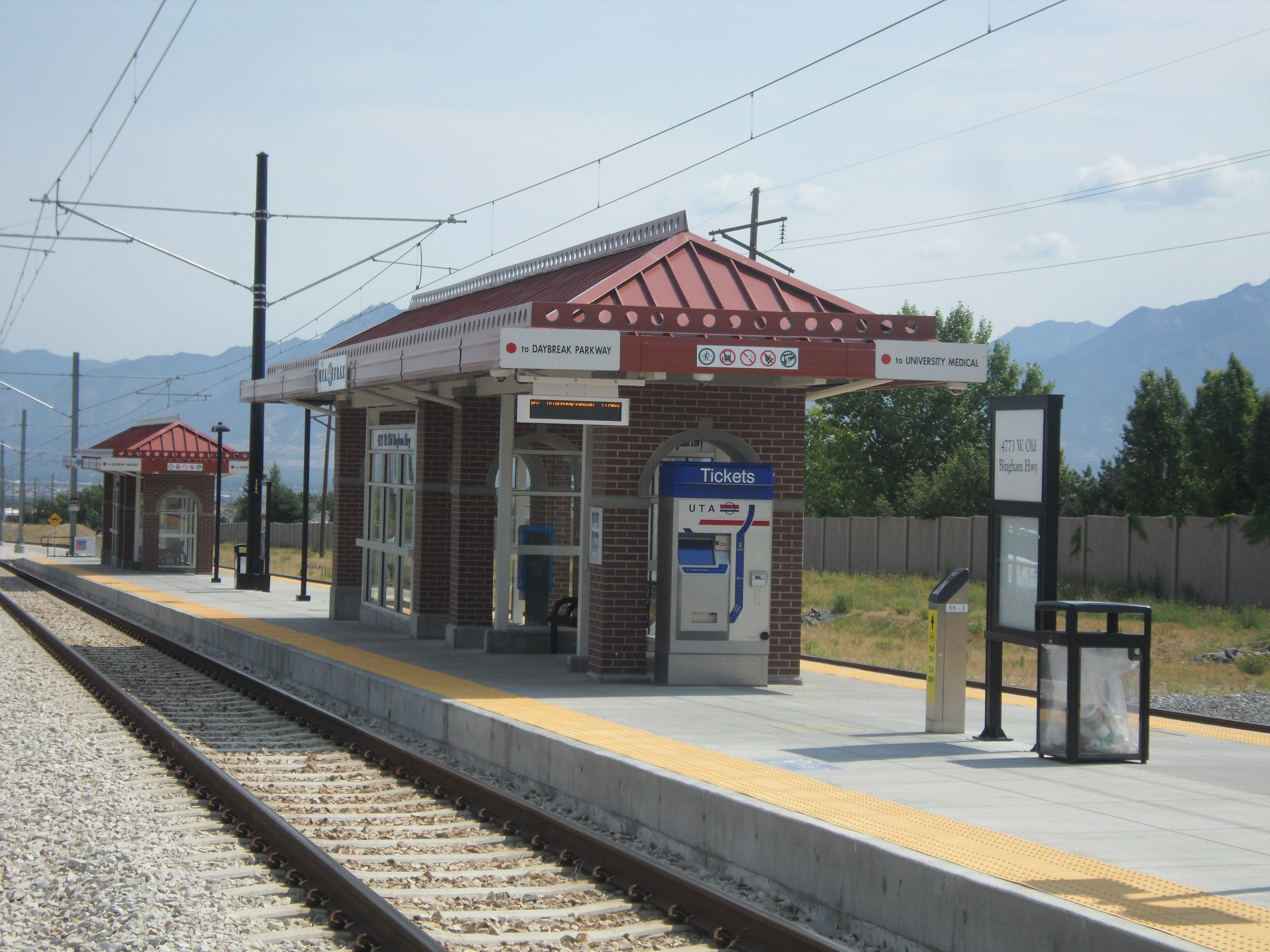
- 4800 West Old Bingham Highway station platform

General information
- Location: 4773 West Old Bingham Highway; West Jordan, Utah; United States
- Coordinates: 40°34′53″N 112°00′15″W
- Owner: Utah Transit Authority (UTA)
- Platforms: 1 island platform
- Tracks: 2
- Connections: UTA: 248

Construction
- Structure type: At-grade
- Parking: 244 spaces
- Accessible: Yes

History
- Opened: August 7, 2011; 15 years ago

Services
Preceding station	Utah Transit Authority	Following station
Jordan Valley toward University Medical Center	Red Line	5600 West Old Bingham Highway toward Daybreak Parkway
Location

4800 West Old Bingham Highway station is a light rail station in the Welby neighborhood of West Jordan, Utah, United States, served by the Red Line of the Utah Transit Authority's (UTA) TRAX light rail system. The Red Line provides service from the University of Utah to the Daybreak community of South Jordan.

== Description ==
The station is located at 4773 West Old Bingham Highway and is accessible from Old Bingham Highway. The station has a three free Park and Ride lots with total of 244 parking spaces available. Two of the Park and Ride lots are long and thin in order to fit entirely within the wide preexisting railroad right-of-way, so some spaces are quite far from the platform. These two lots run southwest and northeast away from the platform along the south side of Old Bingham Highway. The third lot in on the northeast corner of 4800 West and Old Bingham Highway and is accessible via 4800 West. This lot also includes the station's bus stops. It is in a low-density residential area, with a park a short distance south on 4800 West. In the early planning stages, the station was referred to as "4800 West Station", but later changed to the current name. Notwithstanding, the signage at the station (the Park and Ride and the passenger platform) indicates "4773 W. Old Bingham Hwy". The station opened August 7, 2011, as part of the Red Line (Mid-Jordan) and is operated by the Utah Transit Authority.
