= Fashion Place West station =

Light rail station in Murray, Utah, United States

Fashion Place West
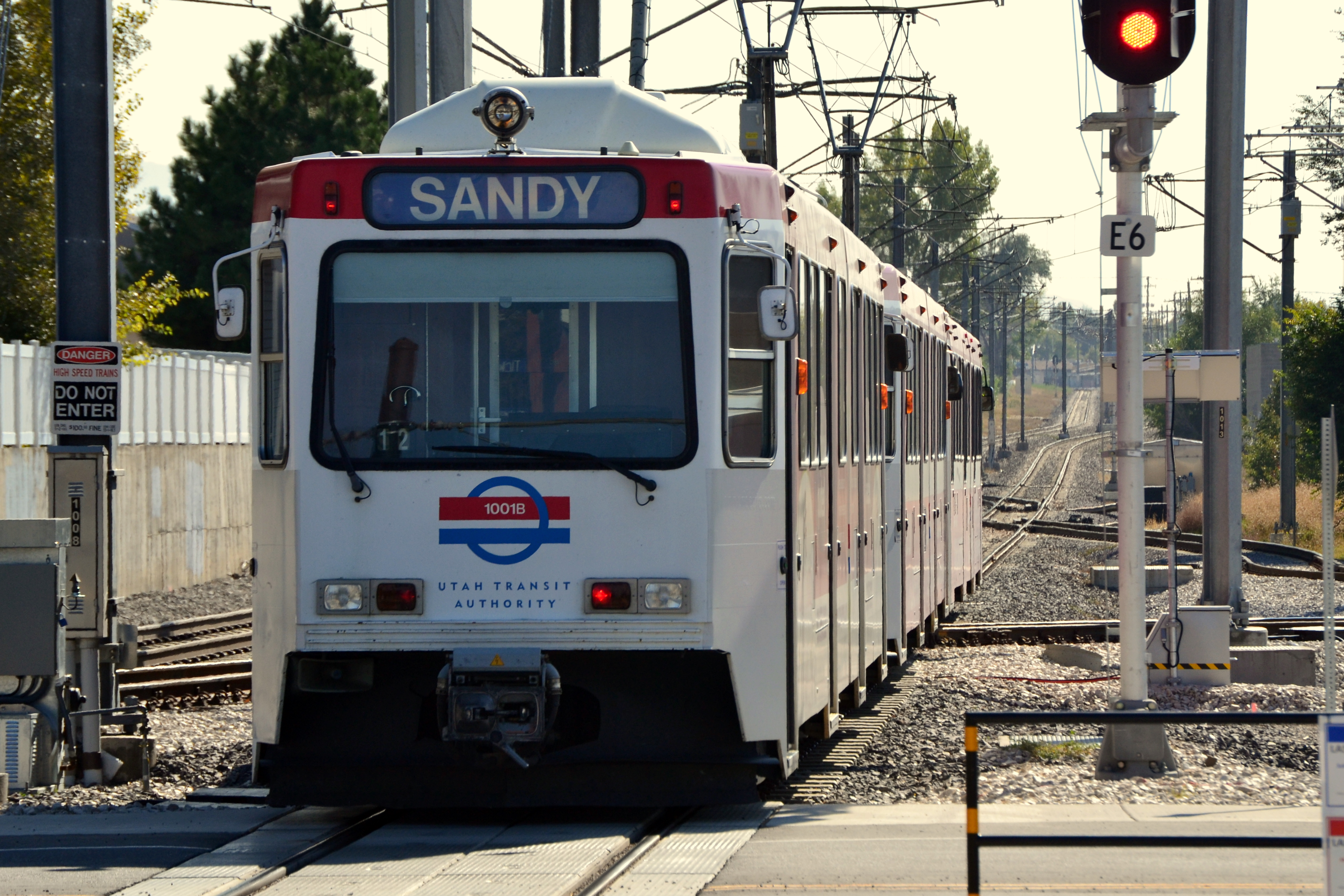
- A Blue Line train to Sandy departs Fashion Place West station

General information
- Location: 222 West Winchester Street; Murray, Utah; United States
- Coordinates: 40°38′00″N 111°53′53″W
- Owner: Utah Transit Authority (UTA)
- Platforms: 2 island platforms
- Tracks: 3
- Connections: UTA: 62, F202, 209

Construction
- Structure type: At-grade
- Parking: 100 spaces
- Accessible: Yes

History
- Opened: December 4, 1999; 26 years ago

Services
Preceding station	Utah Transit Authority	Following station
Murray Central toward Salt Lake Central	Blue Line	Midvale Fort Union toward Draper Town Center
Murray Central toward University Medical Center	Red Line	Bingham Junction toward Daybreak Parkway
Former services
Preceding station	Utah Transit Authority	Following station
Murray Central toward University Medical Center	Sandy/University Line	Midvale Fort Union toward Sandy Civic Center
Location

Fashion Place West station is a light rail station in Murray, Utah, United States, served by both the Blue Line and the Red Line of Utah Transit Authority's TRAX light rail system. The Blue Line provides service from Downtown Salt Lake City to Draper. The Red Line provides service from the University of Utah to the Daybreak community of South Jordan.

== Description ==
The station is located at 222 West Winchester Street (6400 South) and is accessible from that cross street. The station has two island platforms to accommodate three tracks: the easternmost track serves all northbound trains, the middle track serves southbound Blue Line trains, and the westernmost track serves southbound Red Line trains. Fashion Place West is named for its location a few blocks west of the Fashion Place Mall. When the station originally opened on December 4, 1999 the station had only one island platform, and was on a section of double track in the middle of a wye leading to Lovendahl yard. With the construction of the Red Line, the second (western) island platform was added. All northbound trains headed towards downtown stop on the east side of the eastern platform. Southbound Red Line trains stop on the west track, and southbound Blue Line trains stop at the center track. The station has two free Park and Ride lots, with one on both the east and west sides of the tracks, however, the UTA buses only connect in the eastern lot.

(Note: Recently UTA announced that beginning July 1, 2013, it will start a one year pilot program involving most of its TRAX and FrontRunner Park and Ride lots. The purpose of the new program is to make rider connections with the Salt Lake City International Airport more convenient by avoiding the need to park at the airport. The programs allows UTA patrons to park for an "unlimited amount of time" in the designated Park and Ride lots. In addition, UTA will allow free parking in all of its parking garages. Previous UTA policy limited parking to no more than 24 hours, except at its parking garages. As part of the year long pilot program, "UTA will measure parking lot usage and monitor costs, maintenance requirements, impacts to snow removal and security issues before determining if the program will be extended." There are eight Park and Ride lots that are excluded from this test program and the 24-hour time limit will still apply to these lots. Fashion Place West Station's lots are specifically not included in this test program. Notwithstanding permission to park for extended periods in the applicable Park and Ride Lots, updated signage at the stations advises that the UTA Transit Police request that they be notified anytime a car is parked in one of the lots for more than seven days.) The eastern lot is accessible from Winchester Street (6400 South), while the western lot is only accessible from Cottonwood Street (300 West. Between the two lots, there are 100 parking spaces available. The station is operated by Utah Transit Authority.

All of UTA's TRAX and FrontRunner trains and stations, as well as all fixed route buses, are compliant with Americans with Disabilities Act and are therefore accessible to those with disabilities. Signage at the stations, on the passenger platforms, and on the trains clearly indicate accessibility options. Ramps on the passenger platform and assistance from the train operator may be necessary for wheelchair boarding on Blue Line. These ramps are not used on the Red or Green line. In accordance with the Utah Clean Air Act and UTA ordinance, "smoking is prohibited on UTA vehicles as well as UTA bus stops, TRAX stations, and FrontRunner stations".

== Bus connections ==
Bus routes are current as of Change Day, December 11, 2022.

- UTA Route 62 – 6200 South: Murray – Taylorsville – Kearns/South Jordan, West Valley (via 6200 South)
- UTA Route 209 – 900 East: Murray, including Fashion Place mall – Millcreek – Sugar House, including the Sugarmont stop – Downtown Salt Lake City, The Avenues, including Red Line 900 East & 400 South and Salt Lake Central stations (via 900 East)

Although not accessible via the station's bus bay, riders who walk or ride east to State Street may board the Route 201 State Street bus.
