= Jordan Valley station =

Light rail station in West Jordan, Utah, United States

Jordan Valley
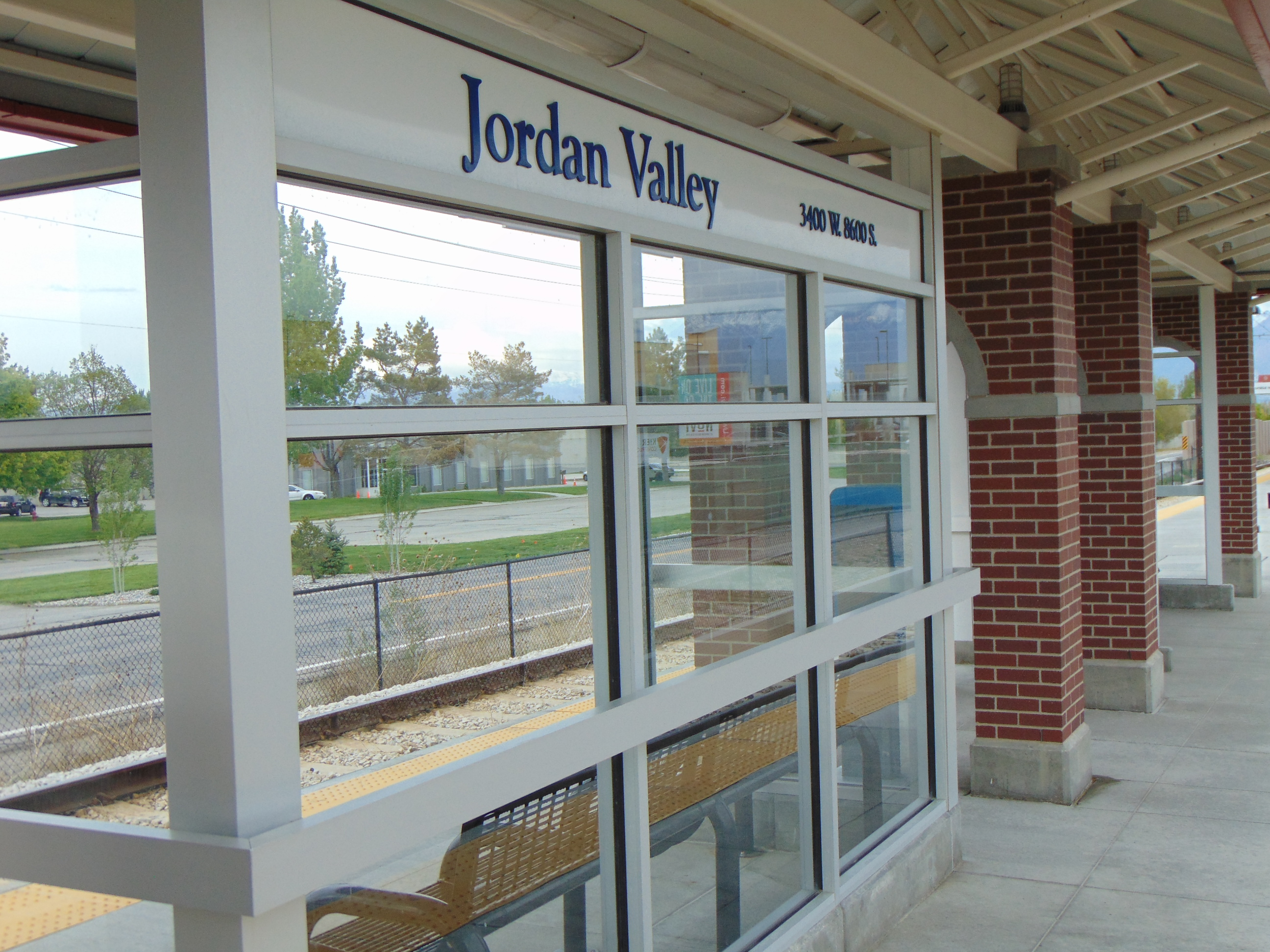
- Jordan Valley station platform

General information
- Location: 3400 West 8600 South; West Jordan, Utah; United States
- Coordinates: 40°35′41″N 111°58′19″W
- Owner: Utah Transit Authority (UTA)
- Platforms: 1 island platform
- Tracks: 2
- Connections: UTA: F232, 240, F590

Construction
- Structure type: At-grade
- Parking: 845 spaces
- Accessible: Yes

History
- Opened: August 7, 2011; 15 years ago

Services
Preceding station	Utah Transit Authority	Following station
2700 West Sugar Factory Road toward University Medical Center	Red Line	4800 West Old Bingham Highway toward Daybreak Parkway
Location

Jordan Valley station is a light rail station in West Jordan, Utah, United States, served by the Red Line of the Utah Transit Authority's (UTA) TRAX light rail system. The Red Line provides service from the University of Utah to the Daybreak community of South Jordan.

== Description ==
The station is located at 3400 West 8600 South but, although the station is situated immediately south of 8600 South, there is not direct vehicle access to the station's parking from that street, only by way of 3200 West. Also, while it is the closest TRAX station to Bangerter Highway (SR-154), there is no direct access to the station from Bangerter Highway either. The station can be reached from Bangerter Highway by heading east on 9000 South, then north on 3200 West, and finally west on 8660 South. The station is just northeast of the Jordan Valley Medical Center. In the early planning stages, the station was referred to as "Bangerter Station", but later changed to the current name. The station opened August 7, 2011, as part of the Red Line (Mid-Jordan) and is operated by the Utah Transit Authority.

Original plans for the station included a large Park and Ride lot with 577 free (UTA exclusive) parking spaces. However, two parking garages have been built at the station and provide 845 spaces. The fee for parking in either of the garage is $1 per day or $15 per month, however, payment is only required for parking from 6 am to 6 pm Monday through Friday, except holidays. Jordan Valley is the only TRAX station with a parking garage. Since their construction, the parking garages have had very little use; as low as 3 percent, according to UTA. The only other parking garage operated by UTA is located at the Draper FrontRunner Station and it has the same parking fees.
