= South Jordan Parkway station =

Light rail station in South Jordan, Utah, United States

South Jordan Parkway
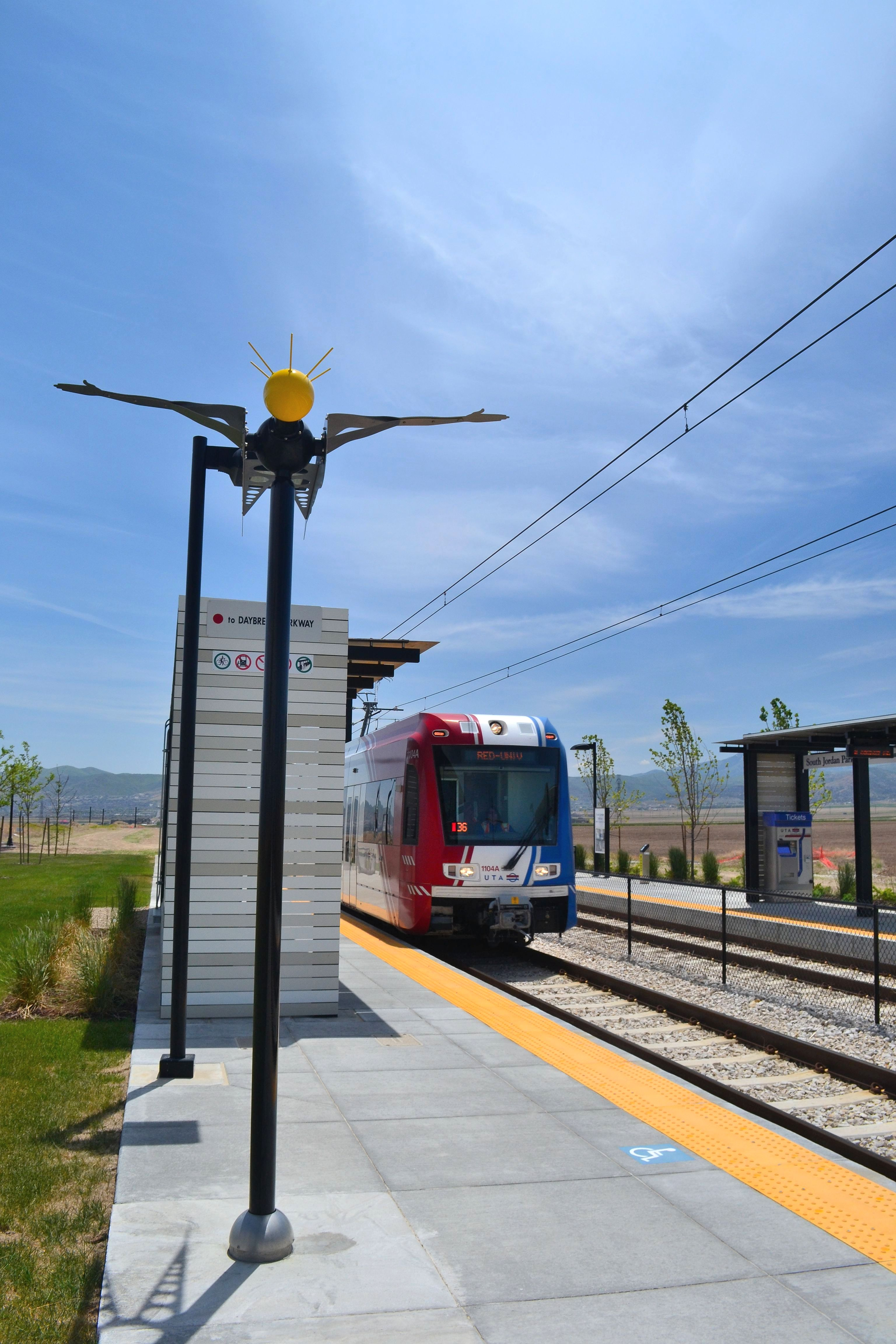
- South Jordan Parkway station platforms

General information
- Location: 10605 South Grandville Avenue; South Jordan, Utah; United States
- Coordinates: 40°33′31″N 112°01′29″W
- Owner: Utah Transit Authority (UTA)
- Platforms: 2 side platforms
- Tracks: 2
- Connections: UTA: On Demand South Valley

Construction
- Structure type: At-grade
- Parking: 200 spaces
- Accessible: Yes

History
- Opened: August 7, 2011; 15 years ago

Services
Preceding station	Utah Transit Authority	Following station
5600 West Old Bingham Highway toward University Medical Center	Red Line	South Jordan Downtown toward Daybreak Parkway
Location

South Jordan Parkway station is a light rail station in the Daybreak community in South Jordan, Utah, United States, served by the Red Line of the Utah Transit Authority's (UTA) TRAX light rail system. The Red Line provides service from the University of Utah to the Daybreak community.

== Description ==
The station is located at 10605 South Grandville Avenue (5600 West). Since its construction, the station has only been accessible from the southwest end of West South Jordan Parkway, but with continued construction of the Mountain View Corridor (SR-85), it will eventually be accessible via the Mountain View Corridor/West South Jordan Parkway interchange just to the southwest. When the station was constructed, there was almost nothing in its immediate vicinity. The station has a free Park and Ride lot with 200 parking spaces available, but there are plans for a total of about 400 parking spaces. In the early planning stages, the station was referred to as "Daybreak North Station", but later changed to the current name. The station is part of a railway right of way that was created specifically for the southwestern end of the Red Line. The station opened August 7, 2011, as part of the Red Line (Mid-Jordan) and is operated by the Utah Transit Authority.
