= Jordan Valley (disambiguation) =

The Jordan Valley is a valley following the Jordan River, forming the border between Jordan and Israel and the West Bank.

Jordan Valley may also refer to:

- Jordan Rift Valley, an elongated geographical depression located in modern-day Israel, Jordan, and Palestine, of which the Jordan Valley is a part
- Jordan Valley, Hong Kong, north of Ngau Tau Kok, Kwun Tong District
  - Jordan Valley (constituency), a constituency in Kwun Tong District
- Jordan Valley, Oregon, U.S.
- Jordan Valley (UTA station), a light rail station in West Jordan, Utah, U.S.

== See also ==
- Salt Lake Valley, which surrounds the Jordan River, Utah, United States
- Jordan River
