= South Jordan Downtown station =

Light rail station in South Jordan, Utah, United States

South Jordan Downtown
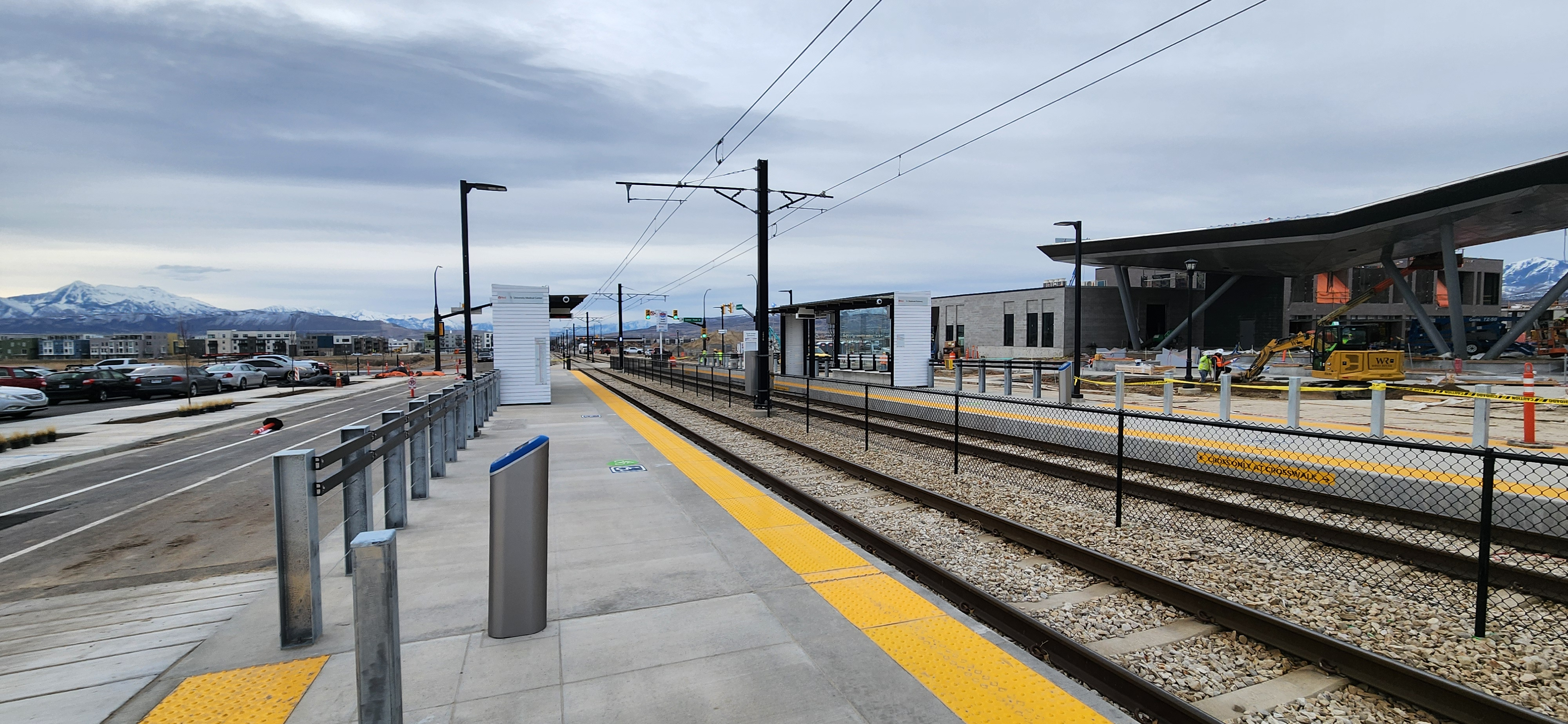
- South Jordan Downtown station, March 2025

General information
- Location: 11080 South Grandville Avenue; South Jordan, Utah; United States
- Coordinates: 40°32′59″N 112°01′10″W
- Owner: Utah Transit Authority (UTA)
- Platforms: 2 side platforms
- Tracks: 2
- Connections: UTA: On Demand South Valley

Construction
- Structure type: At-grade
- Accessible: Yes

History
- Opened: March 26, 2025

Services
Preceding station	Utah Transit Authority	Following station
South Jordan Parkway toward University Medical Center	Red Line	Daybreak Parkway Terminus
Location

South Jordan Downtown is a light rail station in the Daybreak community of South Jordan, Utah, served by the Red Line of the Utah Transit Authority's (UTA) TRAX light rail system. The station is the penultimate station southwestern end of the Red Line, which provides service from Daybreak Parkway station to the University of Utah.

== Description ==
South Jordan Downtown station is located at 11080 South Grandville Avenue, with both of the station's side platform situated in the median of that road. The station is also served by the UTA's On Demand South Valley microtransit system.

The infill station was added due to its proximity to The Ballpark at America First Square, a new baseball stadium, as well as general commercial and residential growth in the community. A station in the area had been planned for the 2030s, but was accelerated by the new development. Construction began on South Jordan Downtown station in summer 2024, and it opened on March 26, 2025.

While the station's official name is "South Jordan Downtown", it is also referred to as "Daybreak Central Station" in documents found on the Downtown Daybreak website.
