= Hires Big H =

Restaurant chain in Utah, USA

- Industry: Restaurant
- Area served: Sandy, Utah

Hires Big H is a restaurant chain headquartered in Sandy, Utah.

Hires Drive-In was founded in 1959 by Don Hale, a former grocer, with the assistance of his wife Shirley Hickman. In addition to the flagship branch located near the center of Salt Lake City, there are additional locations in Midvale and West Valley City.

Noted for honoring the tradition of the drive-in restaurants of the 1950s—both in its menu and interior decoration—the restaurants have achieved national recognition in publications like the American Automobile Association's Via magazine. Like many other Utah restaurants, it offers the regional condiment called fry sauce. Hires fry sauce can be found in grocery stores around the state.

The famous Hires Root Beer sold there was created in 1876 in Philadelphia by a pharmacist names Charles Elmer Hires. Though it is the original commercially sold root beer, it can now only be found ready made at the Hires Big H restaurants. Hires sold his beverage company in the 1960s. It was then sold three more time and the brand is currently owned by Dr. Pepper. Which also owns A&W root beer. Dr. Pepper phased out Hires root beer in the USA. Canada Dry sells a Hires Root Beer and Vodka drink in Canada

Don Hale died of natural causes at the age of 93 on Saturday, January 29, 2011, in Salt Lake City, Utah.
