= Red Line (TRAX) =

Light rail line in the Salt Lake Valley of Utah, United States

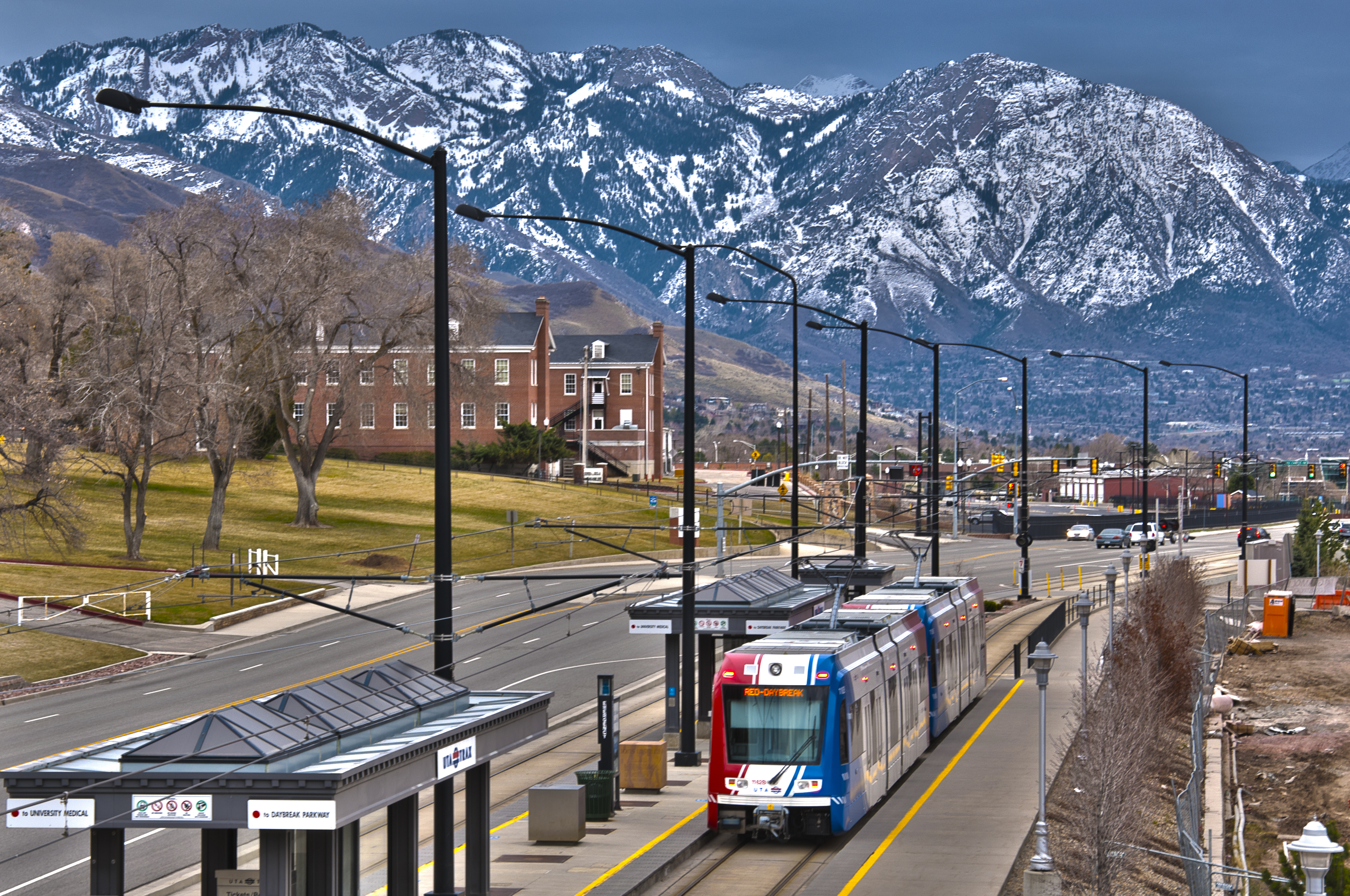
- Red Line train at Fort Douglas station headed for Daybreak

Overview
- Owner: Utah Transit Authority (UTA)
- Locale: Salt Lake Valley, Utah, U.S.
- Termini: University Medical Center; Daybreak Parkway
- Stations: 27

Service
- Type: Light rail
- System: TRAX
- Route number: 703
- Rolling stock: Siemens S70 US

History
- Opened: December 15, 2001; 24 years ago

Technical
- Number of tracks: 2
- Track gauge: 4 ft 8 1/2 in (1,435 mm) standard gauge
- Electrification: Overhead line, 750 V DC
- Operating speed: 65 mph (105 km/h) (max.)

The Red Line is a light rail line on the TRAX system in the Salt Lake Valley of Utah operated by the Utah Transit Authority (UTA). It originally began operation in December 2001 as the peak-hour-only Sandy/University Line, running from the University of Utah south to Sandy Civic Center on the Blue Line. It was later rerouted to South Jordan and renamed the Red Line in August 2011, running as an all-day route. The current line runs from the University of Utah Medical Center in Salt Lake City through the south end of Downtown Salt Lake City, South Salt Lake, Murray, Midvale, West Jordan, and South Jordan to the University of Utah's South Jordan Medical Center in Daybreak.

== History ==
The 703 route number was first used by the Sandy/University Line, also known as the Murray/Midvale/University Line, which opened on December 15, 2001, along with the University Line. The original line from the University to Sandy ran only twice a day during commute hours, while the University Line ran regularly. The southern end of the line was discontinued on May 1, 2011, leaving Fashion Place West in Murray as the new southern terminus; the line was briefly renamed the Murray–University Line to reflect the change. On August 7, 2011, UTA switched to a color-based naming system and the Sandy–University (Murray–University) Line became the Red Line, while the original SLC Intermodal-Sandy line became the Blue Line. That day also marked the opening of the Mid-Jordan extension, running from Fashion Place West through Midvale and West Jordan to the Daybreak development in South Jordan. Nine new stations and over 10 miles of track were constructed for the Daybreak extension at an estimated cost of $452 million.

== Route ==
The TRAX Red Line is designated as UTA Route 703.

=== Daybreak Parkway to Fashion Place West ===
The Red Line begins at Daybreak Parkway, which is adjacent to the University of Utah's South Jordan Medical Center, located in the middle of South Grandville Avenue, north of West Daybreak Parkway and east of the new Mountain View Corridor (SR-85) at about 5200 West and 11400 South in the Daybreak Community of South Jordan. It heads northwest, remaining in the middle of South Grandville Avenue, until it reaches about 5600 West and 10900 South, at which point South Grandville Avenue (now South 5200 West) heads north. Shortly thereafter, it reaches the next station, South Jordan Parkway. Continuing north, it crosses over Bingham Creek and then leaves the Daybreak Community and South Jordan and enters West Jordan just before reaching the next station 5600 West Old Bingham Highway. It then heads northwest just south of and paralleling West Old Bingham Highway. After crossing South 5200 West and South 4800 West, it immediately reaches the next station, 4800 West Old Bingham Highway. Continuing northeast and still paralleling West Old Bingham Highway, it crosses Wasatch Meadows Drive (South 4490 West), West 9000 South (with the Provo Reservoir Canal running under this crossing), and South 4000 West.

After crossing over Bangerter Highway (SR-154), it continues on its northeastern course. Just after West Old Bingham Highway heads directly north the Red Line reaches Jordan Valley. Briefly before and after Jordan Valley the parallel roadway on the north side is West 8600 South (which runs from West Old Bingham Highway to South 3200 West). After crossing South 3200 West, the Red Line no longer follows a roadway right-of-way, but maintains its northeastern course. After crossing the Utah and Salt Lake Canal Trail, it crosses South 2700 West and reaches the next station 2700 West Sugar Factory Road. Maintaining its northeastern course, the Red Line runs north of, but parallel to, Sugar Factory Road (West 8250 South) as it crosses over the South Jordan Canal and then immediately crosses South 2200 West. Thereafter, it continues northeast, while Sugar Factory Road heads due east. After crossing South Redwood Road (South 1700 West/SR-68), it reaches West Jordan City Center. Briefly before and after West Jordan City Center the parallel roadway on the south side is West 8045 South (which runs from South 1650 West to South 1500 West). The West Jordan City Hall, 3rd District Courthouse, West Jordan court building, and Jordan School District office building are northwest and north of this station.

From South 1500 West, the Red Line maintains its northeastern course as it crosses South 1300 West and then passes south of the West Jordan City Cemetery before reaching Historic Gardner. This station is located just south of Gardner Village. From the Historic Gardner, it heads north crossing over the North Jordan Canal and then over West 7800 South. It then briefly runs along the west side of, but parallel to, the Jordan River Parkway (and trail) and the Jordan River. It then heads east and crosses over the Jordan River (leaving West Jordan and entering Midvale) before crossing Bingham Junction Boulevard and reaching Bingham Junction. It then crosses over South 700 West before turning north and crossing West 7300 South. Continuing north it crosses over West 7200 South and then crosses West 6960 South before passing by the west side of the UTA's Lovendahl Rail Service Center and heading northeast under the southbound on ramp from I-215 to I-15 and then I-15 itself (leaving Midvale and entering Murray). The Red Line then crosses under the Union Pacific and FrontRunner tracks and under the I-15 northbound off ramps to I-215. (In railway terminology the Red Line's crossing under the Union Pacific and FrontRunner tracks is referred to as a flying junction.) It then crosses Cottonwood Street (South 367 West) before heading north at the junction with the TRAX Blue Line. The previous station for the Blue Line is Midvale Fort Union, having started in Draper. Just after the junction the two lines cross Winchester Drive and immediately reach Fashion Place West.

=== FrontRunner Connection ===
From Fashion Place West, the Blue and Red lines continue north on the east side of South 300 West (Cottonwood Street) as they cross over I-215 and then cross West 6100 South and West 5900 South. Just prior to crossing over West 5400 South (SR-173/Spartan Street), the lines curve slightly to the east as they cross under Cottonwood Street (which curves more sharply to the east). At about 5150 South, the lines reach Murray Central. This station is located just west of the Intermountain Medical Center. It is one of only three TRAX stations with connection with FrontRunner and one of two served by the Blue Line. (The FrontRunner provides commuter rail service between Ogden in Weber County through Davis County and Salt Lake County to Provo in central Utah County.)

=== Murray Central to Central Pointe ===
Heading north and slightly to the east from Murray Central, the Blue and Red lines cross West Vine Street (West 5090 South) and over Little Cottonwood Creek before continuing directly north as they cross West 4800 South and the 4500 South Frontage Road. After crossing over West 4500 South (SR-266) the lines reach Murray North at about 4300 South. After crossing West Fireclay Avenue the lines curve slightly to the west as they continue north and cross over Big Cottonwood Creek. Upon crossing over Big Cottonwood Creek, the lines also leave Murray and briefly enter unincorporated Salt Lake County. Continuing north and slightly to the west, the lines cross West Central Avenue and then West 3900 South. At West 3900 South the lines leave unincorporated Salt Lake County and enter South Salt Lake. Immediately north of West 3900 South is Meadowbrook. From this station the lines head directly north until they cross West 3300 South (SR-171) and immediately reach Millcreek. Continuing north from Millcreek the lines cross West Gregson Avenue, West 2950 South, and West 2700 South, before crossing under I-80.

From I-80 the lines continue north and cross West Haven Avenue before the junction with the TRAX Green Line. The previous station for the Green Line is River Trail, having originated in West Valley City. Just after the junction all three lines head north and reach Central Pointe, which is just south of West 2100 South (SR-201). Central Pointe is the only TRAX station served by the S Line. The S Line platform is situated just southeast of the TRAX platform. (The S Line provides streetcar service east to the Fairmont stop in the Sugar House neighborhood of Salt Lake City.)

=== Central Pointe to Courthouse ===
Upon crossing West 2100 South the three TRAX lines leave South Salt Lake and enter Salt Lake City and continue north as they cross West 1700 South and West 1300 South. Just north of West 1300 South is Ballpark, which provides service to Smith's Ballpark. (Immediately north of this station is a non-revenue track that extends northwest to South 400 West at West 900 South and then north to West 600 South.) After Ballpark the three lines continue north in the center median of South 200 West, crossing under the 900 South/I-15 on and off ramps, until they reach the next station, 900 South. This station, which is just north of West 900 South, is an infill station and the last stop before the TRAX lines reach Downtown Salt Lake City.

The three lines continue north in the median of South 200 West, crossing West 800 South, until they reach West 700 South. At West 700 South they turn east and proceed down the middle of that street for two blocks, crossing South West Temple Street (SR-270). At South Main Street, the lines turn north and continue down the center median of that street and cross West 600 South (Martin Luther King Jr Boulevard/SR-269 eastbound), pass between the Grand America Hotel and the Little America Hotel, and then cross West 500 South (Cesar E Chavez Boulevard/SR-269 westbound). Just north of West 500 South and slightly west of the Scott Matheson Courthouse, is the first station within the Free Fare Zone, Courthouse. At West 400 South (University Boulevard/US Highway 89) the Red Line turns east while the Green and Blue lines continue north to Gallivan Plaza, with the Blue Line ending at Salt Lake Central in Downtown Salt Lake City and the Green Line ending at Airport at the Salt Lake City International Airport.

=== Courthouse to University Medical Center ===
After turning east onto East 400 South, the Red Line continues down the middle of that street, passing the Frank E. Moss United States Courthouse on the south before crossing State Street (US Highway 89). After passing the Salt Lake City and County Building on the south it crosses South 200 East and reaches Library, which is just north of the Salt Lake City Public Library. Library is the last station on the Red Line that is within the Free Fare Zone. Continuing in the median of East 400 South, it crosses South 300 East, South 400 East, South 500 East, and South 600 East before reaching Trolley located between the 4th South Market and Family Center shopping centers but named for the Trolley Square mall located two blocks away. After crossing South 700 East and South 800 East, but just before crossing South 900 East is the next station, 900 East. Continuing in the median of the street, the Red Line heads east, but does a jog to the south as East University Boulevard heads south at 1000 East and then east again at 500 South. (This jog to the south is also where the Red Line ascends the east bench.) Continuing east in the median of East 500 South, it crosses South 1100 East and South 1300 East before reaching the University of Utah campus.

The Red Line then turns north to briefly run along the east side of University Street. Just after turning north, it reaches Stadium, which is just west of the Rice-Eccles Stadium. It then turns east at South Campus Drive (East 400 South) and briefly runs along the south side of that street. As South Campus Drive does a slight jog to the north (around the north end of the Rice-Eccles Stadium), the Red Line shifts from the south side of the street to the median. After passing the stadium and crossing South 1500 East, it heads southeast, crossing through the roundabout at the north end of Campus Center Drive (South 1580 East). Remaining in the median of the street, it then passes the Utah Museum of Fine Arts on the north and crosses South 1725 East (Campus Center Drive/Research Road) and heads northeast until it reaches University South Campus, which is just west of South 1800 East.

After crossing South 1800 East, the Red Line continues northeast in the median of South Campus Drive until it reaches the end of that road at Mario Capecchi Drive (formerly called Wasatch Drive). It then turns north and follows along the west side of Mario Capecchi Drive (South 1900 East, formerly Medical Center Drive) until it reaches Fort Douglas at about 200 South. After Fort Douglas, it continues along the west side of Mario Capecchi Drive as it ascends a bit more and briefly heads northeast and then northwest. At about 10 North 1900 East is the last station on the Red Line, University Medical Center. It is immediately south of Primary Children's Medical Center and southeast of the multiple buildings on the campus of University of Utah Medical Center.

=== Park and Ride ===
Many TRAX stations include free Park and Ride lots, with some lots having as few as six parking spaces and others having nearly 1200. However, there are certain restrictions for all lots (for example, no 24-hour parking). The only parking for which UTA charges is the parking garages at the Jordan Valley station in West Jordan (which is on the Red Line) and the Draper FrontRunner station. The cost is $1 per day or $15 per month, however, payment is only required for parking from 6 am to 6 pm Monday through Friday, except holidays.

=== Free Fare Zone ===
UTA currently has a Free Fare Zone in Downtown Salt Lake City for transportation patrons that both enter and exit bus or TRAX service within the Zone. The Zone covers an area of approximately thirty-six city blocks and the boundaries are roughly North Temple, 200 East, 500 South, and 400 West. TRAX stations within the Zone include Arena, City Center, Courthouse, Gallivan Plaza (mistakenly identified as "Gallivan Center Station" on the Free Fare Zone map), Planetarium, and Temple Square. In addition, the Free Fare Zone also includes the area of the State Capitol (north to 500 North), the bus stops on 400 South between 200 East and 300 East, and three additional TRAX stations: Library, Old GreekTown, and Salt Lake Central. In June 2012 UTA revealed plans to eliminate the Free Fare Zone, but by September 2012 it announced that it would continue the Zone, but with some minor adjustments, including when and how fares are collected.

== Train schedule ==
As of December 2023

On weekdays and Saturdays, the first northbound Red Line trains to the University Medical Center Station leave the Central Pointe Station at 4:58 AM and the Daybreak Parkway Station at 4:45 AM. The first southbound trains to the Daybreak Parkway Station leave the Central Pointe Station at 4:56 AM and the University Medical Center Station at 5:30 AM. The last southbound train leaves the University Medical Center Station at 11:30 PM and the last northbound train leaves the Daybreak Parkway Station at 11:24 PM. However, the last trains only go as far as the Central Pointe Station. The last southbound train to the Daybreak Parkway Station leaves the University Medical Center Station at 10:45 PM and the last northbound train to the University Medical Center Station leaves the Daybreak Parkway Center Station at 10:24 PM.

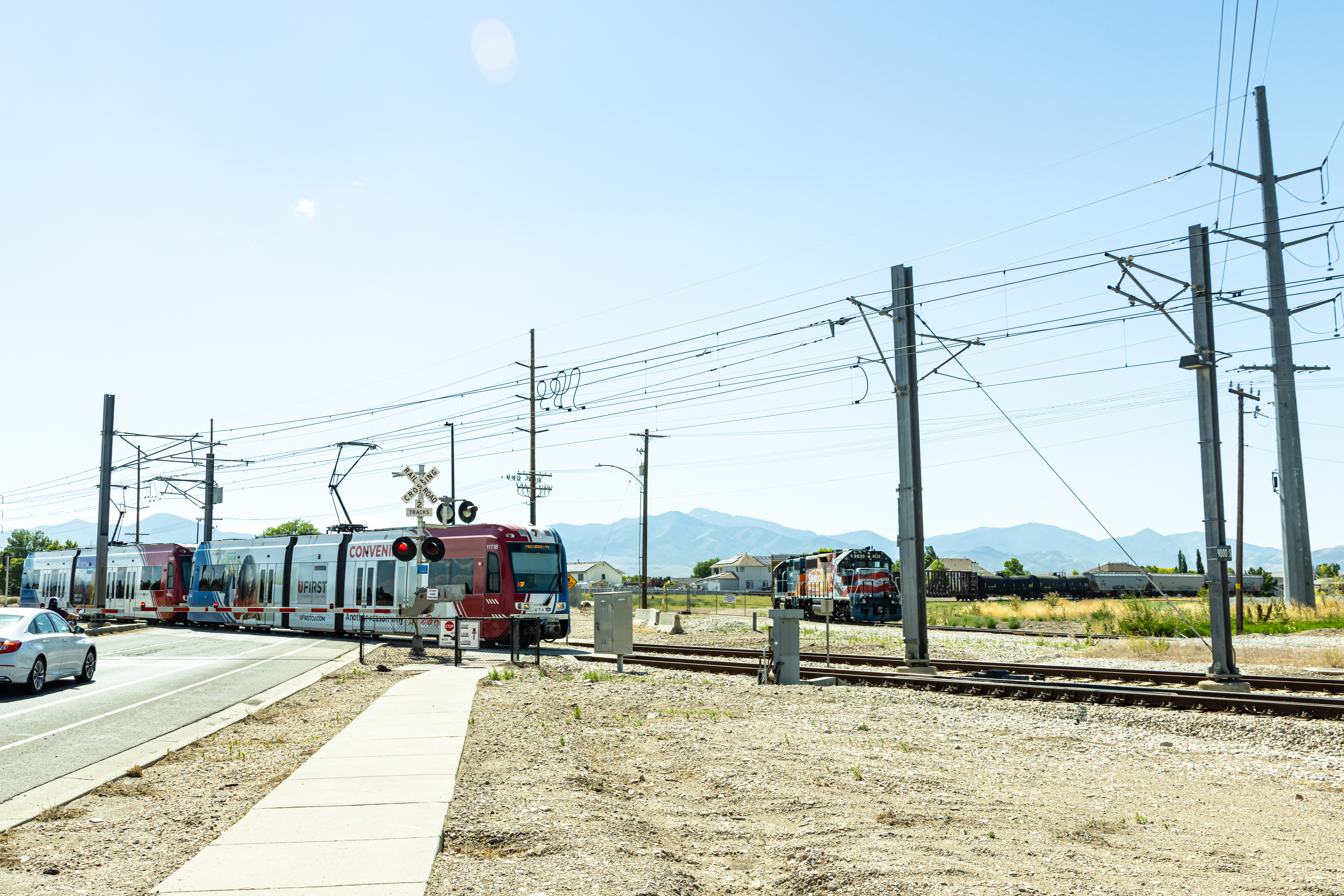
Freight Trains will use the Red Line starting at Bingham Junction going west after service ends. Pictured here is a Savage Bingham and Garfield tied on the Garfield Branch cause it ran out of time before service resumed on the Red Line

On Sundays, the first northbound Red Line trains to the University Medical Center Station leave the Central Pointe Station at 5:22 AM and the Daybreak Parkway Station at 5:49 AM. The first southbound trains to the Daybreak Parkway Station leave the Central Pointe Station at 5:03 AM and the University Medical Center Station at 6:08 AM. The last southbound train leaves the University Medical Center Station at 11:08 PM and the last northbound train leaves the Daybreak Parkway Station at 10:49 PM. However, the last trains only go as far as the Central Pointe Station. The last southbound train to the Daybreak Parkway Station leaves the University Medical Center Station at 10:38 PM and the last northbound train to the University Medical Center Station leaves the Daybreak Parkway Center Station at 9:49 PM.

Red Line trains run every fifteen minutes on weekdays and Saturday and every thirty minutes on Sundays.

== Stations ==
The following table lists the current stations of the Red Line, from north to south.

Key
Ø	Free Fare Zone

Station Name	Municipality	Date opened	Major connections and notes
University Medical Center	Salt Lake City	September 29, 2003	Serves University of Utah Hospital
Fort Douglas	Salt Lake City	September 29, 2003	Serves Fort Douglas and University of Utah
University South Campus	Salt Lake City	September 29, 2003	Serves University of Utah
Stadium	Salt Lake City	December 15, 2001	Serves Rice–Eccles Stadium
900 East	Salt Lake City	December 15, 2001	Serves Salt Lake Regional Medical Center
Trolley	Salt Lake City	December 15, 2001	Serves Trolley Square
Library Ø	Salt Lake City	December 15, 2001	Serves Salt Lake City Public Library and City and County Building
Courthouse Ø	Salt Lake City	December 4, 1999	Blue Line; Green Line; Serves the Federal Courthouse and Third District Courthouse
600 South	Salt Lake City	July 26, 2022	Blue Line; Green Line
900 South	Salt Lake City	May 19, 2005	Blue Line; Green Line
Ballpark	Salt Lake City	December 4, 1999	Blue Line; Green Line; Serves Smith's Ballpark; Park and ride: 170 spaces
Central Pointe	South Salt Lake	December 4, 1999	Blue Line; Green Line; S Line; Park and ride: 57 spaces
Millcreek	South Salt Lake	December 4, 1999	Blue Line; Park and ride: 101 spaces
Meadowbrook	South Salt Lake	December 4, 1999	Blue Line; Park and ride: 497 spaces
Murray North	Murray	December 4, 1999	Blue Line; Park and ride: 235 spaces
Murray Central	Murray	December 4, 1999	Blue Line; FrontRunner Midvalley Express; Serves the Intermountain Medical Center; Park and ride: 750 spaces
Fashion Place West	Murray	December 4, 1999	Blue Line; Park and ride: 100 spaces
Bingham Junction	Midvale	August 7, 2011	Park and ride: 200 spaces
Historic Gardner	West Jordan	August 7, 2011	Park and ride: 130 spaces
West Jordan City Center	West Jordan	August 7, 2011	Serves West Jordan City Center; Park and ride: 221 spaces
2700 W Sugar Factory Rd	West Jordan	August 7, 2011	Park and ride: 204 spaces
Jordan Valley	West Jordan	August 7, 2011	Serves Jordan Valley Hospital and SLCC Jordan Campus; Park and ride: 845 spaces
4800 W Old Bingham Hwy	West Jordan	August 7, 2011	Park and ride: 244 spaces
5600 W Old Bingham Hwy	South Jordan	August 7, 2011	Park and ride: 420 spaces
South Jordan Parkway	South Jordan	August 7, 2011	Park and ride: 200 spaces
South Jordan Downtown	South Jordan	March 26, 2025	Infill station
Daybreak Parkway	South Jordan	August 7, 2011	Park and ride: 400 spaces

== Proposed realignment ==
In 2023, UTA published its Light Rail Strategic Plan, which highlighted plans by the agency to build new tracks along both 400 South and 400 West in Downtown Salt Lake City, connecting to the existing TRAX network at Ballpark to the south, Courthouse to the east, and either Salt Lake Central or Planetarium to the west. This expansion is also planned to include new stations at Pioneer Park and within the Granery District. Once completed, this infrastructure is planned to allow for:

- Creation of a new Orange Line service between Salt Lake City International Airport and the University of Utah via Pioneer Park.
- A re-routing of the existing Red Line between Ballpark and Courthouse stations through the Granery District.
- Swapping the northern termini of the Blue and Green Lines, such that the Blue Line runs from Draper to the Airport, and the Green Line from West Valley Central to Salt Lake Central.

Additionally, the Strategic Plan highlights expansion of the TRAX network to the University of Utah Research Park, splitting off from the current system at University South Campus station. This new service would be provided by the proposed Orange Line. UTA proposes that these expansions be completed prior to Salt Lake City's hosting of the 2034 Winter Olympics.

== See also ==
- List of rapid transit systems
- Transportation in Salt Lake City
- TRAX (light rail)
- TRAX Blue Line
- TRAX Green Line
- FrontRunner
- Utah Transit Authority bus rapid transit
- S Line (formerly known as Sugar House Streetcar)
