= Kennecott Land =

- Defunct: 2001
- Headquarters: South Jordan, Utah, US
- Owner: Rio Tinto

Kennecott Land, a subsidiary of Rio Tinto Group, is an American land development company formed in 2001 and based in South Jordan, Utah, in the United States. Kennecott Land owns 93,000 acres (380 km²) of undeveloped land in Salt Lake and Tooele counties in Utah, 75,000 acres (300 km²) of which are located in Salt Lake County. The company was formed by Rio Tinto in order to utilize land formerly owned by mining companies like Kennecott Utah Copper. The first major development, the Daybreak Community, has begun construction in the western half of the city of South Jordan.
