= Daybreak (community) =

Planned community near Salt Lake City, Utah, United States

Coordinates: 40.546842°N 111.99965°W

Daybreak is a master-planned community in South Jordan, Utah, on land formerly part of Bingham Canyon Mine. Daybreak was originally owned by Kennecott Land. As of 2024, it was being developed by the Larry H. Miller Company (LHMC).

== Description and history ==
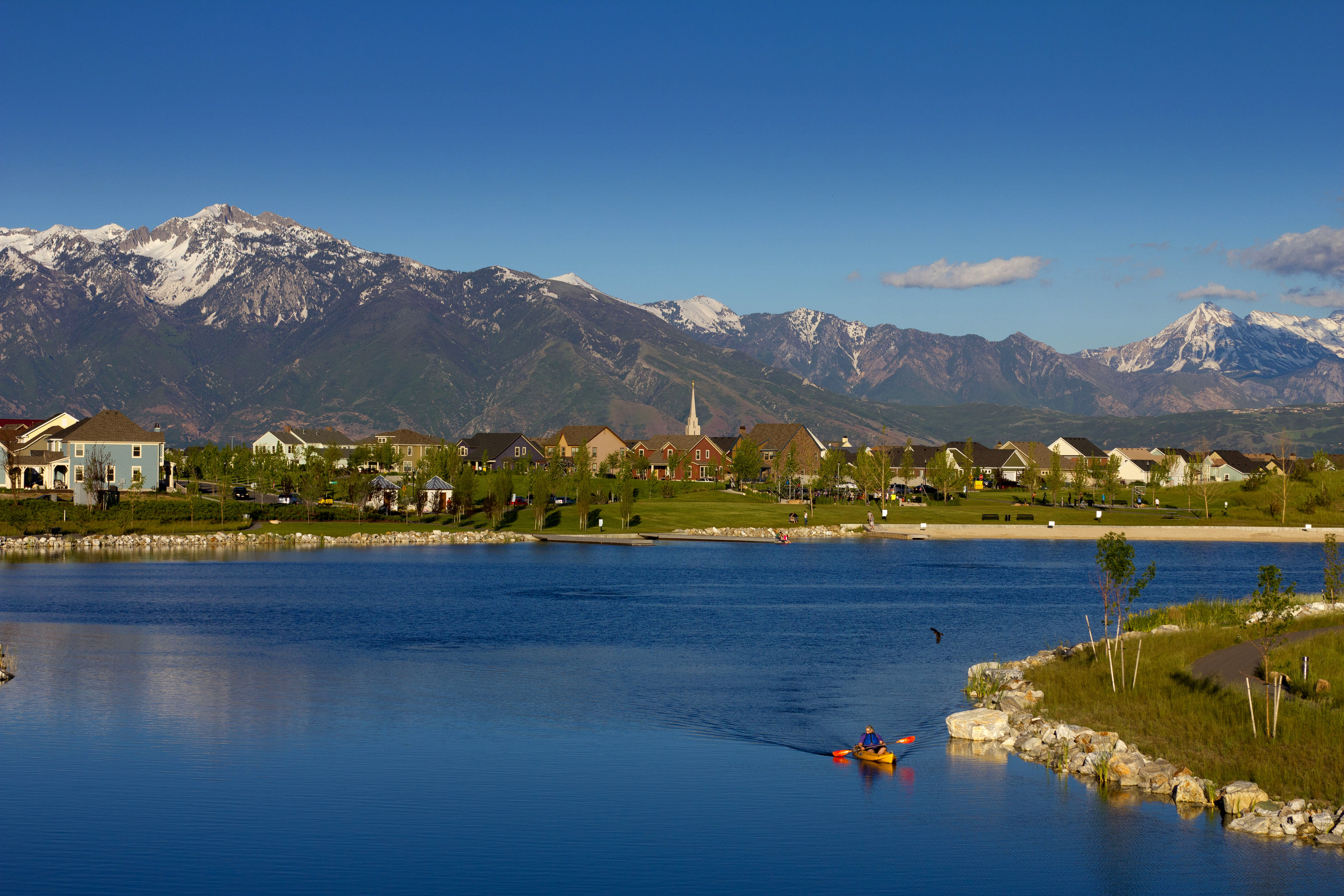
Daybreak Community located in South Jordan, UT.

Daybreak was originally part of the Bingham Canyon Mine, where copper, gold, silver, and other minerals were extracted. Kennecott Land carried out an accelerated clean-up of the former mine and its surroundings. The Environmental Protection Agency praised the project and has since given the land a clean bill of health.

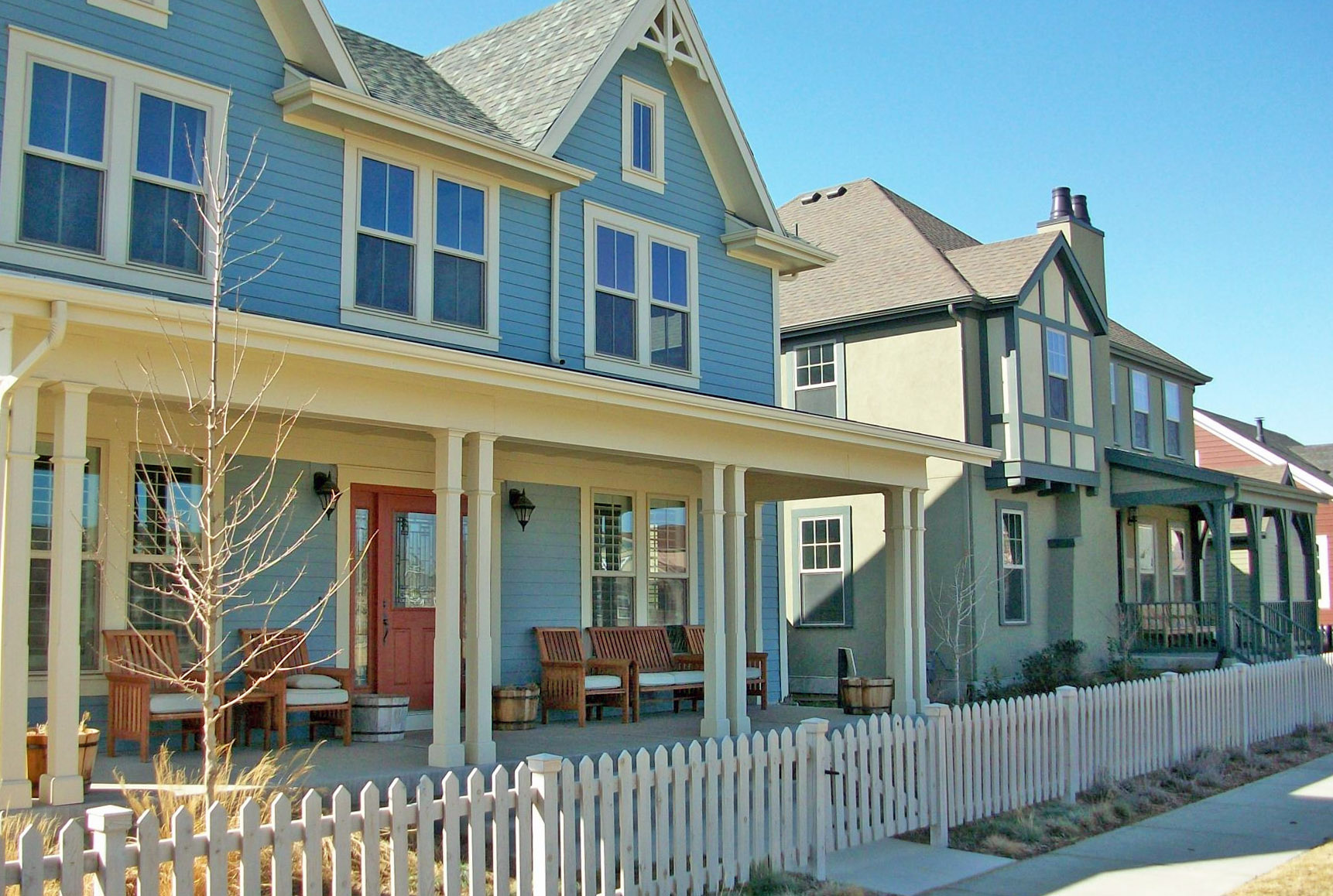

In 2021, the undeveloped portion of the community, then comprising 1,300 acres, was sold to Larry H. Miller Real Estate. It is anticipated that expansion of the community will progress over about 20 years. Once completed, the Daybreak community could encompass over 20,000 residential units and approximately 9.1 million square feet (850,000 m²) of commercial space.

Daybreak's master planners included Peter Calthorpe of Berkeley, California; Ken Kay Associates of San Francisco, California; Loci of Salt Lake City, Utah; and Urban Design Associates of Pittsburgh, Pennsylvania. It was constructed on New Urbanist principles. Daybreak was designed to encourage walking. This was accomplished through high density, small yards, extensive trail systems, and the intentional clustering of homes around retail centers.

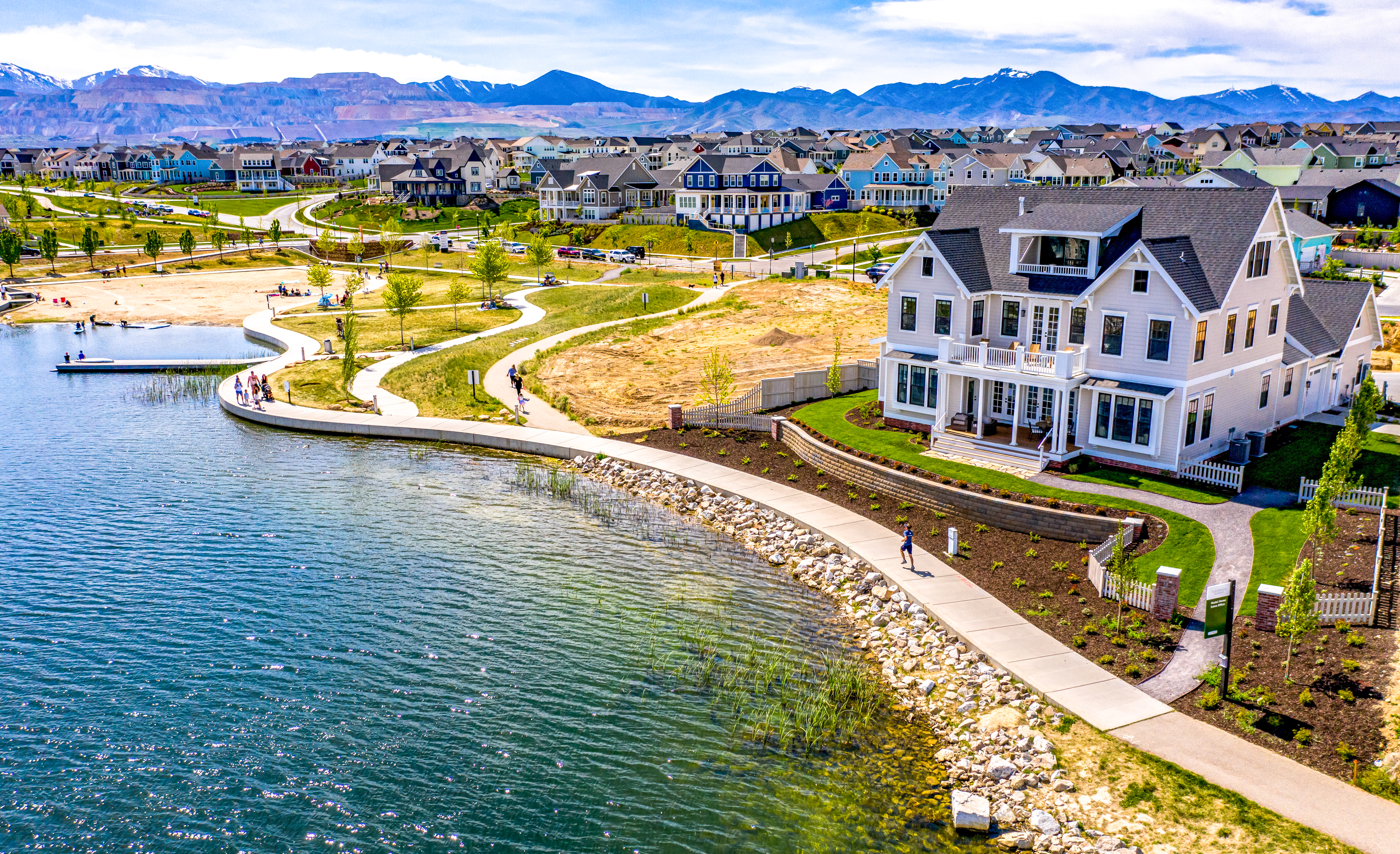
Example of homes in Daybreak

In October 2021, IHP Capital Partners and Fieldstone Homes announced a project to develop dozens of houses in Daybreak.

According to Zonda, a market-research tool for housing, one in six houses built in Salt Lake County in 2022 were located in Daybreak. South Jordan's population grew from 50,148 in 2010 to 80,139 people by the end of 2022.

All homes in the community are Energy Star certified. Daybreak was the first community of its size in the region to meet these standards. The entire community has been designed and built with sustainability in mind. Many of the home builders in the community offer options such as solar and thermal panels, renewable building materials, and energy efficient appliances.

Many homes in Daybreak have fiber-optic internet connections.

== Amenities ==
Daybreak was designed so that a park, a community center, a trail or school would always be within a five-minute walk. The community has a large lake, about 1,000 acres dedicated to green space, and a 50-mile trail system called The Loop.

Daybreak has a community center with a health club as well as seven swimming pools. There are also fenced dog parks and community gardens. Local grocer Harmons has also opened a location within the community, as well as the regional brand Smith's Food and Drug. Along with the 22 miles (35 km) of trails and 48 community parks, Oquirrh Lake was developed in 2005 for non-motorized boating, fishing, and other recreation. The Watercourse, a water feature on the west side of the community, was constructed starting in 2019 and fully opened in 2024.

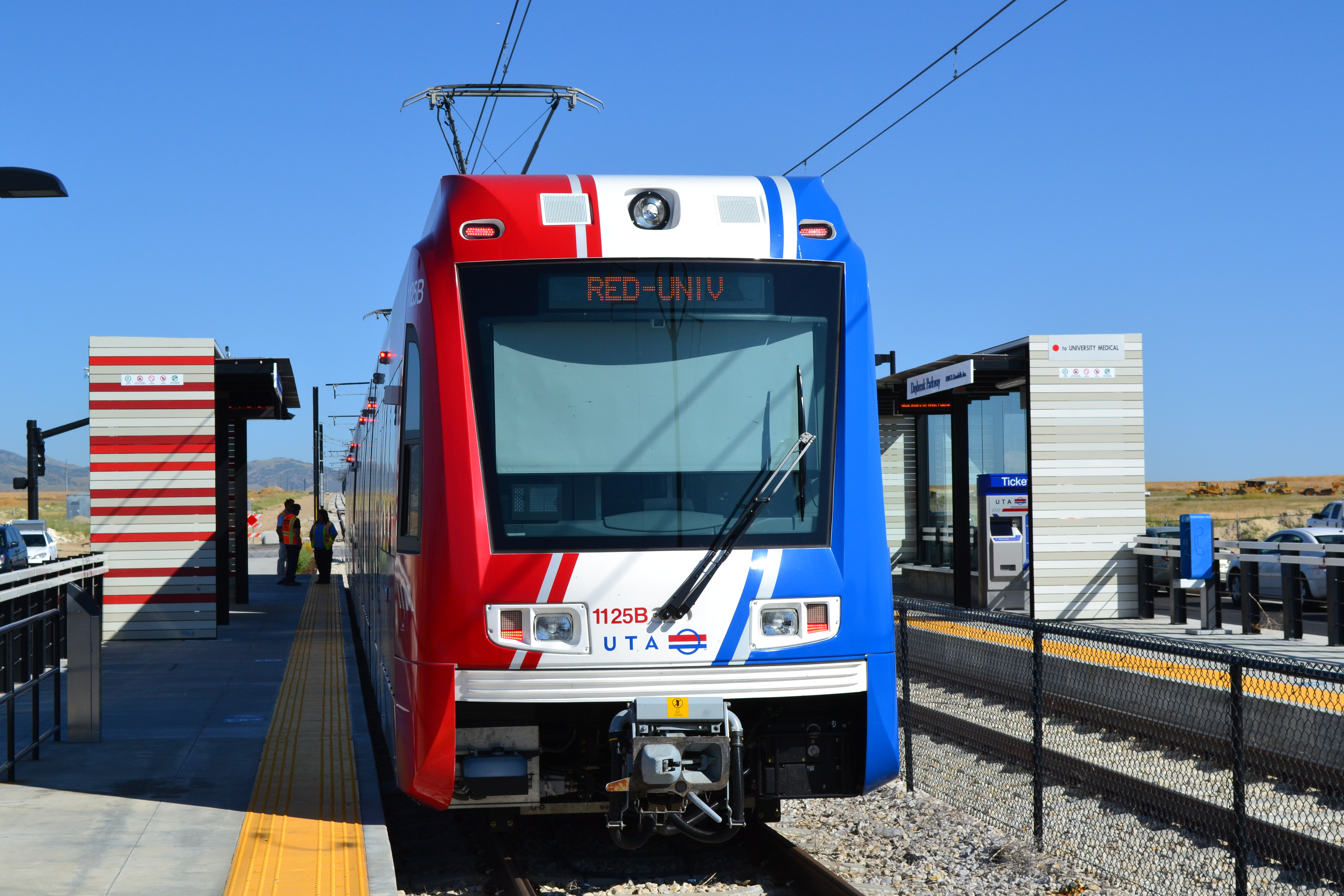
Red Line Trax at Daybreak Parkway

The Red Line of the Utah Transit Authority's light rail system (via the Daybreak Parkway station, South Jordan Downtown station, and South Jordan Parkway station) provides Daybreak residents and the southwest Salt Lake Valley access to downtown Salt Lake City and the University of Utah, as well as connections to the Salt Lake City International Airport and the FrontRunner regional rail line. The Mountain View Corridor also provides access to Daybreak, and Bangerter Highway lies along its eastern edge. Daybreak is also located adjacent to a shopping center known as The District, which contains 1,200,000 square feet (110,000 m^{2}) of retail space.

The LiveDaybreak Community Council holds an annual dragon boat race which is part of a broader Dragon Boat Festival celebration.

=== Downtown Daybreak ===
Downtown Daybreak is Utah's first dedicated sports and entertainment district. It includes a library, a University of Utah health center with an urgent care clinic and emergency room, a fire station, and a police station. The University of Utah owns an additional 90 acres of land in Daybreak which will be used for a new campus. In 2025, Hires Big H opened a restaurant in Downtown Daybreak.

In early 2023, the LHMC announced that it would build a stadium for the Salt Lake Bees, a Triple-A Minor League Baseball team, in Downtown Daybreak. It opened for the 2025 season and has a capacity of 8,000 people. The ballpark is served by the new South Jordan Downtown TRAX station.

The stadium is called The Ballpark at America First Square. America First Credit Union owns its naming rights. The stadium is part of a broader phase of expansion in Downtown Daybreak that includes Megaplex Theatres, other entertainment venues, and apartment buildings. Additional commercial development is anticipated on 200 designated acres. Construction of phase one of Downtown Daybreak started in early November 2023. In May 2023, Larry H. Miller Company released renderings of The Ballpark at America First Square. The stadium was designed by HOK and built by Okland Construction. The Ballpark is designed to meet the requirements of a Major League Baseball team. Its design includes a 12,000-square-foot clubhouse, training and player development areas, and multiple batting cages.

In early 2026, the local Catholic diocese announced construction of a $35-million basilica-style church in Daybreak.

In May 2026, Trader Joe's announced plans to build a location in Daybreak after filing for the relevant building permit.

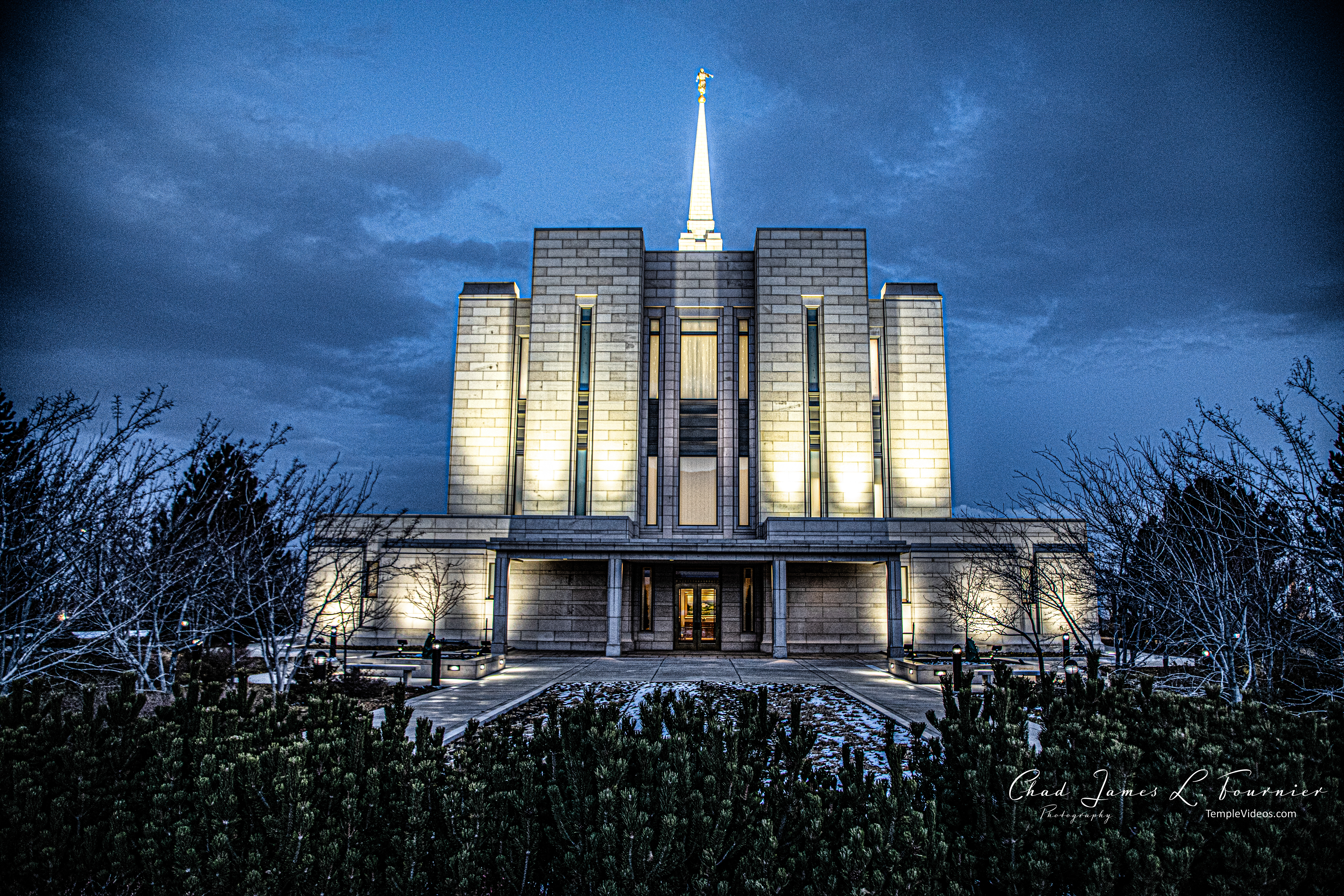
The Oquirrh Mountain Utah Temple was built on a bluff on the edge of the Daybreak Community.

== Governance ==
Daybreak is managed by the Daybreak Community Association.

The Utah state legislature gave South Jordan special tax powers and created a Housing and Transit Reinvestment Zone centered around Daybreak. Thousands of medium-density residences will be built in and around Daybreak.
