= Daybreak Parkway station =

Light rail station in South Jordan, Utah, United States

Daybreak Parkway
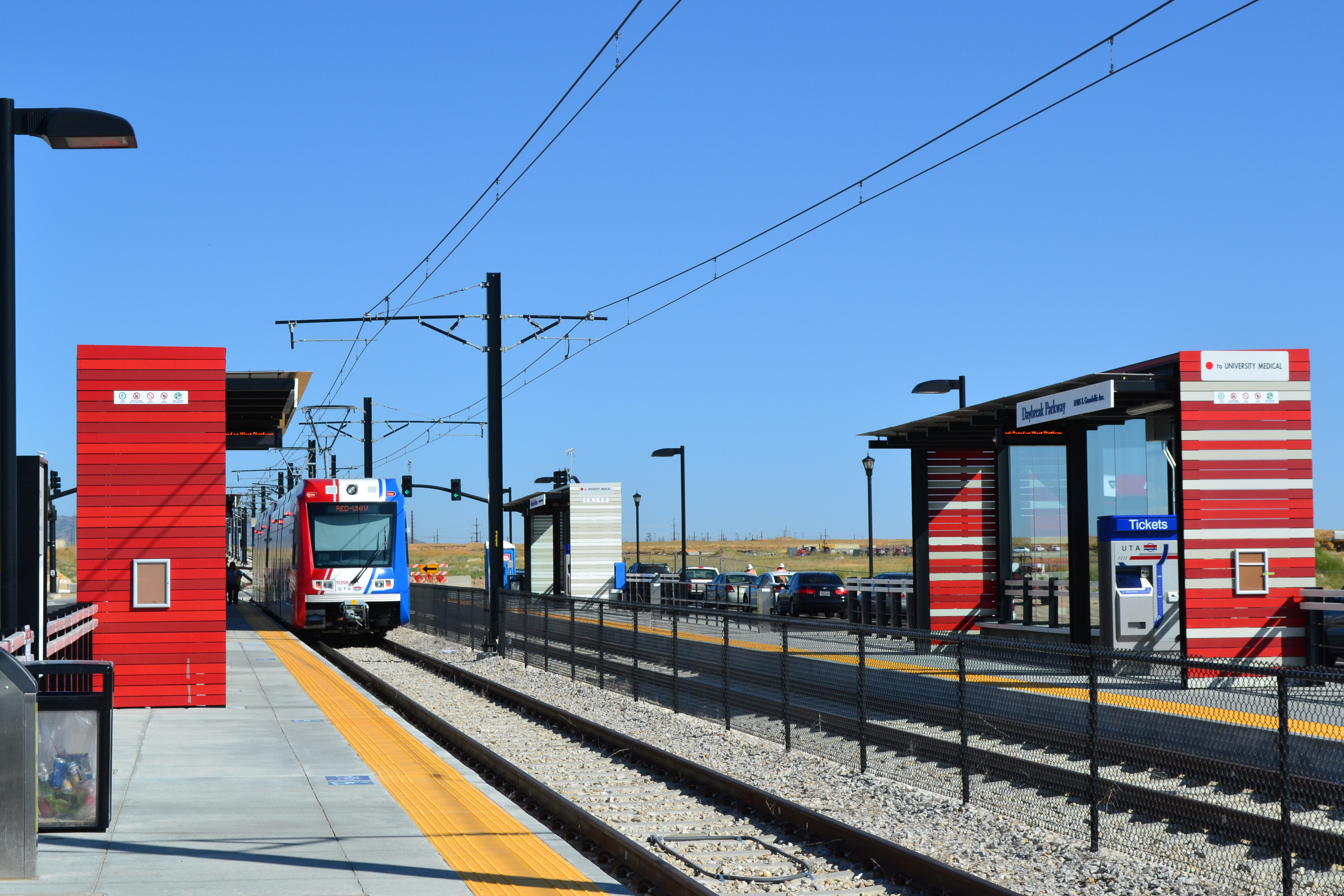
- Daybreak Parkway station platforms

General information
- Location: 11405 South Grandville Avenue; South Jordan, Utah; United States
- Coordinates: 40°32′38″N 112°00′51″W
- Owner: Utah Transit Authority (UTA)
- Platforms: 2 side platforms
- Tracks: 2
- Connections: UTA: 126, On Demand South Valley

Construction
- Structure type: At-grade
- Parking: 400 spaces
- Accessible: Yes

History
- Opened: August 7, 2011; 15 years ago

Services
Preceding station	Utah Transit Authority	Following station
South Jordan Downtown toward University Medical Center	Red Line	Terminus
Location

Daybreak Parkway station is a light rail station in the Daybreak community of South Jordan, Utah, United States, served by the Red Line of the Utah Transit Authority's (UTA) TRAX light rail system. The station is the southwestern terminus of the Red Line, which provides service from this station to the University of Utah.

== Description ==
The station is located at 11405 South Grandville Avenue (about 5150 West) with both of the station's side platforms situated in the median of that road. The station is accessible from West Daybreak Parkway as well as the Mountain View Corridor (SR-85), via the Mountain View Corridor/West Daybreak Parkway interchange just to the southwest. The station is immediately east of the University of Utah Health Care Occupational Medicine facility. The Daybreak branch of the Salt Lake County Library is just south of the station.

The station has a free Park and Ride lot with 400 parking spaces available, but there are plans for a total of about 600 parking spaces.

In the early planning stages, the station was referred to as "Daybreak South Station", but later changed to the current name.

The station is part of a railway right of way that was created specifically for the southwestern end of the Red Line. The station opened August 7, 2011, as part of the Red Line (Mid-Jordan) and is operated by the Utah Transit Authority.

== Music system ==
The station features a music system above the platform shelters that plays short excerpts every few minutes throughout the day from train-related songs such as "Midnight Special", "This Train", "I've Been Working on the Railroad" and "On the Atchison, Topeka and the Santa Fe".

The music system was created by Denver artist Jim Green and chosen by UTA, along with the city of South Jordan and its public arts advisory board, as well as Kennecott Land, Daybreak's developer. It was commissioned as part of UTA's Art in Transit program, which is also partially funded by the Federal Transit Administration.
