= University Medical Center station =

Light rail station in Salt Lake City, Utah, United States

University Medical Center
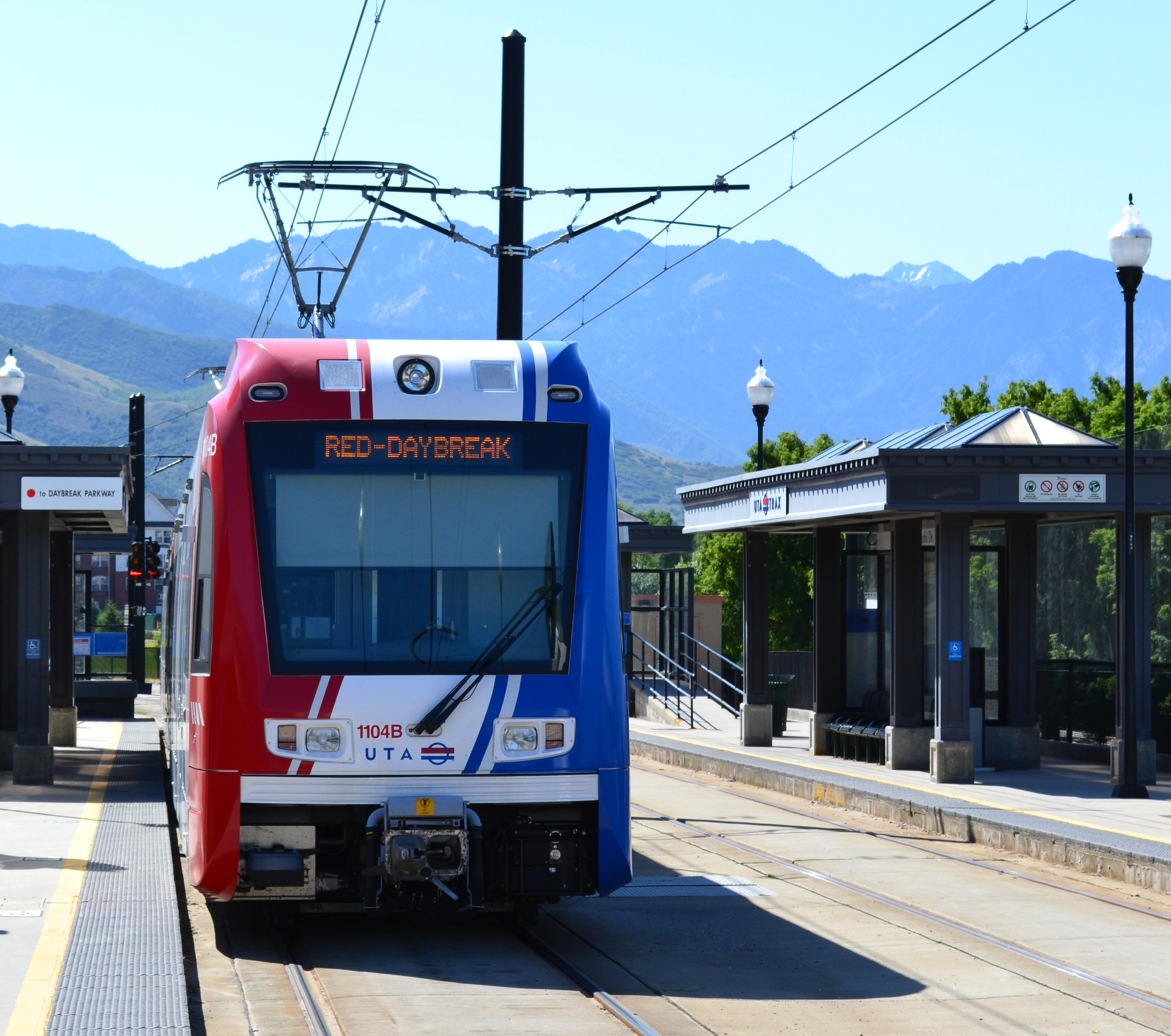
- Red Line train waits at University Medical Center station platform

General information
- Location: 10 North Mario Capecchi Drive; Salt Lake City, Utah; United States
- Coordinates: 40°46′10.43″N 111°50′19.74″W
- Owner: Utah Transit Authority (UTA)
- Platforms: 2 side platforms
- Tracks: 2
- Connections: UTA: 9, 17, 21, 213, 223, 473; High Valley Transit: 107

Construction
- Structure type: At-grade
- Parking: Limited parking nearby
- Accessible: Yes

History
- Opened: September 29, 2003; 22 years ago

Services
Preceding station	Utah Transit Authority	Following station
Terminus	Red Line	Fort Douglas toward Daybreak Parkway
Former services
Preceding station	Utah Transit Authority	Following station
Terminus	Sandy/University Line	Fort Douglas toward Sandy Civic Center
Fort Douglas toward Salt Lake Central	University Line	Terminus
Location

University Medical Center station, often referred to as simply Medical Center station, is a light rail station on the campus of the University of Utah in Salt Lake City, Utah, in the United States, served by the Red Line of the Utah Transit Authority's (UTA) TRAX light rail system. The Red Line provides service from this station (near the University of Utah Medical Center) to the Daybreak community of South Jordan.

== Description ==
The station is located on the campus of the University of Utah at 10 North Mario Capecchi Drive (formerly called Medical Drive), that portion of Medical Drive, as well as the nearby Wasatch Drive, was renamed and re-signed as Mario Capecchi Drive in February 2008. with both side platforms situated on the west side of the street. The station provides service for the nearby medical facilities, including the University of Utah Hospital, Primary Children's Medical Center, the Huntsman Cancer Institute, and the Moran Eye Center. Unlike many TRAX stations, University Medical Center does not have a Park and Ride lot, however, UTA indicates that there is "limited parking" available. The station is part of a railway right of way that was created specifically for the former University Line. The station opened on 29 September 2003 and is operated by the Utah Transit Authority.
