= 5600 West BRT =

Proposed Bus Rapid Transit line in western Salt Lake County, Utah. United States

5600 West

Overview
- Status: In Development
- Owner: Utah Transit Authority (UTA)
- Locale: Western Salt Lake County, Utah; United States
- Termini: 5600 West Old Bingham Highway; Salt Lake International Airport
- Stations: 18

Service
- Type: Enhanced Bus
- Route number: 256
- Operator: UTA

History
- Planned opening: April 2028

Technical
- Line length: ~29.0 miles (46.7 km)
- Operating speed: 45 mph (72 km/h) max.

5600 West Bus Route (formerly 5600 West BRT) is a proposed Enhanced Bus line in western Salt Lake County, Utah, United States, that will be operated by the Utah Transit Authority (UTA). It will run along 5600 West (SR-172) for 29 miles (46.7 km) from 5600 West Old Bingham Hwy TRAX Station in West Jordan to Salt Lake City International Airport.

== Description ==
Formerly proposed as a Bus Rapid Transit (BRT) line with phased implementation, it was later reduced to an Enhanced Bus route without much dedicated infrastructure. It's now planned to be implemented within a single phase.

The route will originate at the 5600 West Old Bingham Highway TRAX station where it will connect to the Red Line and run north along 5600 West before heading east towards Salt Lake City International Airport, where it will connect to the Green Line that heads into downtown Salt Lake City.

== History ==
In 2010, while expressing their support for the 5600 West BRT project, West Valley City indicated that they do not ever foresee the need for a light rail line along South 5600 West. Of particular concern was UTA's plans to secure the additional right of way necessary for a future TRAX line. UTA responded to the objections by indicating that the TRAX line may not be built for several decades, but added that "It's always better to overplan and underconstruct than the other way around."

At one point in the development stages, an additional stop further south in Herriman was planned. However, by 2013 this stop had been dropped from the plans.

The original plan for the project was as follows:

Phase 1 of the 5600 West BRT line will run along a 5-mile (8.0 km) segment of South 5600 West (SR-172) from 6200 South to 2700 West within Kearns and West Valley City. From the northern end of this segment, it will connect with Downtown Salt Lake City along a route (without any stops) following West 2700 North (Lake Park Boulevard), Bangerter Highway (SR-154), 21st South Freeway (SR-201), and Interstate 15 (I-15). The initial route is projected to include 6 stops and run at 10-15 minute intervals and cost $100 million. UTA had anticipated having Phase 1 of the 5600 West BRT operational by the end of 2015.

Phase 2 will extend the route to a total of 24 miles (39 km) from Herriman to the Salt Lake City International Airport, with the bus connection to Downtown Salt Lake City being eliminated. Phase 2 will also include connections to four TRAX stations: the Airport station on the Green Line and the 5600 West Old Bingham Highway, South Jordan Parkway, and Daybreak Parkway stations on the Red Line. Phase 2 was originally estimated to be completed sometime before 2025. Phase 3 calls for the eventual replacement of this BRT line with a TRAX light rail line along the entire Phase 2 corridor. There is no estimated completion date for Phase 3, except that it will not be until after Phase 2.

== Route ==
UTA has assigned the number 256 to the route.

=== West Jordan ===
The route starts in West Jordan at the 5600 West Old Bingham Highway Trax Station which is served by the Red Line, and will proceed north on 5600 West, stopping at 9000 South, 7800 South, and 7000 South until it enters Kearns.

=== Kearns ===
After leaving West Jordan, the bus stops only at 6200 South, before leaving Kearns and entering West Valley City.

=== West Valley City ===
Just after entering West Valley City the 5600 West bus will reach the 5400 South stop at about 5400 South. Another Park and Ride lot is planned for the area of this stop as well. After crossing West 5400 South (SR-173), it will continue north along South 5600 West and will cross West 5200 South (Henley Drive/Westridge Boulevard), West 5100 South (Mountain Men Drive), West 4970 South (South Garden Ridge Road), and West 4700 South before arriving at the 4700 South stop. Continuing on along South 5400 West it will cross West 4470 South (Chantry Way), West 4420 South (Deercrest Drive), West 4360 South, before passing in front of Hunter High School and crossing over the Utah and Salt Lake Canal.

Just north of the canal the 5600 West bus will cross West 4100 South and then continue north to West 3500 South (SR-171) and the 3500 South stop. The 3500 South stop will include a connection to the 3500 South bus route (35) and is anticipated to include as Park and Ride lot as well. After crossing West 3500 South it will continue north along 5600 West and will cross West 3100 South before reaching West 2700 South (Parkway Boulevard/Lake Park Boulevard) and the 2700 South stop. This stop is also anticipated to include a Park and Ride lot. It will then proceed to stop at 2700 South, where it will connect to the new bus route 26 and 17. The bus will then proceed north along 5600 West until it enters Salt Lake City, where it will cross SR-201.

=== Salt Lake City ===
After entering Salt Lake City, the bus will continue north until reaches the International Center, where it will make a stop. After it will proceed east along Amelia Earhart Drive, and then turn back south on Wright Brothers Drive heading to the entrance ramp onto I-80, where it will then exit off at the Airport, and proceed to the terminal, where it will stop.
Leaving the airport, the bus will continue east on North Temple, stopping at the 1940 West North Temple, Power, Jackson/Euclid, and North Temple Bridge/Guadalupe Green Line stations. The bus will then turn onto State Street (US-89) before turning onto 200 South to reach the Salt Lake Central station. It will then proceed back along the same route but heading in the opposite direction.

== Stops ==
The stops for the enhanced bus route are as follows:

5600 West Enhanced Bus (West Jordan – Salt Lake City International Airport)
Stop Name (Note: Stop names are only tentative/suggested and are not yet finalized (except the TRAX stations).)	City	Southbound Station	Northbound Station	UTA Bus Connections (Note: Bus connection routes are current as of Change Day, April 13, 2014)	Park and Ride Lot	Notes & Other Connections
Northern Terminus
Salt Lake Central	Salt Lake City	325 South 600 West		2A, 2B, 209, 220, 400, 509, 513	Yes	701 TRAX Blue Line 750 FrontRunner
North Temple Bridge/Guadalupe	Salt Lake City	500 West North Temple		3, 200, 400, F453, 470X	No	704 TRAX Green Line 750 FrontRunner
Jackson/Euclid	Salt Lake City	820 West North Temple		1, 451, F453	No	704 TRAX Green Line
Power	Salt Lake City	1480 West North Temple		1, 205, 451, F453, 551	No	704 TRAX Green Line
1940 West North Temple	Salt Lake City	1940 West North Temple		271, 451, F453, 551	No	704 TRAX Green Line
Airport	Salt Lake City	700 North Terminal Drive		453, 454	No	Serves Salt Lake International Airport; 704 TRAX Green Line
International Center	Salt Lake City			236, 236EP	No	
California Avenue	Salt Lake City				No	
2700 South	West Valley City			26, 17	No	
3500 South	West Valley City			35	Yes	
4100 South	West Valley City			47	No	
4700 South	West Valley City			47	No	
5400 South	West Valley City			54	Yes	
6200 South	Kearns			62, 54	Yes	
7000 South	West Jordan				No	
7800 South	West Jordan			F578	Yes	
9000 South	West Jordan				Yes	
5600 West Old Bingham Highway	West Jordan	5651 West Old Bingham Highway			Yes	703 TRAX Red Line
Southern Terminus

== See also ==
- Mountain View Corridor
- Utah Transit Authority Bus Rapid Transit
