= 3500 South MAX =

Former bus rapid transit service in Salt Lake County, Utah, United States

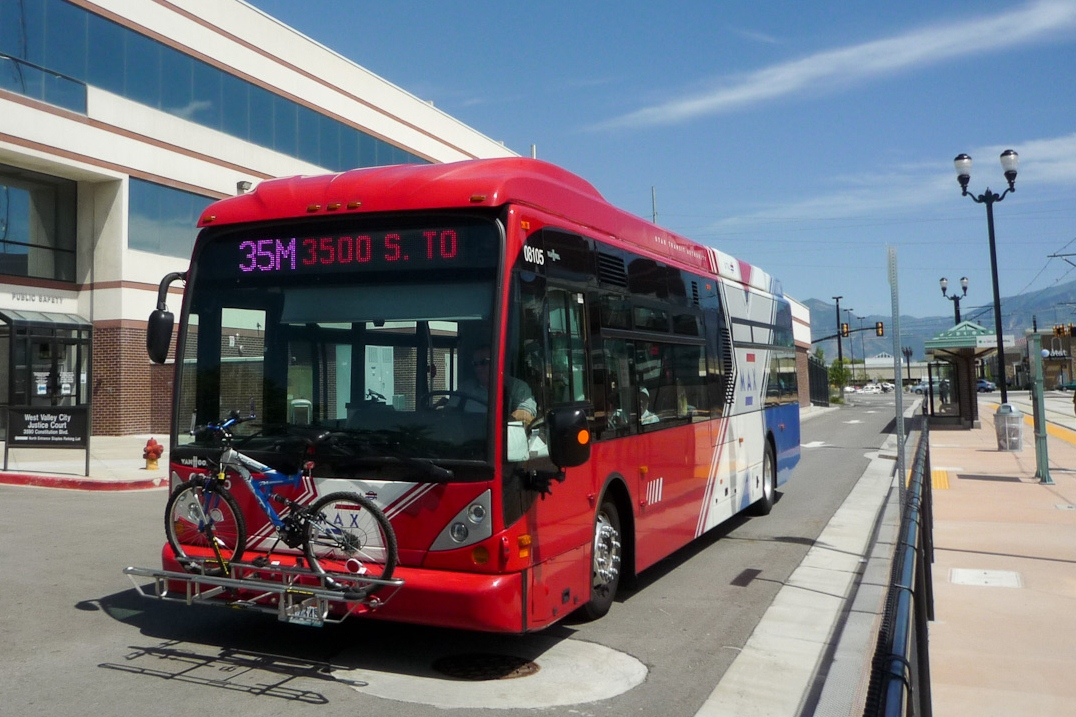
- 3500 South MAX bus at West Valley Central station

Overview
- Status: Discontinued
- Owner: Utah Transit Authority (UTA)
- Locale: Salt Lake County, Utah, U.S.
- Termini: Magna; Millcreek station
- Stations: 26 (Note: Most "stops" on the 3500 South MAX line (except those in the Magna Loop) have two separate stations, one for each direction of travel and are located on the opposite side of the road and sometimes on the opposite side of an intersection. On sections of the line where MAX has dedicated lanes in the middle of the road, the stations are located in the median. The two TRAX stations, Millcreek and West Valley Central, have only one MAX station (although West Valley Central has two side by side shelters).)

Service
- Type: Bus rapid transit (BRT)
- System: MAX
- Route number: 35M
- Rolling stock: Van Hool A300L
- Daily ridership: 4,200 daily (2010)

History
- Opened: July 14, 2008
- Closed: April 5, 2020 (temporary); August 7, 2022 (permanent)

Technical
- Line length: 10.8 mi (17.4 km)
- Operating speed: 40 mph (64 km/h) (max.)

3500 South MAX was a bus rapid transit (BRT) line in northwestern Salt Lake County, Utah, United States, operated by the Utah Transit Authority (UTA) that ran between Magna, West Valley City, and South Salt Lake. It opened for service on July 14, 2008, and was the first of several BRT lines that UTA is planning in the Salt Lake Valley, Weber County, and Utah County.

The BRT line was the first and last route to operate with the name MAX (UTA's former branding of its BRT lines). The line was temporarily suspended on April 5, 2020, due to the impact of the COVID-19 pandemic on public transport, and in the summer of 2022, UTA announced that the line would be permanently discontinued as of August 7, 2022.

== Description ==
The 3500 South MAX line connected Magna with the West Valley Intermodal Hub in West Valley City and the Millcreek TRAX station in South Salt Lake along a route 10.8 miles (17.4 km) on 3500/3300 South (SR 171). (Note: Given line length is for the main line only, and does not include the "Magna Loop") Costs for the project totaled $17 million (equivalent to $25,421,000 in 2025); a light rail extension along the same route would have cost $100 million (equivalent to $149,536,000 in 2025). (Note: Some sources report the cost of the 3500 South MAX as $8 Million) Each of the initial 22 stations along the MAX line were designed by University of Utah architecture students. The 3500 South MAX runs Monday through Saturday (no Sunday service) from about 6:00 am to midnight (every fifteen minutes on weekdays and every half-hour on Saturdays) to coincide with the TRAX schedule (except Sunday service). Original plans were to discontinue MAX service between the Millcreek and West Valley Central TRAX stations once the West Valley extension of the TRAX Green Line was completed. However, said service still continued years after the Green Line opened. (Note: Bus connection routes are current as of Change Day, April 13, 2014)

The 3500 South MAX connected with the TRAX Green Line at the West Valley Central Station and with the Blue and Red lines at the Millcreek station. The Green Line provides service from West Valley City to the Salt Lake City International Airport via Downtown Salt Lake City, the Blue Line provides service from Draper to Downtown Salt Lake City, and the Red Line provides service from the University of Utah to the Daybreak Community in South Jordan in southwest Salt Lake Valley. The original vision was for the 3500 South MAX to also connect with the future 5600 West MAX BRT line near 3500 South and 5600 West (SR 172). (The 5600 West MAX will initially provide service along 5600 West from 6200 South in Kearns north to 2700 South and then connected with Downtown Salt Lake City [including the Salt Lake City Intermodal Hub].)

== Route ==
The 3500 South MAX was designated as UTA Route 35M. Although 35M was discontinued, the majority of the bus stops were shared with UTA route 35, a standard bus route servicing 3500 S. UTA encourages riders to consider route 35 the replacement of the discontinued MAX route.

=== Magna Loop ===
The "Magna Loop" (Note: While somewhat similar, as of Change Day, April 15, 2012, (and still in effect as of Change Day, August 17, 2014) the loop that Route 35 (local bus) makes through Magna does not follow the same route as the 3500 South MAX (Route 35M). Among other differences, Route 35 heads back east on West 3100 South rather than West 3500 South.) is only included in about half of the 3500 South MAX runs, with the morning runs eastbound to the Millcreek Station starting with the Magna Loop and the afternoon and evening runs westbound to Magna ending with the Magna Loop. The Magna Loop runs counterclockwise (morning, afternoon, and evening) through Magna beginning at the westbound 8400 West Station (located at 8370 West 3500 South) and ends at the eastbound 8400 West Station (located at 8385 West 3500 South). As there are no MAX stations within the Magna Loop, along this section of the line (when included) the 3500 South MAX line acts as a local bus and stops at all designated bus stops as requested. The first stop for the Magna Loop is at 3435 South on 8400 West (SR-111/Bacchus Highway). Heading north on South 8400 West it has a stop at 3175 South before crossing West 3100 South. The Church of Jesus Christ of Latter-day Saints (LDS Church) has designated the parking lot for its chapel at 3084 South 8400 West as a Park and Ride lot. The next stops in the Magna Loop on South 8400 West are at 3049 South, 2975 South, 2889 South, and 2835 South. Heading west on Magna Main Street (West 2700 South) it has stops at 8574 West, 8720 West, 8798 West, and 9038 West before turning south on South 9150 West. Heading south on South 9150 West it immediately has a stop at 2702 South, followed by 2832 South, 2930 South, and 3004 South before turning west again onto West 3100 South. Continuing west it has a stop at 9196 West 3100 South before turning south again on South 9200 West. At about 3300 South the road curves to the southeast and South 9200 West becomes Copperbend Road. At about 8975 West, the road curves to the east and Copperbend Road becomes West 3500 South. Completing the Magna Loop on West 3500 South are stops at 8927 West, 8535 West, and 8385 West before it crosses South 8400 West and ends the Magna Loop at the 8400 West Station (8385 West 3500 South).

=== Magna to Millcreek Station (eastbound) ===
Starting in Magna, the first station on the 3500 South MAX eastbound line (which is preceded by the Magna Loop on morning runs) is the 8400 West Station (8385 West 3500 South). From this station it heads east on West 3500 South (which quickly narrows from five lanes to three lanes) to the 8000 West Station (8013 West 3500 South). Heading east it crosses South 8000 West before reaching the 7200 West Station (7225 West 3500 South). Just after crossing South 7200 West, it leaves Magna and enters West Valley City. Continuing east it crosses South 6400 West and reaches the 6400 West Station (6361 West 3500 South). The LDS Church has designated the parking lot for its chapel at 3450 South 6400 West as a Park and Ride lot. From the 6400 West Station it continues east, passing the north end of South 6000 West and crossing South 5600 West; just east of South 5600 West, West 3500 South expands back to five lanes. Immediately after crossing West 5600 West is the 5600 West Station (5551 West 3500 South) and the UTA Park and Ride at 5527 West 3500 South. (This station will be future connection with the 5600 West MAX BRT line.) From that station it continues east to pass the north end of South 5200 West and cross South 4800 West before reaching the 4800 West Station (4725 West 3500 South). Continuing east it crosses South 4400 West, passes by the south side of Jordan Valley Medical Center West Valley Campus, and crosses South 4000 West before reaching the 4000 West Station (3955 West 3500 South). After South 4000 West, West 3500 South widens to six lanes (three westbound, two eastbound, and a center turn lane).

Continuing east the 3500 South MAX crosses Bangerter Highway (SR-154) and the two center lanes of West 3500 South become dedicated lanes for MAX use only. Further east it quickly reaches the 3600 West Station (3575 West 3500 South), (Note: As of October 2014, UTA still mistakenly indicates that the address for the eastbound 3600 West Station is 3616 West 3500 South and the westbound 3600 West Station is 3575 West 3500 South. However, the addresses provided by UTA for these two stations are transposed. Both stations are located in the median of 3500 South on the right side of the dedicated lanes, but on the far side of the intersection given the direction of travel. Therefore, if the given address were correct, it would have the MAX buses approaching to the right of the stations in the left dedicated lane. The result would be having passengers attempting to board the bus from the left side, which is not possible given the current MAX buses, as well as MAX buses crossing each other's lane of travel. These transposed addresses, as provided by UTA, are also repeated by other sources, such as Google Maps.) with the station being located in the median of 3500 South. Continuing east it crosses South 3200 West and then reaches South 2700 West (Constitution Boulevard); just west of South 2700 West the MAX dedicated lanes end. At South 2700 West (with the TRAX Green Line in the median of that street) the 3500 South MAX turns south onto southbound lanes of South 2700 West. It then turns west onto a one-way section of West 3590 South (Lehman Avenue) and passes between the West Valley City Police Department and the West Valley City Hall before immediately reaching its next stop, the West Valley Intermodal Hub. (This short one-way section of West 3590 South is immediately north of the TRAX Green Line right of way and the TRAX passenger platforms for the West Valley Central Station.) (The West Valley Intermodal Hub and surrounding civic buildings are all part of a transit-oriented development called Fairbourne Station.) Immediately after this stop, it heads north on South 2810 West (Market Street) until it reaches West 3500 South once again. (Route 35 follows a somewhat similar course to West Valley Central, except at it heads further south on South 2700 West before turning east West 3650 South [Lancer Way]. Route 35 then heads west to the local bus stops at West Valley Central and, upon leaving the station, it retraces its path back to West 3500 South.) The 3500 South MAX then heads east once again on West 3500 South, this time crossing South 2700 West (and the TRAX Green Line tracks) before passing by the north end of Valley Fair Mall and crossing under I-215 (Belt Route).

Just east of I-215 the 3500 South MAX reaches the Decker Lake Drive Station (2223 West 3500 South) and then crosses South 2200 West (Decker Lake Drive). East of South 2200 West, West 3500 South has seven lanes (but no MAX dedicated lanes). Heading east it crosses Redwood Road (SR-68/1700 West) before reaching the Redwood Station (1685 West 3500 South). Just east of that station, West 3500 South curves slightly to the north to become West 3400 South. Following this street, the 3500 South MAX reaches the 1200 West Station (1219 West 3300 South) and immediately passes the north end of South 1200 West where after West 3400 South curves due east and becomes West 3300 South. Immediately thereafter the 3500 South MAX crosses over the Jordan River and leaves West Valley City before entering South Salt Lake. Continuing east on West 3300 South it crosses South 900 West and reaches the 900 West Station (889 West 3300 South), which is just north of the Salt Lake County Sheriff's Office complex (which includes the Salt Lake County Jail and the headquarters of the Unified Police Department of Greater Salt Lake). (At South 900 West, Route 35 heads south to West 3655 South and circles around the Utah Transit Authority's main offices. After heading east on West 3655 South Route 35 heads north on South 700 West before heading east again on West 3300 South.) After passing the Sheriff's Office, the 3500 South MAX continues east on West 3300 South and passes by the north end of South 500 West before crossing under I-15. Just after I-15 it heads north on South 300 West to Gregson Avenue (West 3090 South). It then heads east on Gregson Avenue until it turns south on South 230 West (Washighton Street). Finally, it continues south until it reaches the end of the line at the Millcreek Station (210 West 3300 South).

=== Millcreek station to Magna (westbound) ===
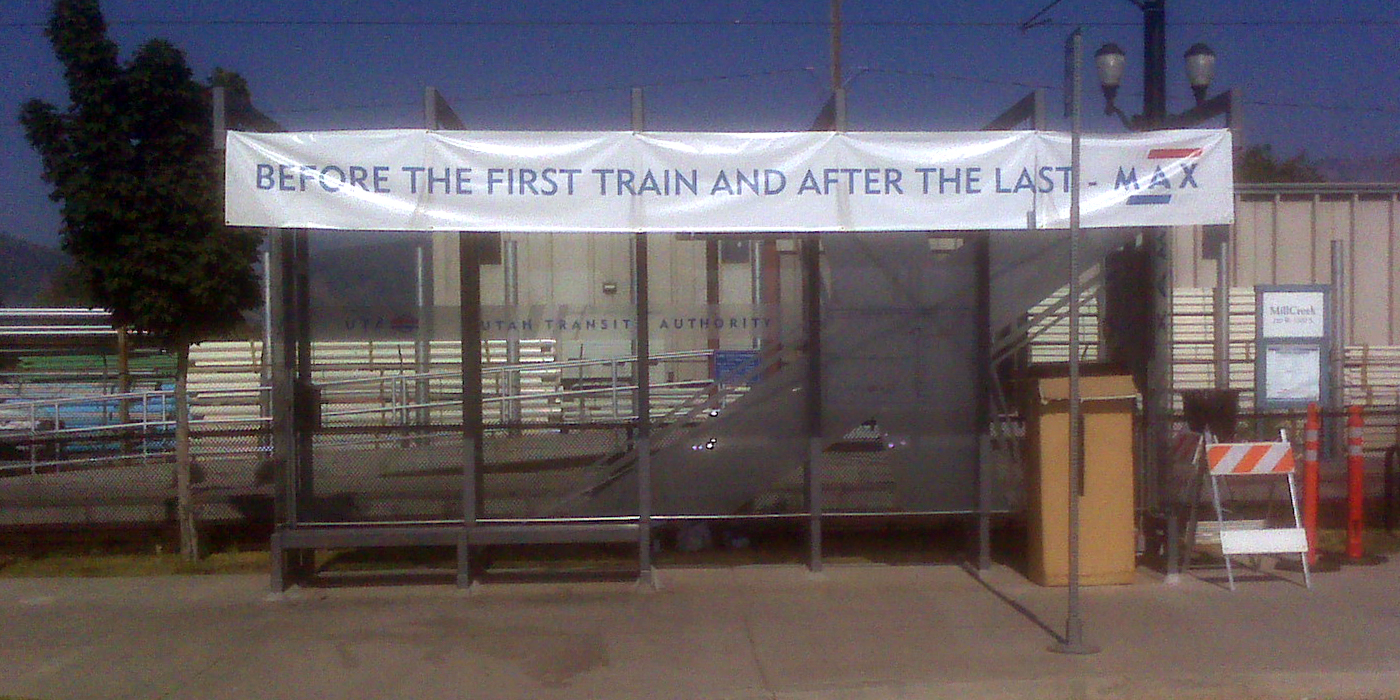
The MAX shelter at Millcreek station

The westbound route back to Magna is very similar to the eastbound route from Magna, but there are a few differences. Starting at the Millcreek Station, the westbound 3500 South MAX heads south briefly on South 230 West before heading west on West 3300 South. After crossing South 300 West and crossing under I-15, it crosses South 900 West before reaching the 900 West Station (940 West 3300 South), which is just north of the Salt Lake County Sheriff's Office complex. Continuing west is crosses over the Jordan River (leaving South Salt Lake and entering West Valley City). After the Jordan River it reaches the 1200 West Station (1226 West 3300 South). After that station West 3300 South curves south to become West 3400 South and then curves back to due west to become West 3500 South. After crossing Redwood Road, the 3500 South MAX reaches the Redwood Road Station (1720 West 3500 South). Continuing west it reaches the Decker Lake Drive Station (2040 West 3500 South). After crossing South 2200 West, it crosses under I-215 and reaches South 2700 West. At South 2700 West it turns south and follows the same route to and from the West Valley Intermodal Hub (through Fairbourne Station) as the eastbound 3500 South MAX (south on South 2700 West, west on West 3950 South, stop at Hub, and north on South 2810 West), except that upon reaching West 3500 South again, it heads west. Continuing west on West 3500 South (now in its dedicated lanes) it crosses South 3200 West and South 3600 west before reaching the 3600 West Station (3616 West 3500 South, with the station being located in the median of West 3500 South.

Further west the two dedicated lanes (for MAX use only) end and the 3500 South MAX crosses Bangerter Highway before reaching the 4000 West Station (3980 West 3500 South). After that station it crosses South 4000 West; and West 3500 South narrows to five lanes. Heading further west, it passes by the south side of the Jordan Valley Medical Center West Valley Campus and then crosses South 4400 West and South 4800 West before reaching the 4800 West Station (4820 West 3500 South). Following that station, it passes the north end of South 5200 West and crosses South 5600 West before reaching the 5600 West Station (5616 West 3500 South), which has the UTA Park and Ride just south of the eastbound 5600 West Station. (This station will also be the future connection with the 5600 West MAX BRT line.) West of South 5600 West, West 3500 South narrows to three lanes. Continuing west the 3500 South MAX passes the north end of South 6000 West and crosses South 6400 West before reaching the 6400 West Station (6450 West 3500 South), with the Park and Ride at the nearby LDS Church. Heading further west, it leaves West Valley City and enters Magna before crossing South 7200 West and reaching the 7200 West Station (7250 West 3500 South). From that station it heads west to cross South 8000 West and reach the 8000 West Station (8010 West 3500 South). Finally, it heads west until it reaches the end of the line at the 8400 South Station (210 West 3300 South), unless it is an afternoon or evening run, in which case it will continue through the Magna Loop.

== Stops ==
3500 South MAX (Magna - West Valley City - South Salt Lake)
Stop Name	City	Eastbound Station	Westbound Station	UTA Bus Connections	Park and Ride Lot	Notes & Other Connections
West end of the line
Magna Loop (Note: Magna Loop included only for the morning eastbound runs and the afternoon and evening westbound runs)	Magna	Counterclockwise route (Note: Magna Loop 3500 South MAX (35M) "local" stops include the following: 3435, 3175, 3049, 2975, 2889, and 2835 South on 8400 West; 8574, 8720, 8798, and 9038 West on Main Street (2700 South); 2702, 2832, 2930, and 3004 South on 9150 West; 9196 West on 3100 South; and 8927 and 8535 West on 3500 South)		35	Yes	All "local" stops within Magna Loop; Park and Ride at LDS Church parking lot at 3084 South 8400 West
8400 West	Magna	8385 West 3500 South	8370 West 3500 South	35	No	
8000 West	Magna	8013 West 3500 South	8010 West 3500 South	35	No	
7200 West	Magna	7225 West 3500 South	7250 West 3500 South	35	No	
6400 West	West; Valley; City	6361 West 3500 South	6450 West 3500 South	35	Yes	Park and Ride at LDS Church parking lot at 3450 South 6400 West
5600 West	West; Valley; City	5551 West 3500 South	5616 West 3500 South	35, F556*	Yes	Route F556 stops are on South 5600 West; Future connection with the 5600 West MAX; BRT line
4800 West	West; Valley; City	4725 West 3500 South	4820 West 3500 South	35, 248*	No	Route 248 bus stops are on South 4800 West
4000 West	West; Valley; City	3955 West 3500 South	3980 West 3500 South	35, 240*, 248	No	Serves Jordan Valley Medical Center West; Valley Campus; Route 240 southbound bus stop is on South 4000 West
3600 West	West; Valley; City	3575 West 3500 South	3616 West 3500 South	35*, 240*, 248*, 509*	No	MAX stations are located in the median of West 3500 South; Connections for local bus routes are curbside
West Valley Intermodal Hub	West; Valley; City	2820 West 3590 South		35*, 41*, 227*, 232*, 240*, 248*, 509*, 513*	Yes	Serves Fairbourne Station (including the West Valley City offices) and Valley Fair Mall; 704 TRAX Green Line; The MAX stop is immediately north of the TRAX passenger platforms, while other the bus connections are southwest of the TRAX passenger platforms
Decker Lake Drive	West; Valley; City	2223 West 3500 South	2040 West 3500 South	35	No	
Redwood Road	West; Valley; City	1685 West 3500 South	1720 West 3500 South	35	No	
1200 West	West; Valley; City	1219 West 3300 South	1226 West 3300 South	35	No	
900 West	South; Salt; Lake	889 West 3300 South	940 West 3300 South	35	No	Serves Salt Lake County Sheriff's Office complex, including the Salt Lake County Jail and the headquarters of the Unified Police Department of Greater Salt Lake
Millcreek Station	South; Salt; Lake	210 West 3300 South		33, 35	Yes	701 TRAX Blue Line; 703 TRAX Red Line
East end of the line
*Indicates bus connections which do not connect directly at station/stop, but are easily accessible nearby (as indicated)

== See also ==
- Utah Transit Authority bus rapid transit
