= Jackson/Euclid station =

Light rail station in Salt Lake City, Utah, United States

Jackson/Euclid
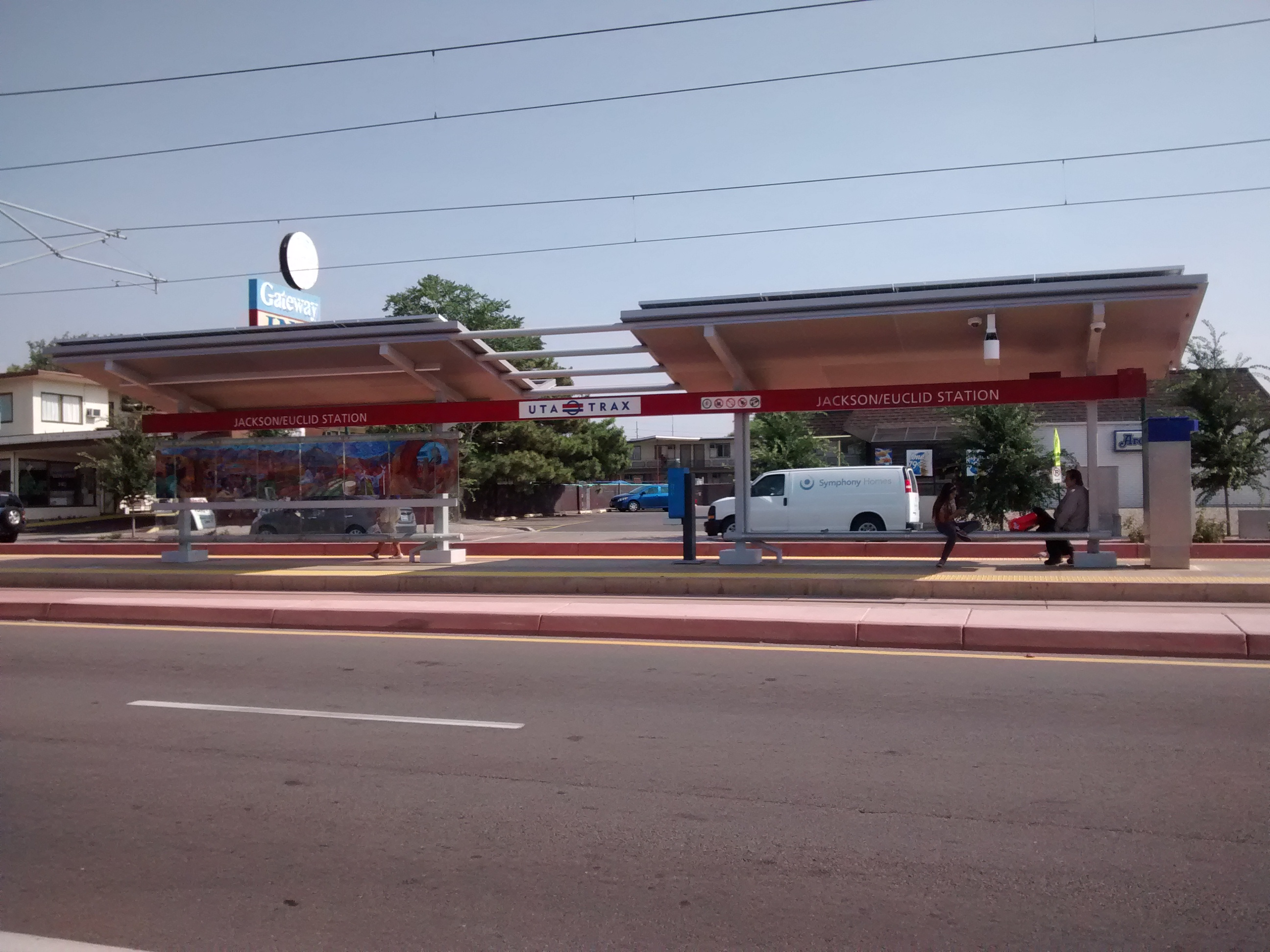
- Jackson/Euclid station platform from the north

General information
- Location: 820 W North Temple; Salt Lake City, Utah; United States
- Coordinates: 40°46′17.5″N 111°54′54″W
- Owner: Utah Transit Authority (UTA)
- Platforms: 1 island platform
- Connections: UTA: 1, 451, F453, On Demand Salt Lake City Westside

Construction
- Structure type: At-grade
- Accessible: Yes

History
- Opened: April 14, 2013; 13 years ago

Services
Preceding station	Utah Transit Authority	Following station
Fairpark toward Airport	Green Line	North Temple Bridge/Guadalupe toward West Valley Central
Proposed services
Preceding station	Utah Transit Authority	Following station
Fairpark toward Airport	Blue Line	North Temple Bridge/Guadalupe toward Draper Town Center
Fairpark toward Airport	Orange Line	North Temple Bridge/Guadalupe toward Arapeen
Location

Jackson/Euclid station is a light rail station in Salt Lake City, Utah serviced by the Green Line of the Utah Transit Authority's (UTA) TRAX system. The Green Line provides service from the Salt Lake City International Airport to West Valley City (via Downtown Salt Lake City and connects with the rest of the TRAX system, as well as UTA's FrontRunner commuter rail and S Line streetcar.

== Description ==
The station is located at 820 West North Temple Street, with the island platform in the median of the street. Unlike many TRAX stations, Jackson/Euclid does not have a Park and Ride lot. Like many other UTA stations, this station has art work included in its design. The art work for the Jackson/Euclid station is murals that include a colorful collection of images that reflect the vibrant neighborhoods along the Airport TRAX Line. The set of murals is called Comunidades en Solidaridad: A Collective Transformative Vision and was designed by Ruby Chacon of Salt Lake City. The station is part of a railway right of way that was created specifically for the Green Line. The station opened on 14 April 2013 and is operated by the Utah Transit Authority. It is also one of four TRAX stations (all of which are located the north end of the Green Line) that is powered by solar panels located on top of the station's canopy through a project which was initially funded in part by Rocky Mountain Power. Jackson/Euclid is one of only two UTA stations to include a slash in its name, the other being the following station of North Temple Bridge/Guadalupe.
