= Fairpark station =

Light rail station in Salt Lake City, Utah, United States

Fairpark
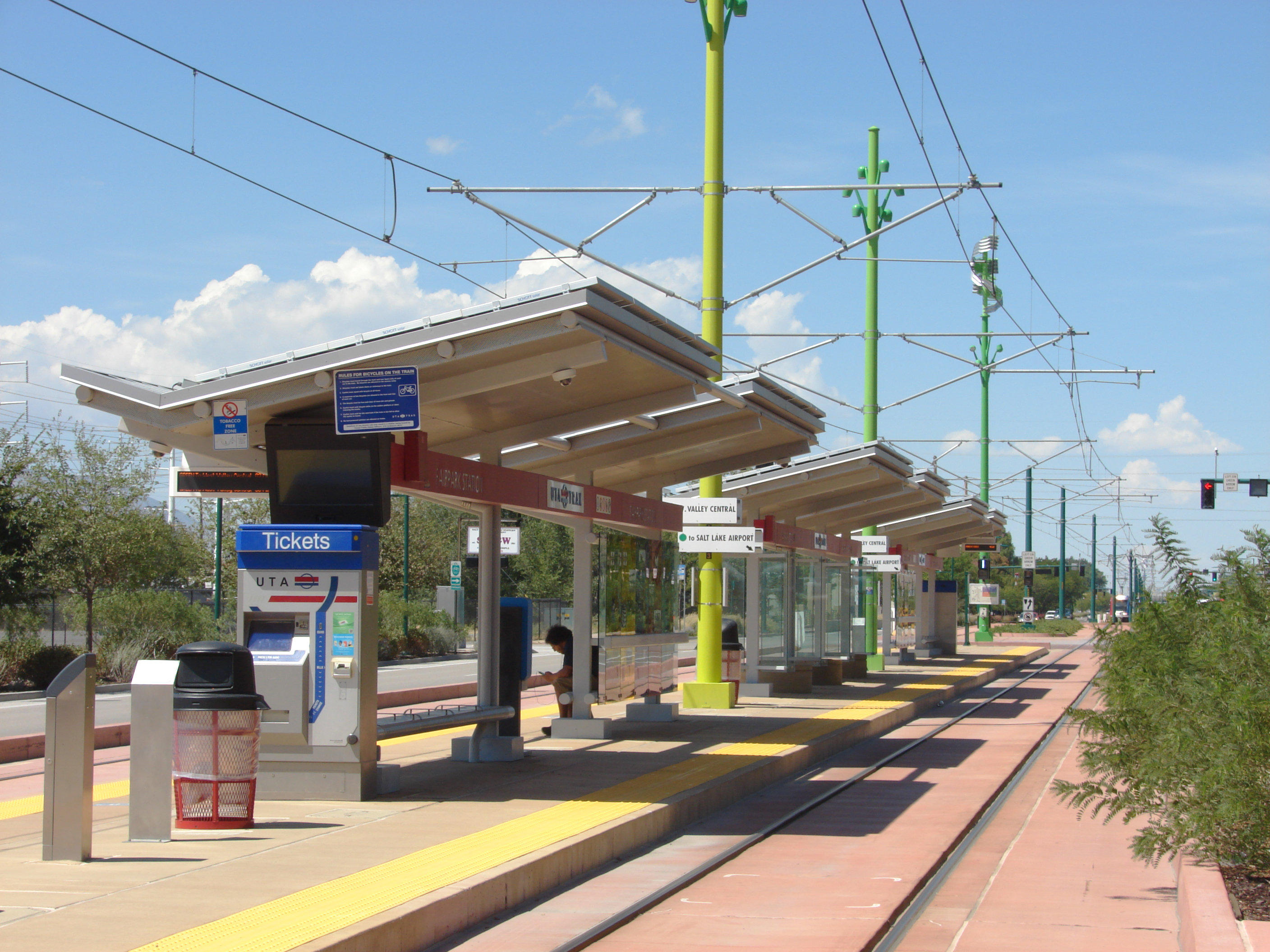
- Fairpark station platform

General information
- Location: 1150 W North Temple; Salt Lake City, Utah; United States
- Coordinates: 40°46′17.5″N 111°55′28″W
- Owner: Utah Transit Authority (UTA)
- Platforms: 1 island platform
- Connections: UTA: 451, F453, On Demand Salt Lake City Westside

Construction
- Structure type: At-grade
- Accessible: Yes

History
- Opened: April 14, 2013; 13 years ago

Services
Preceding station	Utah Transit Authority	Following station
Power toward Airport	Green Line	Jackson/Euclid toward West Valley Central
Proposed services
Preceding station	Utah Transit Authority	Following station
Power toward Airport	Blue Line	Jackson/Euclid toward Draper Town Center
Power toward Airport	Orange Line	Jackson/Euclid toward Arapeen
Location

Fairpark station is a light rail station in Salt Lake City, Utah, served by the Green Line of the Utah Transit Authority's (UTA) TRAX system. The Green Line provides service from the Salt Lake International Airport to West Valley City (via Downtown Salt Lake City and connects with the rest of the TRAX system, as well as UTA's FrontRunner commuter rail and S Line streetcar.

== Description ==
The station is located at 1150 West North Temple Street (just south of the Utah State Fairgrounds), with the island platform is located in the median of the street. Although not open yet, this station will have a Park and Ride lot with a yet to be announced number of spaces. Like many other UTA stations, this station has art work included in its design. The art work for the Fairpark station is murals that include various images depicting the history of the area. The set of murals is called Fairpark Convergence and was designed by Nancy Gutkin O’Neil of New Orleans, Louisiana. The station is part of a railway right of way that was created specifically for the Green Line. The station opened on 14 April 2013 and is operated by the Utah Transit Authority. It is also one of four TRAX stations (all of which are located the north end of the Green Line) that is powered by solar panels located on top of the station's canopy through a project which was initially funded in part by Rocky Mountain Power.
