= River Trail station =

Light rail station in West Valley City, Utah, United States

River Trail
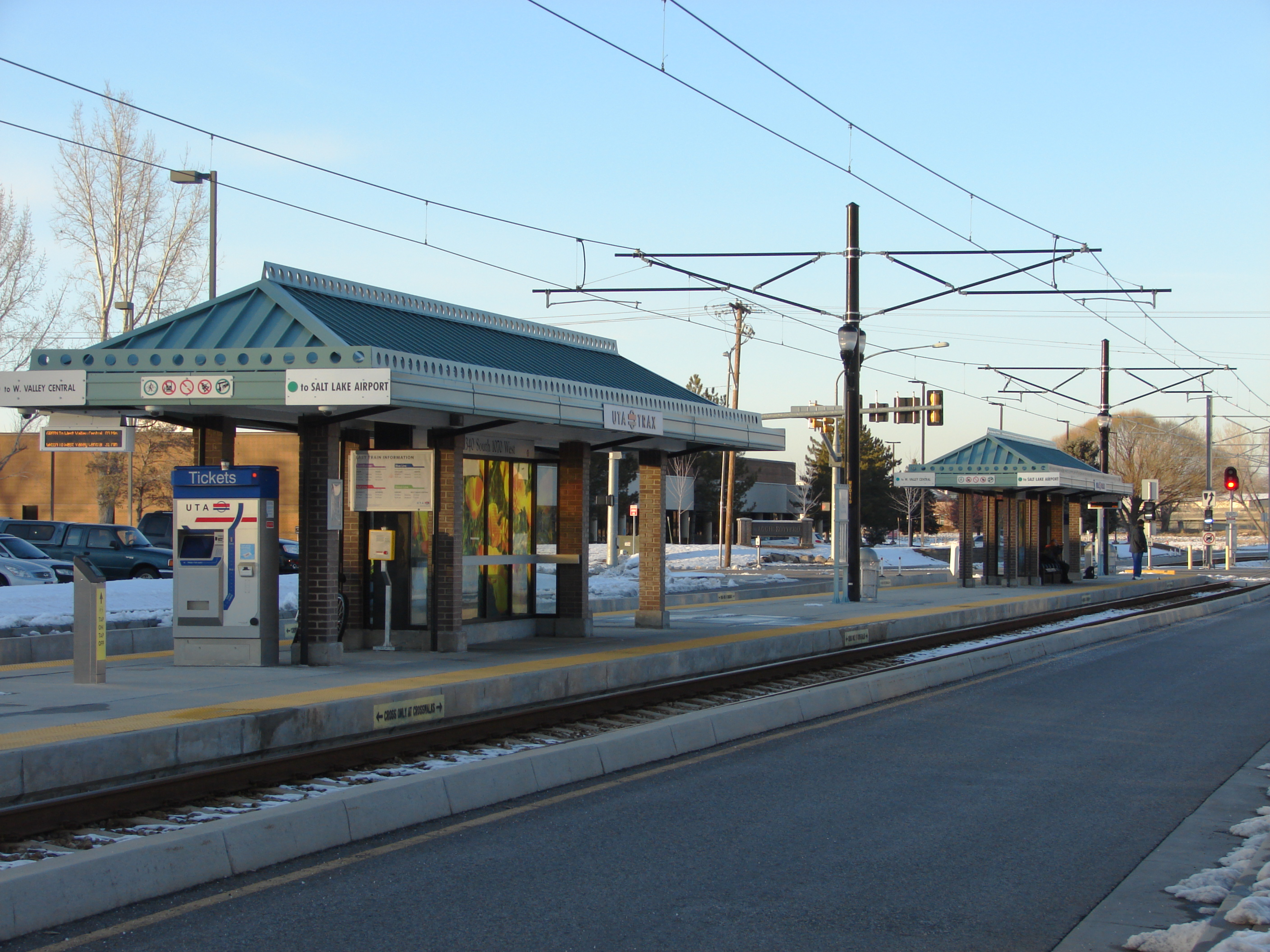
- River Trail station platform

General information
- Location: 2340 South 1070 West (Winston Street); West Valley City, Utah; United States
- Coordinates: 40.721693°N 111.923816°W
- Owner: Utah Transit Authority (UTA)
- Platforms: 1 island platform
- Tracks: 2

Construction
- Structure type: At-grade
- Parking: 100 spaces
- Accessible: Yes

History
- Opened: August 7, 2011; 15 years ago

Services
Preceding station	Utah Transit Authority	Following station
Central Pointe toward Airport	Green Line	Redwood Junction toward West Valley Central
Location

River Trail station is a light rail station in West Valley City, Utah, in the United States, served by the Green Line of the Utah Transit Authority's (UTA) TRAX light rail system. The Green Line provides service from the Salt Lake City International Airport to West Valley City (via Downtown Salt Lake City).

== Description ==
The station is located at 2340 South 1070 West (Winston Street) with its island platform being situated in the middle of that street. The station has easy access from the 21st South Freeway and Redwood Road (1700 West/SR-68) by heading east on 2320 North, but there is no access to the station from the east. The station is located in the middle of a low-density business park, just west of the Jordan River. The surrounding business park is isolated by the 21st South Freeway to the north and unbridged floodplains of the Jordan River to the south and east (though pedestrians and bicyclists can travel north or south on the namesake of the station, the Jordan River Parkway trail). UTA indicates the station has 100 free Park and Ride spaces available. However, no parking is allowed on Sundays at this station. The station opened 7 August 2011 as part of the West Valley extension of the Green Line and is operated by the Utah Transit Authority.
