= Power station (Utah Transit Authority) =

Light rail station in Salt Lake City, Utah, United States

Power
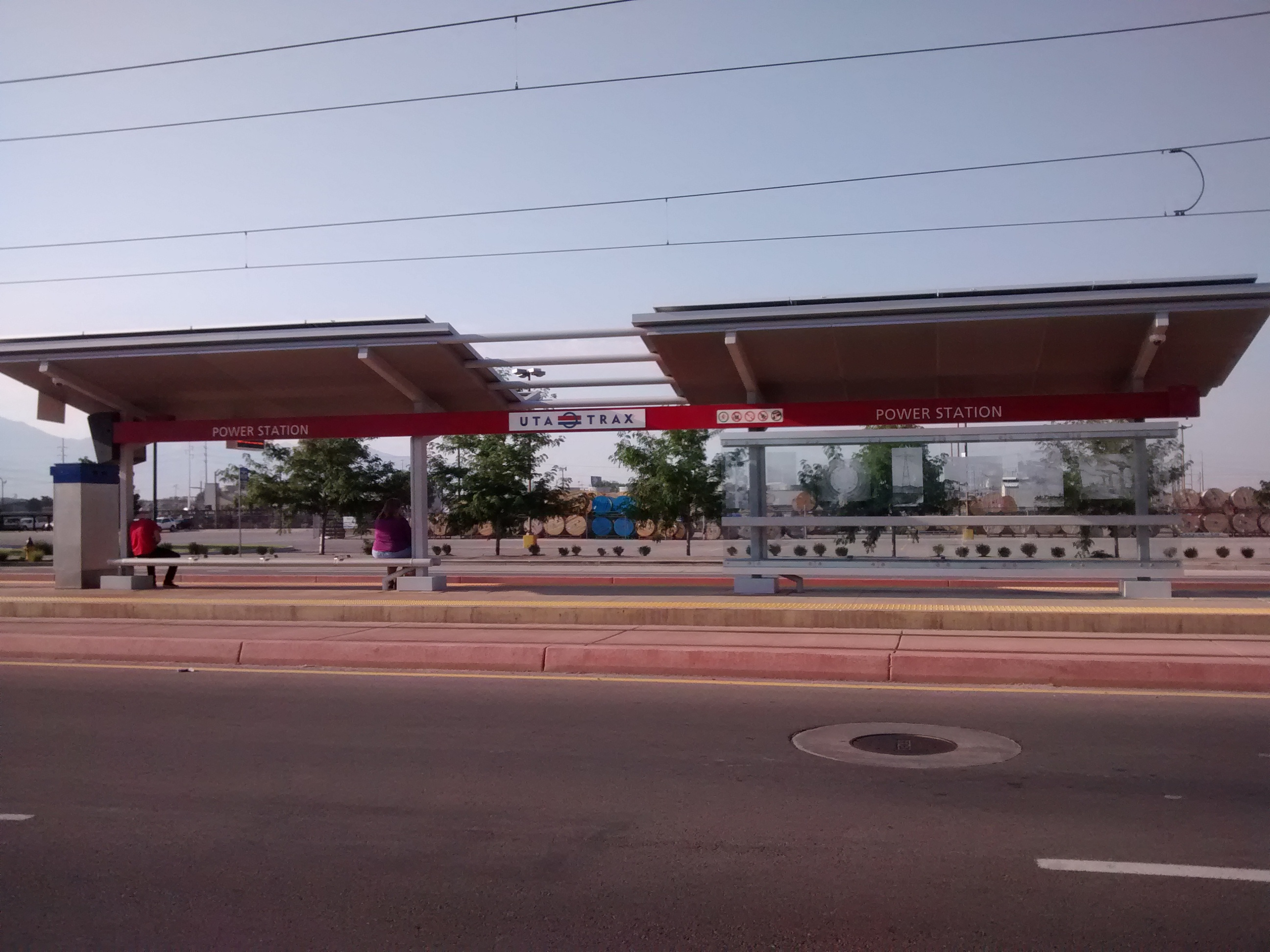
- Power station platform as seen from the north

General information
- Location: 1480 W North Temple; Salt Lake City, Utah; United States
- Coordinates: 40°46′17.5″N 111°56′02″W
- Owner: Utah Transit Authority (UTA)
- Platforms: 1 island platform
- Connections: UTA: 1, 205, 451, F453, 551, On Demand Salt Lake City Westside

Construction
- Structure type: At-grade
- Accessible: Yes

History
- Opened: April 14, 2013; 13 years ago

Services
Preceding station	Utah Transit Authority	Following station
1940 West North Temple toward Airport	Green Line	Fairpark toward West Valley Central
Proposed services
Preceding station	Utah Transit Authority	Following station
1940 West North Temple toward Airport	Blue Line	Fairpark toward Draper Town Center
1940 West North Temple toward Airport	Orange Line	Fairpark toward Arapeen
Location

Power station is a light rail station in Salt Lake City, Utah, served by the Green Line of the Utah Transit Authority's (UTA) TRAX system. The Green Line provides service from the Salt Lake City International Airport to West Valley City (via Downtown Salt Lake City), and connects with the rest of the TRAX system, as well as UTA's FrontRunner commuter rail and S Line streetcar.

== Description ==
The station is located at 1480 West North Temple Street, with the island platform in the median of the street. The Rocky Mountain Power facility is located just south of the station. Unlike many TRAX stations, Power does not have a Park and Ride lot. Like many other UTA stations, this station has artwork included in its design. The artwork for the Power station includes benches designed to resemble wind turbines. The combined work is called The Power Station and was designed by Darl Thomas of Salt Lake City. The station is part of a railway right of way that was created specifically for the Green Line. The station opened on April 14, 2013, and is operated by the Utah Transit Authority. It is also one of four TRAX stations (all of which are located at the north end of the Green Line) that is powered by solar panels located on top of the station's canopy through a project which was initially funded in part by Rocky Mountain Power.
