= Redwood Junction station =

Light rail station in West Valley City, Utah, United States

Redwood Junction
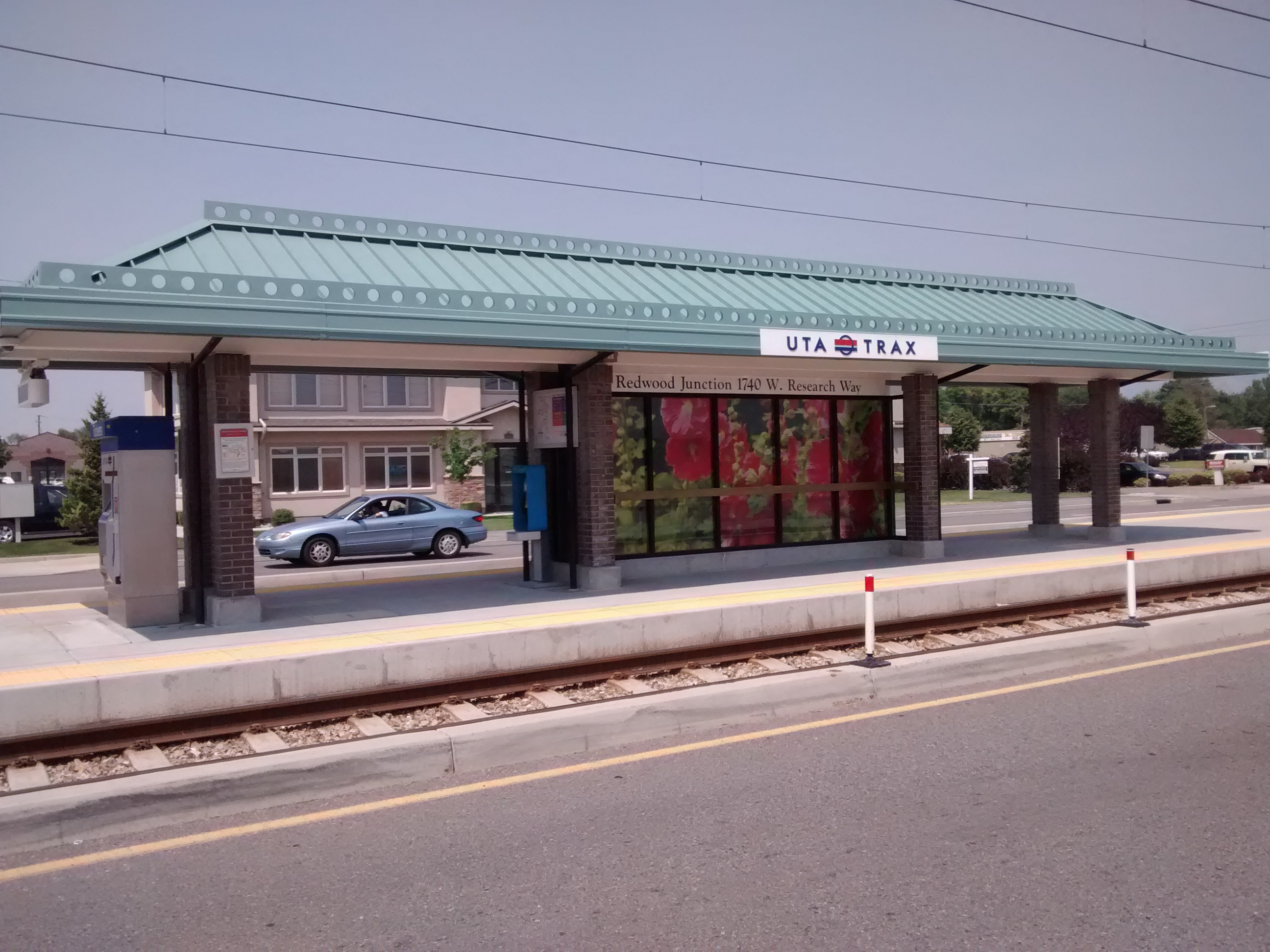
- Redwood Junction station platform

General information
- Location: 1740 West Research Way; West Valley City, Utah; United States
- Coordinates: 40.711091°N 111.940362°W
- Owner: Utah Transit Authority (UTA)
- Platforms: 1 island platform
- Tracks: 2
- Connections: UTA: 217

Construction
- Structure type: At-grade
- Parking: 6–9 spaces
- Accessible: Yes

History
- Opened: August 7, 2011; 15 years ago

Services
Preceding station	Utah Transit Authority	Following station
River Trail toward Airport	Green Line	Decker Lake toward West Valley Central
Location

Redwood Junction station is a light rail station in West Valley City, Utah, United States, served by the Green Line of the Utah Transit Authority's (UTA) TRAX light rail system. The Green Line provides service from the Salt Lake International Airport to West Valley City (via Downtown Salt Lake City).

== Description ==
The station is located at 1740 West Research Way (2770 South) with its island platform being situated in the middle of that street. Since the station is located immediately west of Redwood Road (1700 West/SR-68) there is easy access to the station from that road. The station is on the eastern edge of the Decker Lake Business Park. Research Way does not continue east of Redwood Road; instead a segment of the Crosstown Trail parallels the south side of the Green Line tracks (and the stream draining Decker Lake) to provide a connection to the Redwood Nature Area and the Jordan River Parkway for pedestrians and bicyclists. The area had rail service in the early 20th century provided by the Salt Lake and Utah Railroad, though the Green Line uses a different route. UTA indicates the station has 6–9 free Park and Ride spaces available. The station opened 7 August 2011 as part of the West Valley extension of the Green Line and is operated by the Utah Transit Authority.
