= North Temple station =

Light rail and commuter rail station in Salt Lake City, Utah, United States

North Temple North Temple Bridge/Guadalupe
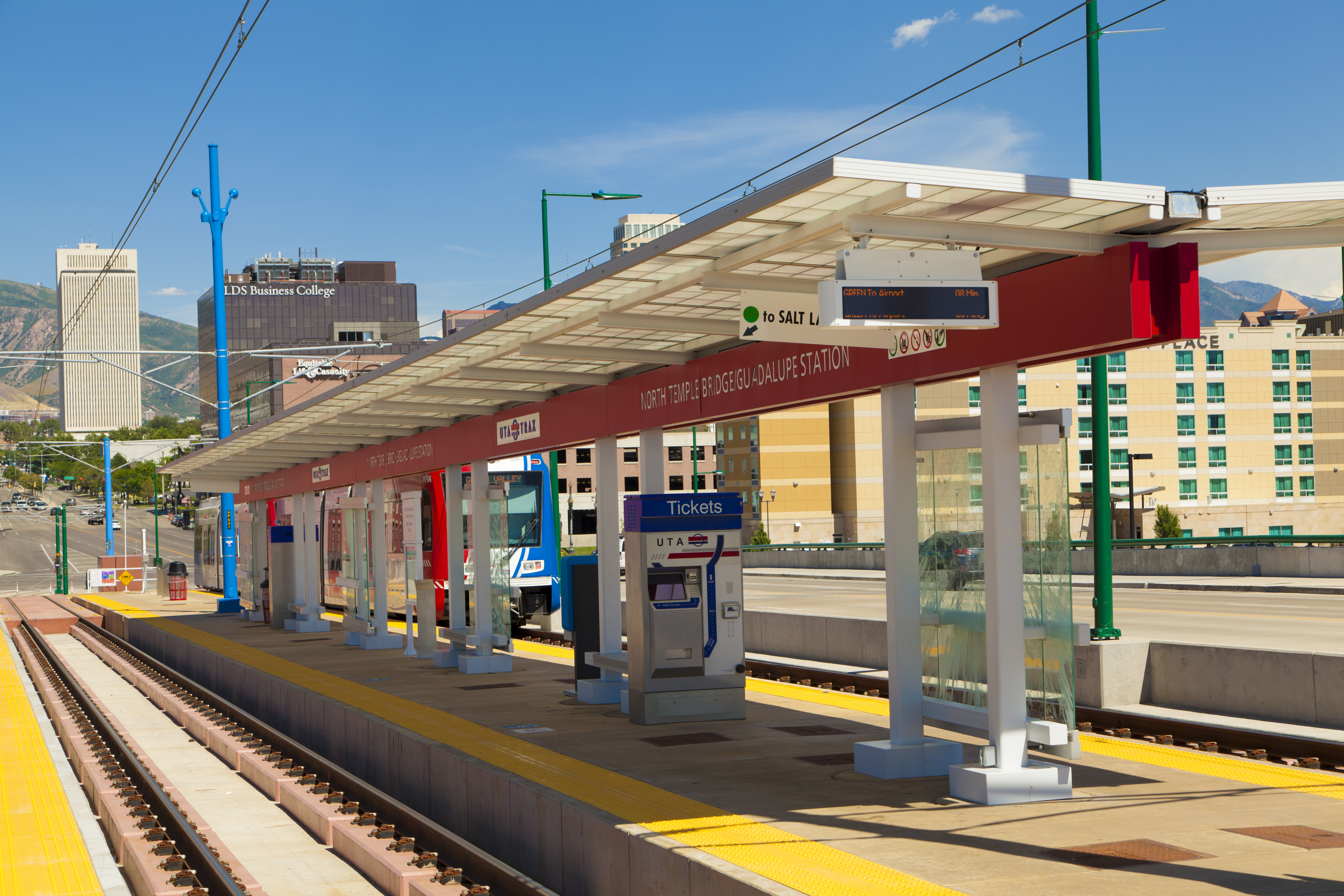
- Shelter and platform at the North Temple Bridge/Guadalupe station, August 2013

General information
- Location: TRAX: 500 W North Temple; FrontRunner: 480 West 200 North; Salt Lake City, Utah; United States
- Coordinates: 40.772017°N 111.905000°W
- Owner: Utah Transit Authority (UTA)
- Platforms: 1 island platform and 1 side platform (TRAX); 1 island platform (FrontRunner)
- Tracks: 2 (TRAX); 2 (FrontRunner)
- Connections: FrontRunner

Construction
- Structure type: Elevated (TRAX); At-grade (FrontRunner)
- Parking: None
- Accessible: Yes

History
- Opened: December 10, 2012; 13 years ago

Services
Preceding station	Utah Transit Authority	Following station
Jackson/Euclid toward Ogden Central	FrontRunner	Arena toward Provo Central
Woods Cross toward Airport	Green Line	Salt Lake Central toward West Valley Central
Proposed services
Preceding station	Utah Transit Authority	Following station
Jackson/Euclid toward Airport	Blue Line	Arena toward Draper Town Center
Jackson/Euclid toward Airport	Orange Line	Planetarium toward Arapeen
Location

North Temple station (signed as North Temple Bridge/Guadalupe station for the TRAX Green Line) is a light rail and commuter rail station in Salt Lake City, Utah, United States, that is served by the TRAX light rail system's Green Line and by FrontRunner, Utah Transit Authority's (UTA) commuter rail train that operates along the Wasatch Front with service from Ogden in central Weber County through Davis County, Salt Lake City, and Salt Lake County to Provo in central Utah County. The Green Line provides service from the Salt Lake City International Airport to West Valley City (via Downtown Salt Lake City) and connects with the rest of the TRAX system and UTA's S Line streetcar. On Demand Salt Lake City Westside.

== Description ==
There is no direct vehicle access to the North Temple Bridge/Guadalupe station (as there is no stopping allowed on the North Temple Street Viaduct), but pedestrians can use stairs or escalators that connect the north side of the North Temple Street Viaduct with the south end of North Temple station. That station can be accessed from North 490 West at 200 North on the east and North 500 West on the south, but is also accessible from the west at West 300 North [on the north]. Pedestrians can also access the station from either end of the North Temple Street Viaduct at 400 West or 600 West. Although the station's platform is listed as "at grade", the station is still considered a flying junction since the TRAX tracks pass over the FrontRunner and Union Pacific tracks. South of the station is The Gateway, including the former Union Pacific Depot. North Temple station is located within the FrontRunner quiet zone, so trains do not routinely sound their horns when approaching public crossings within this corridor.

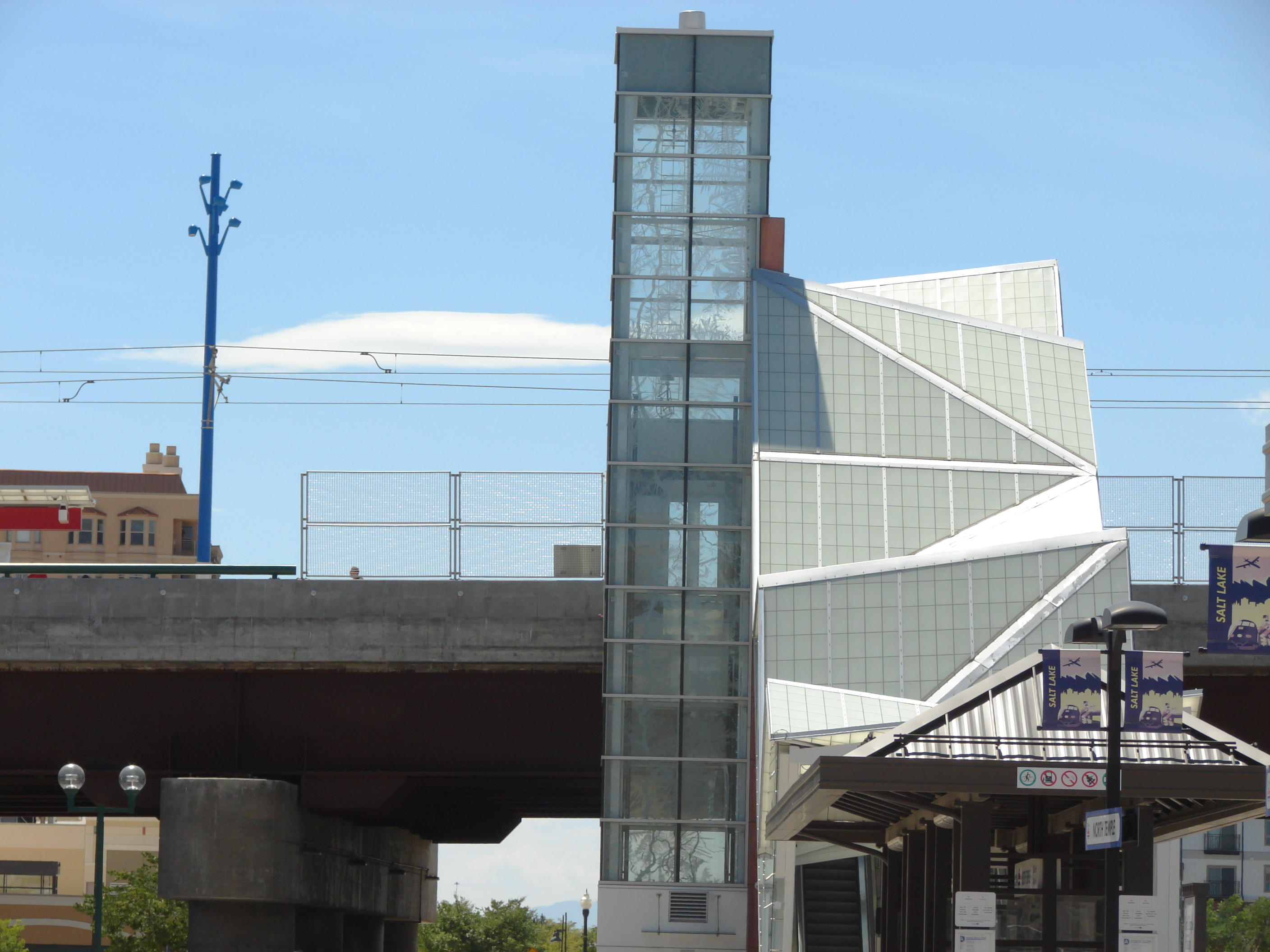
South at Crystal Light from North Temple station, August 2015

North Temple Bridge/Guadalupe station is part of the TRAX Airport extension and is also part of a railway right of way that was created specifically for the Green Line. The station, along with the rest of the Airport extension, opened on April 14, 2013. North Temple station is an infill station created to connect the Green Line to the FrontRunner after the Green Line was routed away from Salt Lake Central as part of the TRAX Airport Extension. Like many other UTA stations, this station has artwork included in its design. The artwork for both the North Temple Bridge/Guadalupe and the North Temple stations is the stairway and elevator connecting the two stations. The roof of the stairway and sides of the elevator shaft were designed to have the appearance of a crystal. It is called Crystal Light and was designed by Catherine Widgery of Cambridge, Massachusetts. Although not part of FrontRunner South, the North Temple station opened on the same date as that extension, December 10, 2012.
