= 1940 West North Temple station =

Light rail station in Salt Lake City, Utah, United States

1940 W. North Temple
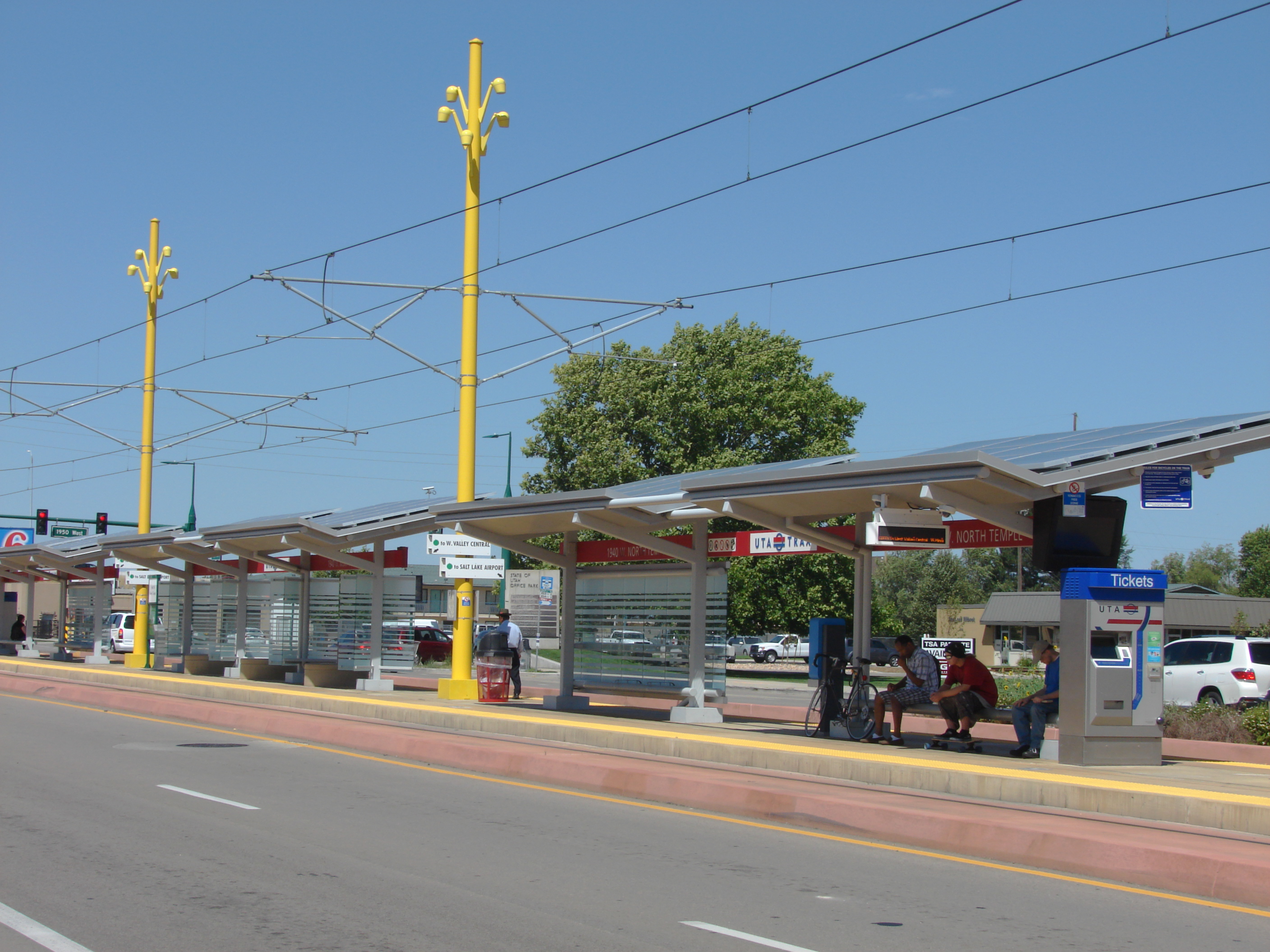
- 1940 West North Temple station platform

General information
- Location: 1940 W North Temple; Salt Lake City, Utah; United States
- Coordinates: 40°46′17.5″N 111°56′46″W
- Owner: Utah Transit Authority (UTA)
- Platforms: 1 island platform
- Connections: UTA: 217, 451, F453, 551, On Demand Salt Lake City Westside

Construction
- Structure type: At-grade
- Accessible: Yes

History
- Opened: April 14, 2013; 13 years ago

Services
Preceding station	Utah Transit Authority	Following station
Airport Terminus	Green Line	Power toward West Valley Central
Proposed services
Preceding station	Utah Transit Authority	Following station
Airport Terminus	Blue Line	Power toward Draper Town Center
Airport Terminus	Orange Line	Power toward Arapeen
Location

1940 West North Temple station is a light rail station in Salt Lake City, Utah serviced by the Green Line of the Utah Transit Authority's (UTA) TRAX system. The Green Line provides service from the Salt Lake City International Airport to West Valley City (via Downtown Salt Lake City), and connects with the rest of the TRAX system, as well as UTA's FrontRunner commuter rail and S Line streetcar.

== Description ==
As the station's name indicates, it is located at 1940 West North Temple, with the island platform in the median of the street. (It is one of only small number of TRAX stations that do not have designated name other than its approximate address.) Unlike many TRAX stations, 1940 West North Temple does not have a Park and Ride lot. Like many other UTA stations, this station has art work included in its design. The art work for the 1940 W North Temple station was designed to "mirror the wetlands and wildlife that exist throughout the Salt Lake Valley". It is called Spatial Perception and was designed by Shawn Porter of Salt Lake City. The station is part of a railway right of way that was created specifically for the Green Line. The station opened on April 14, 2013, and is operated by the Utah Transit Authority. It is also one of four TRAX stations (all of which are located the north end of the Green Line) that is powered by solar panels located on top of the station's canopy through a project which was initially funded in part by Rocky Mountain Power.

All of UTA's TRAX and FrontRunner trains and stations, streetcars and streetcar stops, and all fixed route buses are compliant with Americans with Disabilities Act and are therefore accessible to those with disabilities. Signage at the stations, on the passenger platforms, and on the trains clearly indicate accessibility options. In accordance with the Utah Clean Air Act and UTA ordinance, "smoking is prohibited on UTA vehicles as well as UTA bus stops, TRAX stations, and FrontRunner stations".
