= Decker Lake station =

Light rail station in West Valley, Utah, United States

Decker Lake
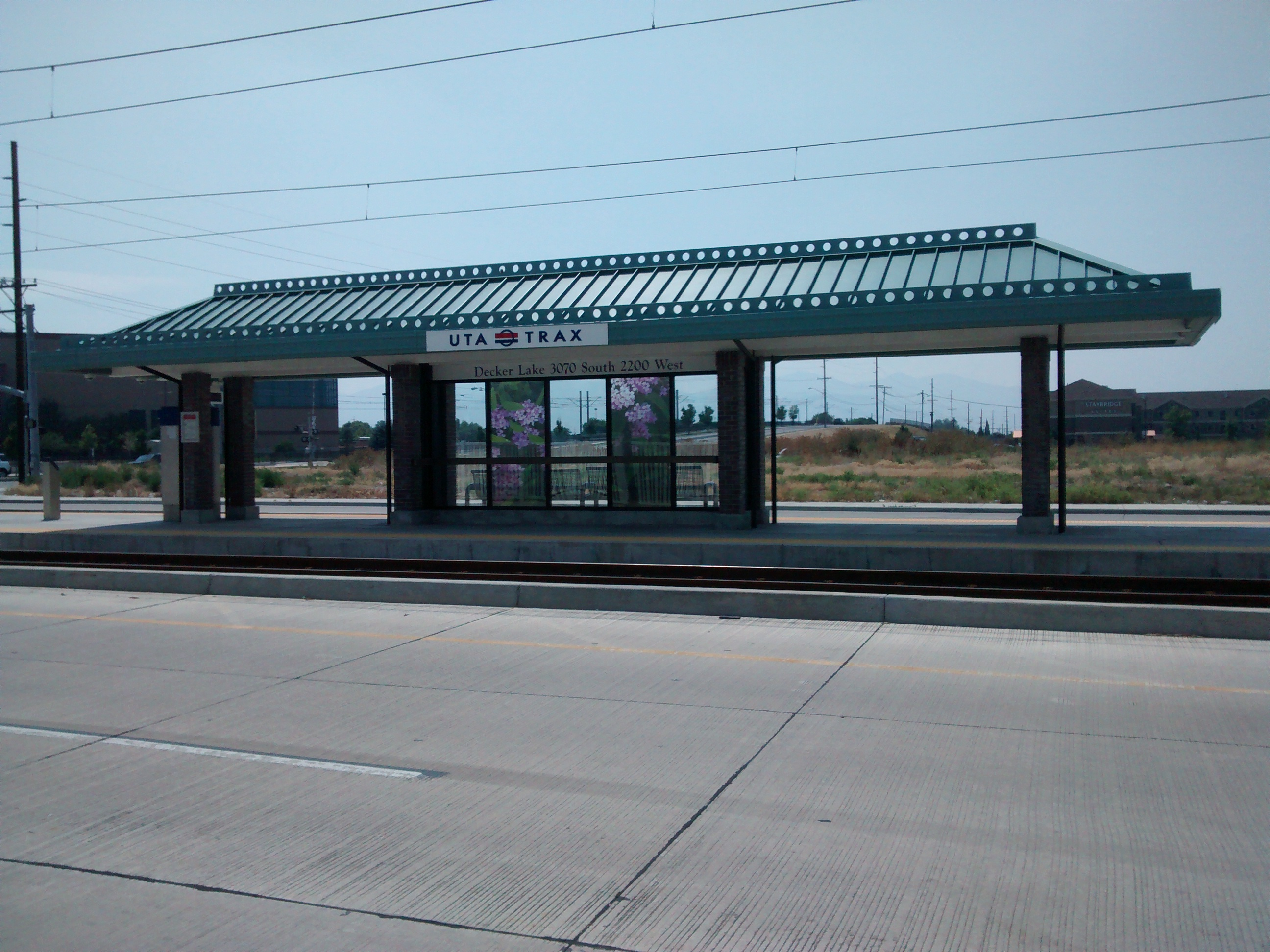
- Decker Lake station platform

General information
- Location: 3070 South 2200 West; West Valley City, Utah; United States
- Coordinates: 40.704656°N 111.948688°W
- Owner: Utah Transit Authority (UTA)
- Platforms: 1 island platform
- Tracks: 2

Construction
- Structure type: At-grade
- Parking: 750 spaces
- Accessible: Yes

History
- Opened: August 7, 2011; 15 years ago

Services
Preceding station	Utah Transit Authority	Following station
Redwood Junction toward Airport	Green Line	West Valley Central Terminus
Location

Decker Lake station is a light rail station in West Valley City, Utah, served by the Green Line of the Utah Transit Authority's (UTA) TRAX light rail system. The Green Line provides service from the Salt Lake International Airport to West Valley City (via Downtown Salt Lake City).

== Description ==
The station is located at 3070 South 2200 West (Decker Lake Drive) with its island platform being situated in the middle of that street. The station has easy access from the 3100 South cross street. Although fairly near Interstate 215, the nearest interchange for I-215 is at 3500 South (SR-171). The station is just northeast of the Maverik Center (formerly the E-Center). The station has a free Park and Ride lot with total of about 750 parking spaces available. The station opened 7 August 2011 as part of the West Valley extension of the Green Line and is operated by the Utah Transit Authority. The station has a parking lot (one of only two on the West Valley spur) and in 2019 it served as the only lot while the parking lot at West Valley Central was being replaced by a parking structure.
