= Ruby Chacon =

American artist

Ruby Chacon (born 1971) is an American muralist and self-proclaimed "Utahana", artist, using art as a medium to express her dual identity as both a Utah native and a Chicana.

== Biography ==
Ruby Chacon was born in 1971 in Salt Lake City, Utah where she continued to reside for the majority of her life, dedicating her artistic career to community engagement through the arts and artivism. Chacon is an artist, a mother, a daughter, and a familiar face in the community, engaging actively in community events and in her public display of murals. Chacon works with several mediums, however she is best known for her work with murals. Chacon's work has been displayed across Utah and internationally.

Chacon is amongst the youngest of six children, but the first to have graduated from high school and pursue a higher education. Chacon attained her Bachelors of Fine Arts from the University of Utah. Her mother was a hospital cleaner who grew up on the west side of Utah, or as what is known as the “Brown side,” and her father began his career in mining in Montecillo but later moved to the east side to start his family.

Although Chacon was aware of her heritage, she was not very familiar with her Mexican identity, and when questioning her grandfather about it, he replied only with reminding her she was from Utah. Chacon eventually came to intertwine both identities under the self proclaimed label Utahana, which later became a factor in her work.

Chacon lived in a working-class family, where she recalls sleeping in the living room, because her house was not large enough to accommodate everyone. Many members of her family had artistic ties themselves, such as her uncle Covito, who as a painter and would allow Chacon to be creative by drawing on the walls. Chacon's ancestry traces back to Pueblo Indians who speak the Tewa language and her Spanish side lays stake to claim in Utah for hundreds of years. After the death of her nephew Orlando Chacon, who was murdered by her sister's boyfriend, Chacon became more interested in painting her own family as a direct rejection of how the media attempted to portray them.

== Artwork ==
Ruby Chacon is a painter, though not limited to any particular medium; her artwork consists of murals and canvas paintings. Her murals are displayed all throughout Utah, Wyoming, California, and abroad in Thailand and Morocco. Earlier in her life, Chacon wanted to pursue a career in teaching drawing classes. However Chacon was interested in depicting lowriders and the Chicano zoot suit style which was frowned upon. Chacon's canvas paintings are mostly oil paintings, although she also uses acrylics. All of her murals are done in acrylic to maintain lower production costs. She does not like to frame her canvas work because she believes that those who purchase her work will likely reframe the piece, making her extra effort redundant. She is said to sign her name in red after her name, Ruby. Chacon considers her art to be not unlike typical Utah art because although her style veers from the traditionalist landscape artwork associated with Utah, Chacon depicts real people of Utah. Chacon seeks to humanize through her work, painting people of her direct family but giving them a humanness others can easily relate to.

Chacon has been featured in many shows, both local to Utah and tours beyond, and has been presented with many awards for her work. She has been featured at the Hispanic Festival, Salt Lake City Airport, University of Utah Medical Center, Westminster College, Kimball Art Center in Park City, Art Access Gallery. Her murals have been displayed publicly at Horizonte, 1300 South Main; 500 North and 600 West; Northwest Multipurpose Center; Catholic Community Services, 200 South 745 East as well as in other states. Her work has also appeared on the cover of the University Neighborhood partners and at the TRAX station of North Temple and 900 West in Salt Lake. In 2007, she received the Mayor's award for her role with visual art and in 2021 she will receive the mayor's award again but this time for her collective, MICA. Chacon's work has also been featured on book covers such as “Transforming Educational Pathways for Chicano/a Students” by author Dolores Delgado, and granted awards Utah Governor's Mansion Award for visual arts, Humanitarian Award as well as Distinguished Alumni at the Salt Lake Community College, and was named one of Utah's 15 most influential artists.

== Notable art / exhibitions ==
- SLS mural displayed at the School of Leadership Studies at Gonzaga University as part of a participatory arts collective with other educators.
- Artwork displayed in the Arte Latino exhibition at the Kimball Center in Utah
- Her piece Undocumented, was featured in the Constructing Self: Thirty Self-Portraits exhibit as part of the 30th Anniversary Utah Art Festival
- Catholic Community Service Outdoor Mural, 2007, located at 745 E. 300 South
- Cihuacoatl and Golden Rule Outdoor Murals 500 N 600 W Salt Lake City, UT Public Art Commissioned by UAC, Neighborworks and Department of Education

== Activism / artivism ==
Chacon's identity as a "Utahana" serves as a focal point for not only her art work but her work in the community as well. Chacon speaks of the struggles of being first-generation student, and representing an identity that is so commonly misrepresented. Chacon works directly with youth in the community providing a space to heal through art and community. Much of Chacon's public murals in Utah draw questions of whether they belong in Utah as a representation of the community, but it is this same critique that displays Chacon's reason for painting: to make visible the long-term presence of Latinx people in the United States beyond the history taught in typical discourses. As a result, she opened a venue called Mestizo which would combine a coffee house along with a place for Chicanos to commune and speak of their trauma. However, in 2002 Chacon's endeavor fell short lacking a business plan. Chacon and her husband Terry went on to found the nonprofit Mestizo Institute for Culture and Arts (MICA). The building had a coffee shop, art gallery and open space for community members to gather.

Chacon also works alongside Bad Dog Rediscovers America and other programs that fund, and introduce art to Latino youth. Chacon has also visited juvenile intervention centers and female units to provide art as a form of healing and expressing oneself. Chacon guided four teens for a project funded by Bad Dog, in which they created a design for a mural and painted it together. During her time at the University of Utah, Chacon discovered the power of art as a form of education as well as activism at which point she knew she had to redefine how the Latino experience was being portrayed through art.
