= Utah State Fair =

Coordinates: 40°46′21.2″N 111°55′8.8″W

- Genre: State fair
- Date: 10–20 September 2026
- Frequency: Annually, begins the Thursday after Labor Day
- Locations: 155 North 1000 West; Salt Lake City, Utah; United States
- Years active: 1856–1916, 1919–1941, since 1945
- Website: www.utahstatefair.com

The Utah State Fair is held at the Utah State Fairpark in Salt Lake City, Utah, United States. The fairgrounds are listed on the National Register of Historic Places. The fair takes place each year starting on the first Thursday after Labor Day and lasts for 11 days.

== Entertainment ==
Every year the State Fair hosts musical guests and other entertainers during the fair. From the grandstand line-up to the demolition derby, truck pull and PRCA rodeo. The fair offers mostly free entertainment with a few of the bigger concerts at a price.

=== Grandstand entertainment ===
The fair's grandstand represents the best in entertainment for the fair. The 2013 grandstand concert line-up included top performers: Plain White T's, Amy Grant, American Pickers, Love and Theft, Bridgit Mendler, 38 Special, Caleb Chapman's Crescent Superband with special guest Poncho Sanchez, The Texaco Country Showdown State Finals, Kahuna Beach Party and Ramón Ayala. The 2019 edition will see big names like Old Dominion, Prince Royce, and Foreigner. Most shows are free and only need a seating ticket.

=== Grounds entertainment ===
Free with the gate admission the State Fair has entertainment on the grounds. This year the entertainment will feature: Paul Bunyan Lumberjack Show, The Great American Duck Race, Wizards Challenge, Randy Cabral, Freddy Fusion and Lokalgrown.

=== Gazebo entertainment ===
The gazebo on the fairgrounds is also home to free entertainment. The gazebo will host entertainment from: Randy Cabral and Freddy Fusion Science Magic Show (Sept. 5th-15th), Cross Strung (Sept. 5th), County Red (Sept. 6th), Eric Dodge (Sept. 7th), The Hollering Pines (Sept. 8th), The Linfords (Sept. 9), Kindle Creek (Sept. 10) and Lokalgrown (Sept. 11th-16th).

== Exhibits ==
Living Arts,4-H Food and Clothing, Agriculture, Creative Arts, Fine Arts, Floriculture, Home Arts, Indoor Cook-offs, Outdoor Cook-offs, Photography, Livestock, Jr. Livestock, Beef Cattle, Dairy Cattle, Goats, Poultry, Rabbits, Sheep and Swine.

== Food ==
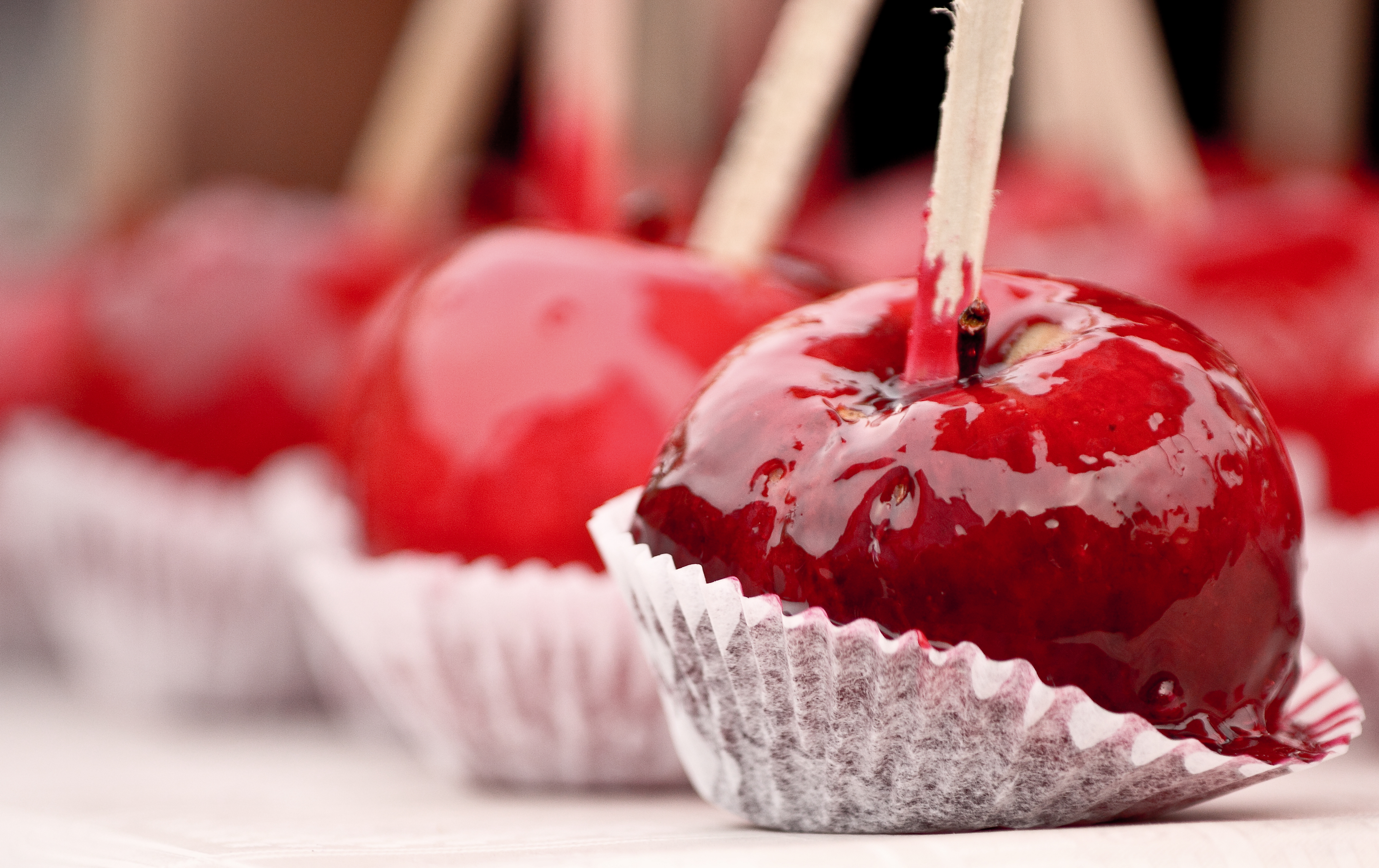
Candy apples in a row

Food options at the Fair vary from traditional fair corn dogs, Navajo tacos to sweet funnel cakes.

== Rules and regulations ==
Fairgrounds don't allow any pets besides assistance animals with the written approval. Visitors cannot bring any vehicles like bicycles, motorcycles, roller-skates, roller blades, scooters, skateboards or golf carts without written permission from the Fairpark management. Outside food is permitted, but no alcohol may be brought to the fairgrounds. To keep the atmosphere friendly and safe for everyone, organizers reserve the right to remove from the Fair area any person who uses abusive language or behavior, wears offensive clothing, and is strongly intoxicated. The Fair authorities may also remove any person conducting private business or distributing advertising material without an authorized Exhibit Space Lease Agreement. Patrons shall not litter the territory of the Fairpark and damage the buildings or grounds and shall adhere to the official hours of the Fair.

== History of Utah ==
=== Settlement of Utah ===
During the 1700 and early 1800s, trappers and other frontiersmen passed through the Salt Lake Valley of what is today Utah. With the high rugged Rocky Mountains on the east and miles of unfriendly, hot, dry desert and salt flats on the west, most of these early explorers and settlers found the climate and land an inhospitable environment in which to settle.

The Church of Jesus Christ of Latter-day Saints (LDS Church) had been established in 1830 by Joseph Smith in New York. Due to religious persecution, the group moved further and further west, yearning for a land to settle in which they could practice their religion. Following the murder of Joseph Smith in Nauvoo, Illinois, Brigham Young lead the Mormon pioneers across the plains and west of the United States borders where they could live with religious freedom and establish their homes. The Salt Lake Valley met their desires.

In July, 1847, the first pioneers reached the Salt Lake Valley. Although the land poised many challenges, this was a choice situation for the pioneers, even though most were from the fertile eastern states.

== History of the fair ==
=== Origin of the fair ===
Due to the isolation of the territory, for the pioneers to survive it was imperative that they become self-sufficient and provide all of their necessities. Thus, the major goal of agricultural policy in pioneer Utah was complete self-sufficiency and independence.

The major instrument for implementing this policy was the Deseret Agricultural and Manufacturing (D.A.M) Society, incorporated by an act of Territorial Legislature on January 17, 1856.

The D.A.M. Society staff consisted of six men who were elected in the first instance by the joint vote of the State Legislative Assembly. These men of foresight and vision gave their loyal service without any compensation other than the joy of public service. Despite its charter as an agent of the territorial government, the Society's motive force and institutional goals and staffs were provided by the LDS Church and for many years the president of the Society, and the members of its board of directors, were selected or approved by Brigham Young. The first President of the Society was The Presiding Bishop of the LDS Church, Edward Hunter who served from 1856 until 1863.

In the LDS Church General Conference, a semi-annual meeting of the LDS Church, following the incorporation of the Society; an entire session was devoted to a reading of the act of an "agricultural sermon" explaining the Society's plans and purpose to "promote the arts of domestic industry and to encourage the production of articles from the native elements in Utah Territory." As one way of doing this, the Society sponsored an annual exposition in Salt Lake City, "The Deseret Fair."

=== The First Fair ===
Only nine years after the 1847 arrival of the Mormon pioneers to the Salt Lake Valley, the Deseret Agricultural and Manufacturing Society organized the first Fair and continued to organize and sponsor the Fairs until 1907.

The first fair, then called "The Deseret Fair," was held October 2–4, 1856 in the building known as the "Deseret Store and Tithing Office," in downtown Salt Lake City across the street from where the Salt Lake City Utah LDS Temple was to be built. Later in 1909 the Deseret Store and Tithing Office (a bishop's storehouse) and the Deseret News printing plant were moved to accommodate the construction of the Hotel Utah, which is now the Joseph Smith Building.

The basement of the Deseret Store, displayed agriculture products including, "large hens from Land's End England." The handicraft products were displayed on the first floor, including, "a very handsome bridle, saddle and buckskin suit" and on the second floor were fruits of the orchard and garden, and household items.

Pride in excellence of exhibits must have been the chief reward of the early exhibitors for most of the cash awards were from .50 to $3. And "diplomas" were the only prizes awarded in many instances.

Among the winners for exhibits are names prominent in Utah history, including Brigham Young, who was the winner of $25 for "Best Stallion" and won first prize for the "Best celery exhibit." Other prizes include: $10 for best cow, $25 for the best fenced and cultivated farm. Diplomas were the only awards for the best shepherd dog, good penmanship and the best ten pounds of native sugar. Other items displayed were cheese, butter, table cutlery, a sword and scabbard, bushels of cocoons, specimens of raw silk and bales of cotton.

Although there isn't any mention of a carnival atmosphere such as the current midway rides, arena events, or games; it is recorded that on the second day of the Fair a "spirited plowing match came off, in one of the governor's fields adjacent to the city."

=== The early years ===
To help finance the early fairs, life memberships were sold. The fee for membership was nominal, but provided the meager funds required and generated interest in the fair. During the membership drive that followed the 1856 LDS Church General Conference, a message was sent to all the church bishops appointing them and their councilors to be agents of the Society and authorizing them to collect two dollars in dues from each church member. For a number of years, teams of members made annual visits to each ward and stake to plead the cause of the Society and advertise the fair.

The annual fairs sponsored by the Society also had religious significance. Most of them were invariably held to coincide with the October LDS General Conference, thus making the annual fall an excursion to serve, "both God and Mammon." In addition, early Fairs were held on church owned properties.

The diplomas awarded for prize exhibits in each field contained the religious symbol, the "All-seeing Eye," with the inscription, "Holiness to the Lord." The Territorial emblem, the beehive, was also on the awards with a background consisting of a view of the Salt Lake Temple as it would look when completed.

Since early Utah residents were geographically isolated from manufacturing centers on the United States East and West coasts, they relied upon the Society and the annual exposition to learn new and better methods of farming and manufacturing.

The D.A.M. Society was not only the origin of the present Utah State Fair board, but it instituted branches in various counties, which are regarded as forerunners of the county fairs held throughout the State today. Expositions were not the only concern of the Society. The members listed the mineral resources and gathered agricultural statistics for the territory, worked on reclamation projects that attracted the attention of the entire civilized world, and encouraged progress in the arts and sciences. The Society was also responsible for establishing the first experimental garden west of the Mississippi, the Deseret Gardens, located at the mouth of Emigration Canyon. The main purpose of the Gardens was the production of pure seed for distribution to the various settlements of the Territory.

The Society's board of directors was by no means provincial in their aims or methods of promotion. In 1864 a dispatch was sent to San Francisco for garden seeds and fruit trees for the Deseret Gardens. It was for the growth of the Territorial industry that the Society imported seeds, trees, and plants from as far away as Batavia, Japan, and other foreign countries. The Society was also the designated recipient of seeds and plants distributed by the United States Patent Office and later the United States Department of Agriculture.

The Society's president was directed to appoint an agent for the Territory to receive and dispose of titles to the public lands apportioned to the Territory by Morrill Act of 1862, for the purpose of establishing an agricultural college and experiment station. The Territory made regular apportioned to the Society for a variety of purposes, including the subsidizing of certain industries, such as wool growing and sent a representative as early as 1869 to the Eastern States to select breeds of sheep for importation. The Society also secured appropriations for the importation of purebred, choice breeds of cattle.

=== The fair ===
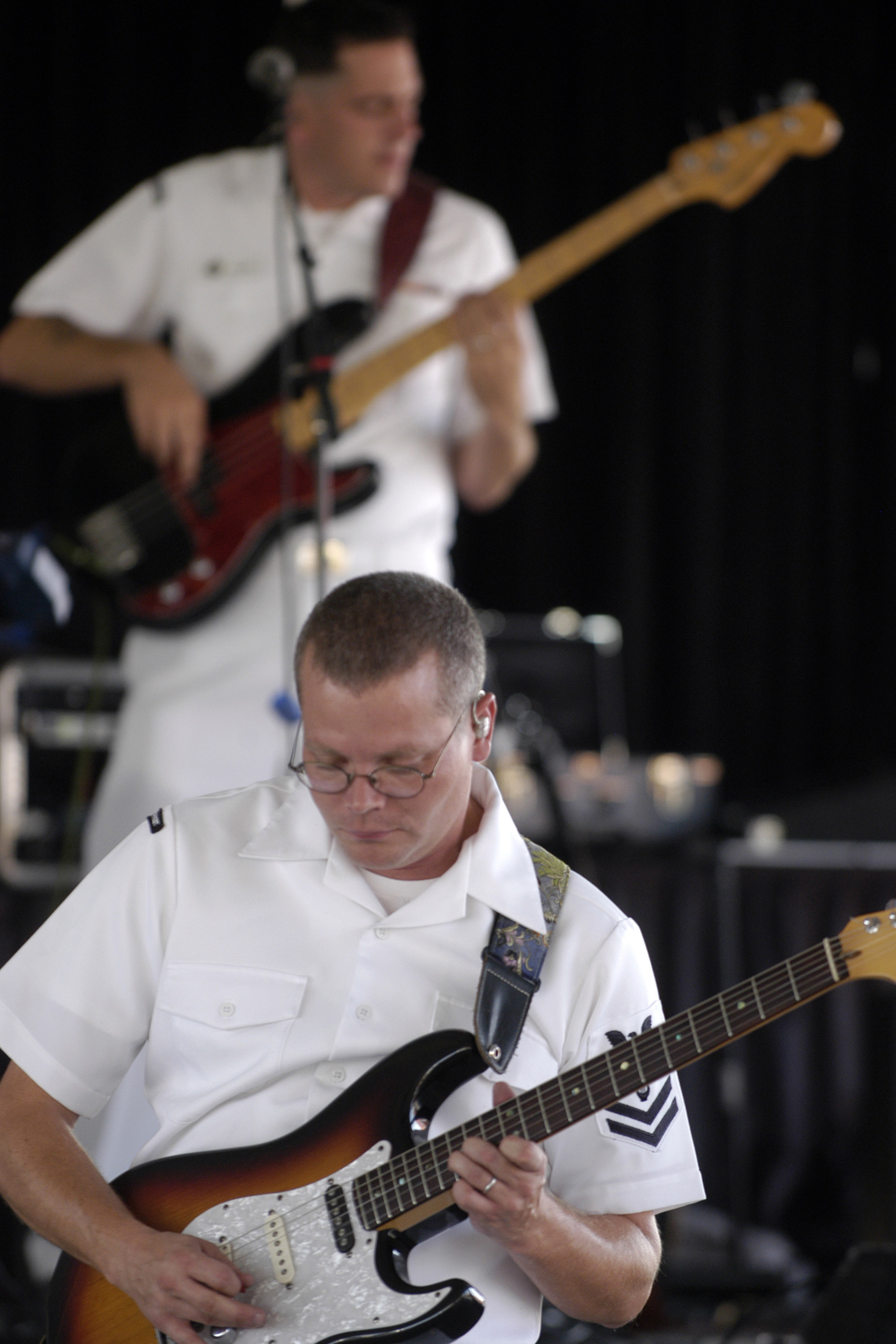
The U.S. Navy Band Southwest, the Destroyers, performing at the State Fair in conjunction with Utah Navy Week

During the nineteenth century, the fair was held irregularly. The Society's determination to keep both the fair and itself alive despite adversity is one notable chapter in the history of frontier life in Utah. It was the intent from the beginning to hold an annual fair, but there were lean years when the pioneers had little to exhibit and no fairs were held.

The housing of the Fair had always presented a difficult problem. For many years the exposition was shuffled from place to place, held at any suitable quarters that could be borrowed or hired.

The first Territorial fair in 1856 was held at the Deseret Store and Tithing Office, the Social Hall was home to the second fair until 1860 when the fair returned to the Deseret Store.

Statements of elderly Utah residents interviewed for the Fair's Golden Jubilee in 1928, recount that the exhibits in early fairs were meager, but that the public showed keen interest and eagerly sought space to exhibit the products of their homes, shops, and fields.

The records from the 1863 Fair show this interest from the following awards; "Best boar, ornamental basket, ladies' straw hat, best work table, picture frame, pair of woolen hose, bull 4 years old, patch-work quilt, best bread, sample cotton, door lock, mare colt, six brooms, six carrots, red cabbages, best map of Utah, best collection garden seeds, best shoe laces, best white gooseberries, best acre of flax, best Enfield rifle, best plaid flannel, best brown mare, best gross matches, best shoe blacking, two weaver's reeds, best sample soap, best early peaches, best quart turpentine, best peck potatoes, best penmanship, 2 ewes, ornamental needle work, best fall pear, best verbena, best phlox, best butter, best sign painting, best Jersey, best baby chair, best sweet potato, best cotton gingham, best 100 pounds flour."

These awards are listed in the order in which they appear in historical records. Items were not classified as they are today and exhibits were displayed as a miscellany of frontier wealth. It can be seen that nearly every art and industry is represented, showing the true labors of early pioneers. In 1864, it is recorded that the directors regretfully decided that there could be no Fair that year because reports that the "gardens are all drying up". But they remained undaunted and the next year, they would try again.

By 1869, a new location was secured for the exhibition and for the next few years and the fair was held in the 13th LDS Ward Meeting House, located on Second South where the Old Hippodrome Theatre was later built. Show animals could not be exhibited inside and were tethered outdoors to hitching posts and fence rails surrounding the hall.

After the Fair of 1873, the 13th Ward Meeting House was abandoned as the home of the fair and the annual expositions were held in new municipal market building that stood near "Market Row," at First South and West Temple.

From 1881 through 1887 no fair was held due to little financial help from the Territorial Legislature.

The 1888 fair was held at the "Tenth Ward Square," later to be the site of the Utah Light & Traction Company car barns and where Trolley Square now stands. The Legislature of that year appointed a new board of twelve members and made a liberal appropriation for improvements and premium awards; though the fair of 1888 was listed as "an unqualified success."

By 1889 the Territory of Deseret had averaged only one Fair every two years.

=== A time of change ===
By the late nineteenth century, the Utah Territory was changing. As part of that process, and reflecting the changes that were taking place, the purpose and nature of the fair changed.

Following Utah's admission as a state in 1896, the Deseret Agricultural Society came under the direct control of the state government. Its president and Board of Directors were appointed by the governor with the consent of the legislature and the annual fairs became officially "State Fairs."

Flag of Utah

Gradually the fair came to be seen in a new light. It continued to be a testimony to hard work and the fruitfulness of the soil, but it lost its religious significance and it was no longer viewed as a means of promoting self-sufficiency.

Utah's agricultural system had evolved from a local market and was no longer geographically, socially or culturally isolated from the rest of the country. The fair was now seen as serving public relations and commercial purposes. It was, "a way of extending our markets and the advertising agents of the state." The Fair's purpose was not only the promotion of Utah but, also the promotion of the entire nation. The Utah State Fair was seen as simply one of many state fairs that worked to "advance the countries welfare."

=== Fair history ===
Nine years after the pioneers arrived in the Salt Lake Valley, they held their first state fair in October 1856 then called the "Deseret Fair". Although the exhibits were described as meager, the public showed keen interest and eagerly sought space to display some of the finest products from their own homes, shops, and fields.

Until the current Fairpark location was acquired, finding a home for the fair always presented a problem. The first fairs were held in several locations including the Deseret Store and Tithing Office where Hotel Utah now renamed The Joseph Smith Building was constructed, a site on State Street at 200 South known as "Market Row", 100 South and West Temple, and the "Tenth Ward Square", where Trolley Square now stands.

Even through lean years, drought, and little financial help from the Territorial Legislature, the fair managed to survive.

In 1902, the Legislature purchased the 65 acres of the Fairpark, originally called "Agriculture Park." The first building at the Fairpark was the Horticulture Building (later renamed Promontory Hall). Local architects, Walter E. Ware and Alberto Treganza (who also designed the First Presbyterian Church, University Club Building, and Westminster College's Gymnasium) designed the Horticulture Building sometimes called the "Gateway to the Fairpark" constructed on the corner of North Temple and 1000 West. It is one of the most beautiful buildings on the Fairpark, featuring a combination of early Mission Style and Beaux Arts, it is no exception to the outstanding work of Ware and Treganza.

In 1912,`Abdu'l-Bahá, eldest son of Bahá'u'lláh, the founder of the Bahá'í Faith, visited the State Fair on his stop at Salt Lake City during his historic journey through the United States to spread the Bahá'í teachings. At the fair he purchased seeds to bring back to the Bahá'í Holy Land of Haifa Israel

This fair was cancelled in 1917–18 and 1942–44.

The Horticulture Building was renamed "Promontory Hall" in 1977 and it is still used to display exhibits during the annual State Fair and plays host to many other trade shows, concerts, and events throughout the year like many of the other treasured facilities at the Fairpark.

Although in the 1980s many of the Fairpark's once beautiful buildings fell into a state of disrepair, and the grounds themselves suffered. In 1988, many of the buildings, including the Horticulture Building, were renovated. Having been condemned Exhibition Hall, originally named the Manufacturing and Mining Building, was renovated and re-opened in 1989. Now called the Grand Building, it is a major landmark of the Fairpark. In 1997, the Coliseum another of the original buildings at the Fairpark was demolished due to safety concerns.

The Legislature privatized the Utah State Fair Organization in 1995, giving the gubernatorial appointed board of directors a mandate to make the Fair profitable. The desire was to allow the Fair to no longer be subsidized by taxpayers. The Fairpark Staff works diligently to establish year-round events at the Fairpark to ensure there will always be a Utah State Fair.

The Utah State Fair has continued to promote Utah and its products with events by the Utah Dairy Council, Utah Beef Council, Utah Wool Growers Association, and the Utah Farm Bureau. "Utah's Own" Food Court features locally grown and prepared foods from around the state. The Utah State Fair strives to blend the best of Utah tradition and heritage with new technology and modern ideals.

Despite the COVID-19 pandemic, the 2020 Utah State Fair proceeded as planned, albeit in a slightly modified presentation. The theme for that year's fair was named "A September to Remember", as a reference to the modifications made due to the pandemic.

- Utah State Fair Grounds
- U.S. National Register of Historic Places
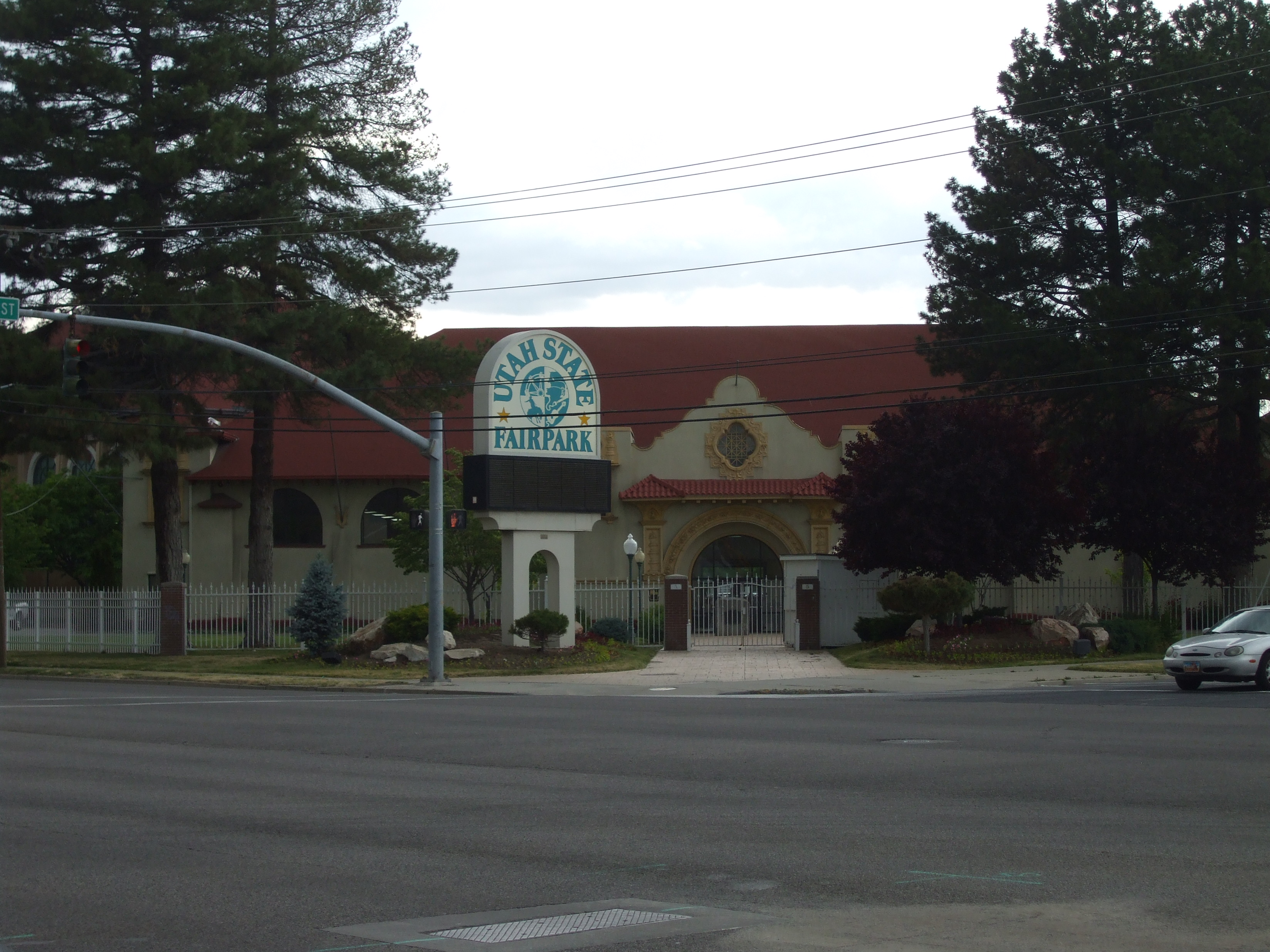
- Fair grounds main entrance, May 2009

- Location within Utah Location within the United States
- Location: 10th West and North Temple streets Salt Lake City, Utah; United States
- Area: 50 acres (20 ha)
- Built: 1902
- Architect: Multiple
- Architectural style: Mixed (more Than 2 Styles From Different Periods)
- NRHP reference No.: 81000583
- Added to NRHP: January 27, 1981

== The Fairpark ==
The Fairpark, home to the Utah State Fair, is available for many other uses throughout the year. It holds concerts and events throughout the year, including the punk rock music festival Warped Tour.

The Fairpark's mission statement is, "Preserving Utah's Traditions."

The fairground was listed on the National Register of Historic Places in 1981; the listing included 27 contributing buildings and 15 deemed not to be historic, on 50 acres (20 ha).

The Agriculture building, from 1902, was designed by prominent architects Ware & Treganza.

== See also ==
- List of state fairs
- National Register of Historic Places listings in Salt Lake City
- Fairpark station: light rail station serving the fairgrounds and surrounding area
