= Green Line (TRAX) =

Light rail line in the Salt Lake Valley of Utah

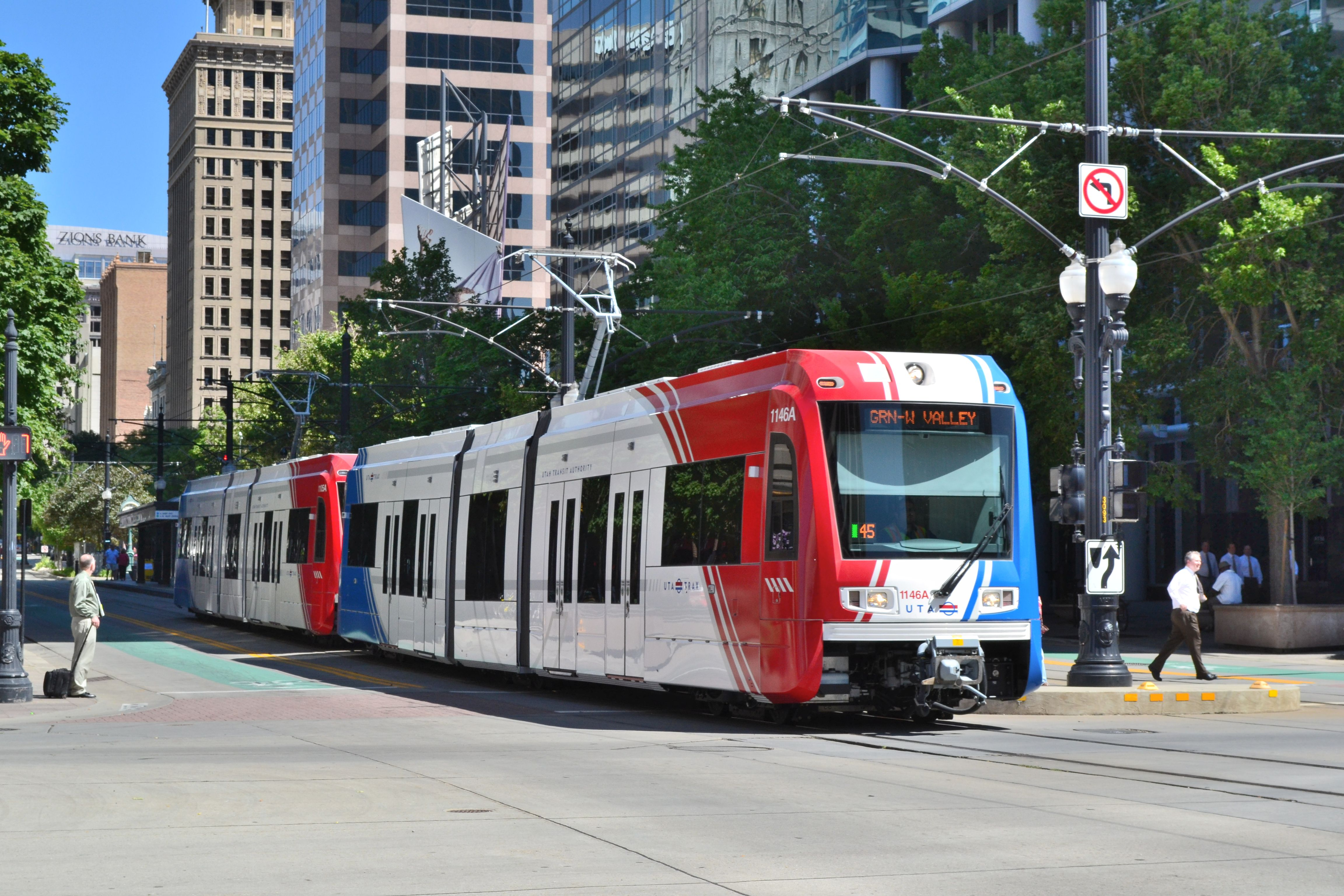
- Green Line train at the Gallivan Plaza station in Downtown Salt Lake City, Utah

Overview
- Owner: Utah Transit Authority (UTA)
- Locale: Salt Lake Valley, Utah, U.S.
- Termini: Airport; West Valley Central
- Stations: 19

Service
- Type: Light rail
- System: TRAX
- Route number: 704
- Rolling stock: Siemens S70 US

History
- Opened: August 7, 2011; 15 years ago

Technical
- Number of tracks: 2
- Track gauge: 4 ft 8 1/2 in (1,435 mm) standard gauge
- Electrification: Overhead line, 750 V DC
- Operating speed: 65 mph (105 km/h) (max.)

The Green Line is a light rail line on the Utah Transit Authority's (UTA) TRAX system in Salt Lake City, Utah, in the United States, operated by the Utah Transit Authority (UTA). It opened on August 7, 2011, and runs between Airport Station at the Salt Lake City International Airport and West Valley Central Station in West Valley City (via Downtown Salt Lake City) serving a total of eighteen stations: thirteen in Salt Lake City, one in South Salt Lake, and four in West Valley City.

== Route ==
The TRAX Green Line is designated as UTA Route 704.

=== West Valley Central to Central Pointe Station ===
The Green Line begins with the West Valley Central Station at the West Valley Intermodal Center, which is located at 2750 West 3590 South in West Valley City. Just after leaving that station, it immediately passes between the West Valley City Police Department and the West Valley City Hall, before heading north down the middle of Constitution Boulevard (South 2700 West). After passing by the northern end of Valley Fair Mall, it crosses West 3500 South (SR-171) and continues north in the median of Constitution Boulevard to West 3100 South. It then heads east along the south side of West 3100 South (with a sidewalk between the tracks and the roadway) and crosses over I-215 and past the north side of the Maverik Center. Just after the Maverik Center it turns north, resuming a course in the median of the street, and immediately reaches the next station, Decker Lake, at 3070 South 2200 West. After Decker Lake it heads northeast in the median of Decker Lake Drive until that street heads due north at Research Way (West 2770 South). At Research Way the Green Line turns east again and heads down the median of that street. Just before South Redwood Road (South 1700 West/SR-68) is Redwood Junction.

Leaving the roadway right-of-way, after an at-grade crossing on South Redwood Road, the Green Line continues east, crossing Lester Street (South 1595 West), until it reaches the Jordan River. The tracks head north until they cross West Parkway Avenue (West 2455 South) and then runs down the middle of Winston Street (South 1070 West) to River Trail at 2340 South. After that station it continues north for about a half a block before leaving the street via an at-grade crossing and heading east. It immediately crosses the Jordan River (passing from West Valley City into South Salt Lake), and then follows along the south side of the 21st South Freeway (SR-201). After passing the Jordan River Service Center (one of UTA's two TRAX maintenance facilities) on the south, the track use a series of viaducts to cross South 900 West, South 700 West, the north end of Union Pacific's Roper Rail Yard, the UTA FrontRunner tracks, and South 600 West before reaching the "Spaghetti Bowl" (the junction of I-15, I-80 and SR-201).

From South 600 West the Green Line briefly follows the route of the old Denver and Rio Grande Western Railroad (D&RGW) Sugar House Branch, which goes under I-15/I-80 and then briefly runs along the south side of West Andy Avenue to South 300 West. After crossing South 300 West it continues east until about 220 West where it reaches the Union Pacific right-of-way and takes a sharp turn north as it merges with the Blue and Red lines), before entering Central Pointe, which is just south of West 2100 South (SR-201).

=== Central Pointe to Gallivan Plaza ===
Central Pointe is the only TRAX station served by the S Line. The S Line platform is situated just southeast of the TRAX platform. (The S Line provides streetcar service east to the Fairmont stop in the Sugar House neighborhood of Salt Lake City.)

Upon crossing West 2100 South the three TRAX lines leave South Salt Lake and enter Salt Lake City and continue north as they cross West 1700 South and West 1300 South. Just north of West 1300 South is Ballpark, which provides service to Smith's Ballpark. (Immediately north of this station is a non-revenue track that extends northwest to South 400 West at West 900 South and then north to West 600 South.) After Ballpark the three lines continue north in the center median of South 200 West, crossing under the 900 South/I-15 on and off ramps, until they reach the next station, 900 South. This station, which is just north of West 900 South, is an infill station and the last stop before the TRAX lines reach Downtown Salt Lake City.

The three lines continue north in the median of South 200 West, crossing West 800 South, until they reach West 700 South. At West 700 South they turn east and proceed down the middle of that street for two blocks, crossing South West Temple Street (SR-270). At South Main Street, the lines turn north and continue down the center median of that street and cross West 600 South (Martin Luther King Jr Boulevard/SR-269 eastbound), pass between the Grand America Hotel and the Little America Hotel, and then cross West 500 South (Cesar E Chavez Boulevard/SR-269 westbound). Just north of West 500 South and slightly west of the Scott Matheson Courthouse, is the first station within the Free Fare Zone, Courthouse. At West 400 South (University Boulevard/US Highway 89) the Red Line turns east and heads toward Library and eventually the University of Utah while the Green and Blue lines continue north. After crossing West 300 South (West Broadway) the two lines reach Gallivan Plaza, which is just west of the Wells Fargo Center and the Gallivan Center.

=== Gallivan Plaza to Arena Station ===
Continuing in the median of South Main Street, the Green and Blue lines continue north crossing West 200 South and West 100 South before reaching City Center. This station is in the middle of the new City Creek Center commercial and residential development. At the north end of South Main Street the two lines turn west down the middle of West South Temple Street for a little more than a block before reaching the next station, Temple Square. This station is just southwest of Temple Square (home to the Salt Lake Temple, Salt Lake Tabernacle, and other notable buildings of the Church of Jesus Christ of Latter-day Saints). It is also just south of the Family History Library, about two blocks south of the LDS Conference Center, and immediately north of Abravanel Hall and the Salt Palace.

Continuing down the median of West South Temple Street the lines reach Arena (formerly Delta Center). This station is immediately north of Delta Center, east of the Union Pacific Depot, and south of LDS Business College. Arena was formerly the terminus of both the Sandy/Salt Lake and the old University Line. However, an extension opened on April 16, 2008, which provided access to the Salt Lake City Intermodal Hub and the new FrontRunner commuter rail train. Eventually, the Sandy/Salt Lake Line was renamed the Blue Line and the University Line was shut down. About this same time the Green Line was created and its route continued, along with the Blue Line, on to Salt Lake Central (Salt Lake City Intermodal Hub). However, with the rerouting of the Green Line to accommodate the Airport Extension, Arena became the temporary terminus of the Green Line from December 9, 2012, to April 13, 2013. Arena is the last station on the Green Line within the Free Fare Zone, along with the Blue Line.

=== Arena Station to Airport Station ===
Following Arena, the two lines continue on to 400 West where they divide paths. The Blue Line turns south down the middle of South 400 West towards Planetarium and eventually ending at the Salt Lake Intermodal Hub, while the Green Line turns north. After about a block down the middle of North 400 West, the Green Line turns west to run on the north side of West North Temple Street (West 100 North) and ascends the North Temple Viaduct to next station, North Temple Bridge/Guadalupe. This station is the only bi-level station operated by UTA. It is also flying junction since Green Line tracks cross over the FrontRunner and Union Pacific tracks. The station is on the viaduct and the North Temple is at ground level (at grade) just north of the viaduct, with escalators and stairs to transfer passengers between the two stations.

Leaving North Temple Bridge/Guadalupe the Green Line crosses back over the Union Pacific right-of-way and descends to North 600 West. Just after crossing North 600 West the tracks jog from the north side of North Temple Street to the median and then cross back under I-15. Just after crossing North 800 West it reaches Jackson/Euclid. Continuing west down the median of West North Temple Street, it crosses North 900 West and North 1000 West before reaching Fairpark at 1150 West. This station is located immediately south of the Utah State Fairpark (home of the annual Utah State Fair and other events). Just after Fairpark, the Green Line crosses back over the Jordan River and passes the Rocky Mountain Power facility on the south before reaching Power at 1500 West.

From Power, the Green Line continues west down the median of West North Temple Street, crossing North Redwood Road, until it reaches the next to the last station on the line, 1940 West North Temple. From this station it crosses under I-215 and then continues down the median of Old Highway 186 as that road splits from West North Temple Street and heads southwest towards I-80. Just after crossing South 2400 West, the Green Line crosses to the north side of the road as Old Highway 186 continues southwest to I-80. The tracks continue on the north side of the I-80 right-of-way, crossing over the Surplus Canal, until Old Highway 186 curves north again just east of the I-80/Bangerter Highway (SR-154) interchange and then merges with Terminal Drive as that road heads northeast and then north to the Salt Lake City International Airport. The tracks parallel the east side of Terminal Drive until it reaches the Airport Station, which is located immediately south of Terminal One. There is direct access to the terminal from the north end of the platform.

=== Park and Ride ===
Many TRAX stations include free Park and Ride lots, with some lots having as few as six parking spaces and others having nearly 1200. However, there are certain restrictions for all lots (for example, no 24-hour parking).

=== Free Fare Zone ===
UTA currently has a Free Fare Zone in Downtown Salt Lake City for transportation patrons that both enter and exit bus or TRAX service within the Zone. The Zone covers an area of approximately thirty-six city blocks and the boundaries are roughly North Temple, 200 East, 500 South, and 400 West. TRAX stations within the Zone include Arena, City Center, Courthouse, Gallivan Plaza (mistakenly identified as "Gallivan Center Station" on the Free Fare Zone map), Planetarium, and Temple Square. In addition, the Free Fare Zone also includes the area of the State Capitol (north to 500 North), the bus stops on 400 South between 200 East and 300 East, and three additional TRAX stations: Library, Old GreekTown, and Salt Lake Central. In June 2012 UTA revealed plans to eliminate the Free Fare Zone, but by September 2012 it announced that it would continue the Zone, but with some minor adjustments, including when and how fares are collected.

== Airport extension ==
Construction began on October 22, 2008, on an extension to the Salt Lake City International Airport. The extension included six new TRAX stations. In addition to the Airport Station, five new stations were constructed along West North Temple Street (West 100 North), including one on top of the newly built North Temple Viaduct bridge. The old bridge was torn down and a new one constructed as part of the project. The new bridge features a TRAX station on top and a FrontRunner commuter rail station underneath. After December 9, 2012, service on the Green Line was cut back to Arena in order to prepare for test trains and service to the Airport, thus permanently ending service (via the Green Line) to the first three stations of the former route (Salt Lake Central, Old GreekTown, and Planetarium). Service to the airport began April 14, 2013.

In 2014, construction commenced to completely rebuild the airport terminal, adjacent to its existing location. In September 2020, the newly rebuilt airport was opened, causing the TRAX line to no longer reach the airport terminal. To accommodate passengers to the new terminal while the station was relocated, UTA operated a bus bridge between the 1940 West North Temple station and the new terminal. On October 25, 2021, the TRAX station had been rebuilt at the new terminal, and normal train service all the way to the airport resumed.

== Service ==
The Green Line (numbered 704) operates from 4:35 a.m. to 12:15 a.m. on weekdays and Saturdays with a frequency of 15 minutes for most of the day. On Sundays, it operates from 5:15 a.m. to 11:55 p.m. with a frequency of 30 minutes for most of the day. A one-way trip from Airport station to West Valley Central station takes approximately 48 minutes.

== Stations ==
The following table lists the current stations of the Green Line, from north to south.

Key
Ø	Free Fare Zone

Station Name	Municipality	Date opened	Major connections and notes
Airport	Salt Lake City	April 14, 2013	Serves Salt Lake City International Airport
1940 West North Temple	Salt Lake City	April 14, 2013	
Power	Salt Lake City	April 14, 2013	
Fairpark	Salt Lake City	April 14, 2013	Serves the Utah State Fairgrounds
Jackson/Euclid	Salt Lake City	April 14, 2013	
North Temple Bridge/Guadalupe	Salt Lake City	April 14, 2013	FrontRunner
Arena Ø	Salt Lake City	December 14, 1999	Blue Line; Serves Delta Center
Temple Square Ø	Salt Lake City	December 14, 1999	Blue Line; Serves Abravanel Hall and Temple Square
City Center Ø	Salt Lake City	December 14, 1999	Blue Line; Serves City Creek Center
Gallivan Plaza Ø	Salt Lake City	December 14, 1999	Blue Line; Serves the Gallivan Center
Courthouse Ø	Salt Lake City	December 14, 1999	Blue Line; Red Line; Serves the Federal Courthouse and Third District Courthouse
600 South	Salt Lake City	July 26, 2022	Blue Line; Red Line
900 South	Salt Lake City	May 19, 2005	Blue Line; Red Line
Ballpark	Salt Lake City	December 4, 1999	Blue Line; Red Line; Serves Smith's Ballpark; Park and ride: 170 spaces
Central Pointe	South Salt Lake	December 4, 1999	Blue Line; Red Line; S Line; Park and ride: 57 spaces
River Trail	West Valley City	August 7, 2011	Park and ride: 100 spaces
Redwood Junction	West Valley City	August 7, 2011	
Decker Lake	West Valley City	August 7, 2011	Serves Maverik Center; Park and ride: 750
West Valley Central	West Valley City	August 7, 2011	Midvalley Express Serves Valley Fair Mall; Park and ride: 80

== See also ==
- List of rapid transit systems
- Transportation in Salt Lake City
- TRAX (light rail)
- TRAX Blue Line
- TRAX Red Line
- FrontRunner
- Utah Transit Authority bus rapid transit
- S Line (formerly known as Sugar House Streetcar)
