= Valley Fair Mall (Utah) =

- Location: West Valley City, Utah
- Coordinates: 40°41′40″N 111°57′20″W
- Opened: 1970
- Num. of stores: 120+
- Num. of anchor tenants: 8 (7 open, 1 vacant)
- Floor area: 831,667 sq ft (77,264.4 m^{2})
- Floors: 1 (with limited 2nd floor office space)
- Website: shopvalleyfair.com

Valley Fair Mall is a 831,667-square-foot (77,264.4 m^{2}) single-level regional shopping center located in West Valley City, Utah, United States. Anchor stores are All Star Bowling & Entertainment, Hobby Lobby, JCPenney, Megaplex Theatres, Ross Dress For Less, Ulta Beauty, DD’s Discounts and a store which used to be Old Navy.

== History ==
The shopping center was constructed in 1970 on the southwest corner of the I-215 belt route and West 3500 South (Utah State Route 171 in the Salt Lake Valley. Valley Fair Mall hosts approximately 120 in-line shops, a 13-bay, 450-seat food court, 15-screen Megaplex movie theater.

In 2005 Satterfield Helm Management, Inc. of Sandy, Utah purchased the mall and in 2006 announced plans for a renovation of the center. A new Costco store opened in 2007 as the first part of a four-phase redevelopment. Phase II of the redevelopment was completed in June 2010.

Macy's, formerly ZCMI and Meier & Frank, closed in 2016 and became All Star Bowling & Entertainment and Hobby Lobby in 2019.

On January 21, 2020, it was announced that Bed Bath & Beyond would be closing as part of a plan to close 40 stores nationwide. The store remained vacant until February 28, 2026, becoming DD’s Discounts.

On May 8, 2023, a shooting occurred at the mall. Police reported that a 25-year-old man suffered a non-life-threatening injury from a gunshot wound to his hip. The incident took place in front of a store near 3601 S. 2700 West. Three suspects left the mall immediately after the shooting and were arrested at a TRAX station across from the mall. Approximately 20 minutes after the shooting, three "juvenile male" suspects were taken into police custody and a handgun was recovered.

On August 25, 2025, Old Navy closed their location at the mall.

On July 14, 2026, a knife-wielding assailant stabbed and critically injured a Muslim kiosk worker who was a few blocks near the All Star Bowling & Entertainment store. The suspected assailant, Peter Michael Larsen, was allegedly motivated by hatred of Muslims. Larsen was later taken into custody by police and charged with attempted murder.
