= Orange Line (TRAX) =

Future light rail line in Salt Lake City, U.S.

Overview
- Owner: Utah Transit Authority (UTA)
- Locale: Salt Lake Valley, Utah, U.S.
- Termini: Airport; Arapeen

Service
- Type: Light rail
- System: TRAX
- Route number: 710

History
- Opened: 2032 (planned)

Technical
- Number of tracks: 2
- Track gauge: 4 ft 8 1/2 in (1,435 mm) standard gauge
- Electrification: Overhead line, 750 V DC

The Orange Line is a planned light rail line on the TRAX system in the Salt Lake Valley of Utah operated by the Utah Transit Authority (UTA). It was proposed in April 2024 as part of a future realignment of light rail lines in Downtown Salt Lake City and would overlap with portions of the existing Green and Red lines. The Orange Line is planned to begin construction in 2029 and enter service by 2032 as part of infrastructure upgrades to prepare for the 2034 Winter Olympics in Salt Lake City.

The preferred route for the line, selected in January 2025, would run jointly with the realigned Blue Line from Airport station to 400 West, where it would turn south to follow the Green Line. The Orange Line would then turn east onto 400 South to join the Red Line through Downtown Salt Lake City and the University of Utah campus. The two lines would split beyond University South Campus station with the Orange Line serving two stations on Arapeen Drive, where it terminates. Other alternatives that were proposed would have had connections to Salt Lake Central station, but would have had several additional turns.
