= West Valley Central station =

Light rail station in Utah

West Valley Central
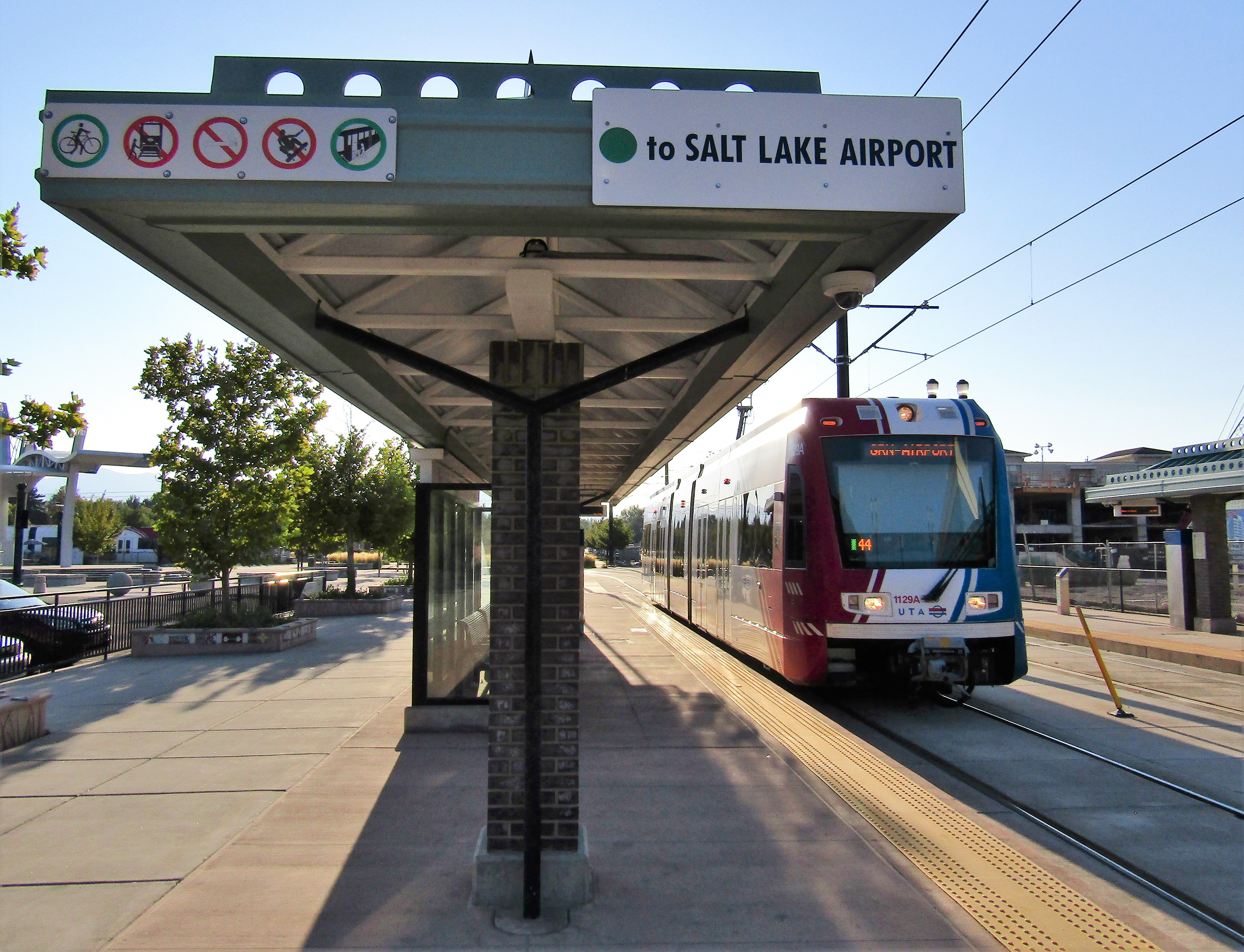
- West Valley Central station platform

General information
- Location: 2750 West 3590 South; West Valley City, Utah; United States
- Coordinates: 40.6944°N 111.9591°W
- Owner: Utah Transit Authority (UTA)
- Platforms: 2 side platforms
- Tracks: 2
- Connections: UTA: MVX, 35, 39, 47, F232, 240, 248, 509, 513

Construction
- Structure type: At-grade
- Parking: 80 spaces
- Accessible: Yes

History
- Opened: September 17, 2009; 16 years ago (bus). August 7, 2011; 15 years ago (TRAX)

Services
Preceding station	Utah Transit Authority	Following station
Decker Lake toward Airport	Green Line	Terminus
Location

West Valley Central station (also called the West Valley Intermodal Hub) is a light rail station in West Valley City, Utah served by the Green Line of the Utah Transit Authority's (UTA) TRAX light rail system. The Green Line provides service from the Salt Lake City International Airport to this station (via Downtown Salt Lake City).

== Description ==
The TRAX portion of the station is located at 2750 West Lehman Avenue (3590 South) with the two side platforms being situated immediately south of and parallel to that street. The MAX stop at the station is at 2820 West Lehman Avenue with the rest of the bus stops at 2860 West 3650 South. The free Park and Ride lot, which has 80 spaces, is at 2842 Lehman Avenue and is accessible from 3500 South (SR-171) (and the 3500 South/I-215 interchange) by heading south on Market Street (2810 West). The station is in the middle of the partially completed Fairbourne Station development, which includes several West Valley municipal buildings. Further east of the station is the Valley Fair Mall, with a residential neighborhood to the south. The entire intermodal hub is operated by the Utah Transit Authority.

== History ==
Construction on the West Valley Intermodal Hub began in 2007 and was completed in 2009 at a cost of approximately $9 million. More than $7 million of that was paid for by the federal government, with the rest being paid for by local taxes. When the hub opened on September 17, 2009, it immediately had service by five local bus routes, in addition to the 3500 South MAX (BRT). At the time of its opening, the hub was more of a bus depot than an intermodal hub, as construction was not yet complete on the light rail line. However, it was anticipated that light rail would serve the station in the near future and it was referred to as the West Valley Intermodal Hub anyway. The station opened with bus service only (including the 3500 South MAX) on September 17, 2009. The TRAX portion opened for service on August 7, 2011, as part of the West Valley extension of the Green Line.

Initially the Green Line connected to the Salt Lake City Intermodal Hub (Salt Lake Central Station) in Downtown Salt Lake City. On December 9, 2012, Green Line service ended at Arena in preparation for the opening of the airport extension of the Green Line. The Airport extension opened on April 14, 2013, and service now continues on from Arena to Airport at the Salt Lake City International Airport (permanently bypassing Salt Lake Central).

== Fairbourne Station ==
Fairbourne Station is a $500 million 40 acres (16 ha) transit-oriented commercial development that was planned specifically in conjunction with the construction of the West Valley Intermodal Hub. (The area was previously referred to as City Center.) With the hub at its center, sections of the development are eventually planned for areas to the west, north, and east covering the blocks between West 3500 South, South 2700 West (Constitution Way), West 3650 South (Lancer Way), and about 3000 West. It is anchored by the West Valley City civic center (with the West Valley City Police Department to the north, the West Valley City Hall and justice court to the east, and the West Valley Branch of the Salt Lake County Library to the west). The development will add 200,000 square feet (19,000 m^{2}) of restaurant and retail space to complement the existing 1,000,000 square feet (93,000 m^{2}) of space in the nearby Valley Fair Mall. The new Embassy Suites Hotel was completed in July 2012, which includes 162 suites and 6,000 square feet (560 m^{2}) of meeting rooms. When the development is complete there will be 1,000 high-density residences, and 200,000 square feet (19,000 m^{2}) of office space, 2,200 parking spaces, and 4 acres (1.6 ha) of urban park/plaza space.
