= Airport station (Utah Transit Authority) =

Light rail station at Salt Lake International Airport in Salt Lake City, Utah, U.S.

Airport
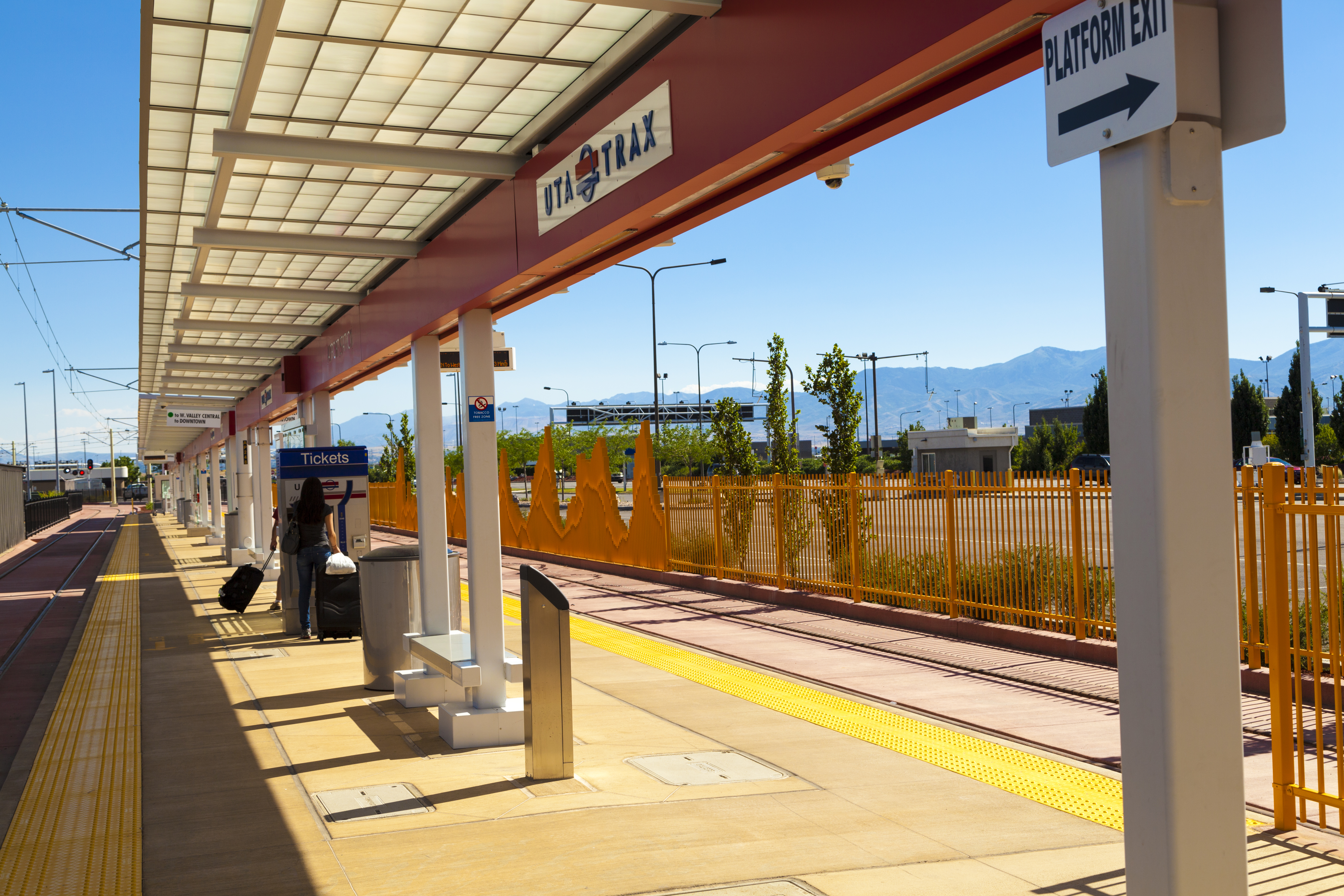
- Passenger platform looking south, prior to its reconstruction.

General information
- Location: 700 North Terminal Drive (Note: UTA also lists 650 North 3700 West another address for the Airport Station. (Terminal Drive runs along the south side of the station and is the main approach roadway for incoming vehicular traffic for the airport. North 3700 West is a restricted access road that runs along the north side of the station.)); Salt Lake City, Utah; United States
- Coordinates: 40°47′01″N 111°58′48″W
- Owner: Utah Transit Authority
- Platforms: 1 island platform

Construction
- Structure type: At-grade
- Parking: Paid parking nearby
- Accessible: Yes

History
- Opened: April 14, 2013
- Rebuilt: 2021

Services
Preceding station	Utah Transit Authority	Following station
Terminus	Green Line	1940 W North Temple toward West Valley Central
Proposed services
Preceding station	Utah Transit Authority	Following station
Terminus	Blue Line	1940 W North Temple toward Draper Town Center
Terminus	Orange Line	1940 W North Temple toward Arapeen
Location

Airport station is a light rail station located at the Salt Lake City International Airport in Salt Lake City, Utah, serviced by the Green Line of the Utah Transit Authority's (UTA) TRAX system. The Green Line has service to West Valley City via Downtown Salt Lake City, and connects with the rest of the TRAX system, as well as UTA's FrontRunner commuter rail and S Line streetcar.

Coinciding with the rebuilding of the airport's main terminal building, the station was moved a few hundred feet to the northwest, directly adjacent to the new terminal. Construction started in March 2020 and finished on October 25, 2021.

== Description ==
The station is located at 700 North Terminal Drive (immediately east of the Terminal), with the island platform extending east from the terminal. Unlike many TRAX stations, Airport does not have a Park and Ride lot. Like many other UTA stations, this station has artwork included in its design. The work of art for the Airport station is the fence separating the station from the roadway approaching the terminal. The yellow fence was built to have the appearance of a mountain skyline. It is called The Canyon and was designed by Gordon Huether of Napa, California. Even though the station is located 6 miles (9.7 km) from Downtown Salt Lake City it is still much closer to the city center than most airports that serve major cities in the United States. It takes about 20 minutes to travel from the Airport station to the downtown area. The station is part of a railway right-of-way that was created specifically for the Green Line. The station opened on April 14, 2013, and is operated by the Utah Transit Authority.

As part of project to rebuild the airport terminal, the Airport TRAX station was torn down and rebuilt closer to the new terminal. To facilitate the new station, the tracks were extended by about 1500 feet. The total cost to relocate the station was $22 million, and the station reopened in the new location in October 2021.
