= Giving Machine =

Vending machine for charity donations

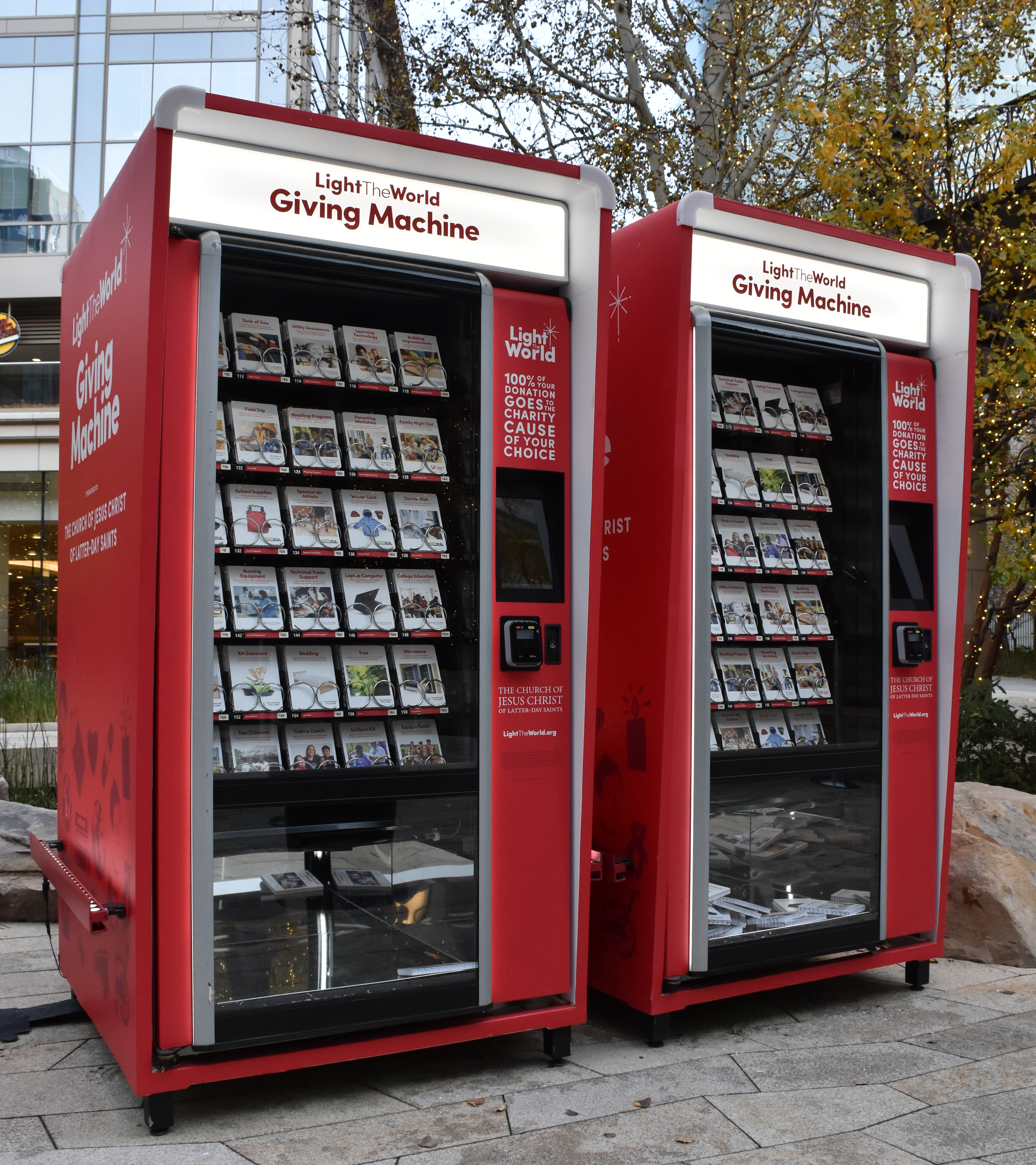
A pair of Giving Machines at City Creek Center in Salt Lake City

A Giving Machine is a specialized vending machine that allows people to donate various items to select nonprofit organizations. The vending machines are put up in public areas throughout the world during the Christmas and holiday season as part of the "Light the World" campaign by the Church of Jesus Christ of Latter-day Saints (LDS Church). They are large, red vending machines that operate similarly to normal ones, but instead of buying a product for yourself, the purchased item becomes a donation to a charity.

== Overview ==
The LDS Church partners with multinational, national, and local charities in various cities throughout the world. These charities select items that will help them fulfill their mission. People using the machines select an item, which is symbolized by a card with a picture, the name of the item, the name of the charity requesting the item, and the price. After purchasing the item, the card drops into a collection bin that allows people to see the items that have been donated. At certain machines, people can take photos with the card to share on social media, with the intention of spreading the initiative.

Examples of items are a $2 box of macaroni and cheese, an $8 hygiene kit, a $200 emergency utility bill payment, and various priced livestock. The money raised from the machines goes to the charity requesting the various items. The charities are expected to use the money for the requested item although occasionally will use it for other similar items or initiatives. The church does not keep any money from the machines, and pays for their upkeep and space rental from other funds; all operational costs for the Giving Machine initiative are covered by the church, so 100% of donations go to the participating nonprofits.

Machines are generally staffed by local Latter-day Saints or Church service missionaries. Volunteers are also recruited publicly through JustServe.

== History ==
The first Giving Machine was unveiled in November 2017 in Salt Lake City, Utah at the Joseph Smith Memorial Building on Temple Square and the number of locations has greatly increased. The machines were not available in 2020 due to the COVID-19 pandemic.

Giving Machines
| Year | Locations | Amount raised |
|---|---|---|
| 2017 | 1 | $500,000 |
| 2018 | 5 | $2.3m |
| 2019 | 10 | $6m |
| 2020 | --- | --- |
| 2021 | 10 | $5.8m |
| 2022 | 28 | $6.2m |
| 2023 | 61 | $10.4m |
| 2024 | 107 | $16m |
| 2025 | 126 | $20m |
