= Annette Cottle =

American volleyball player and coach

Personal information
- Nationality: American
- Height: 5 ft 11 in (1.80 m)
- Education: BYU (1976, 1977); Utah State (1978, 1979)

Volleyball information
- Position: Middle blocker

Annette Cottle is a former volleyball player and coach. She played collegiately for BYU and Utah State.

== Early years ==
Cottle grew up in Salt Lake City, and attended Cottonwood High School.

== College ==
Cottle started at BYU, in 1977, where she played volleyball for coach Elaine Michaelis. That year, the team earned an invitation to the 1977 AIAW National Large College Volleyball Championship, held in Provo, Utah. In the first round, BYU defeated Long Beach State, to reach the Final Four. However, in the semi-finals, USC prevailed. USC went on to win the title game, and became the national champion. Cottle's play earned her a position on the All-American team for the season.

Cottle then transferred to Utah State, due to her connections with Marilyn McReavy and Mary Jo Peppler, the co-coaches at Utah State, both of whom she knew through club volleyball. In her first year at Utah State, she helped lead the team to the 1978 AIAW National Volleyball Championship. Utah State defeated San Diego State in the first round, then defeated Pepperdine in the semifinals, and defeated UCLA in four games to win the National Championship. Cottle won the Broderick Award (now the Honda Sports Award) as the nation's best female collegiate volleyball player in 1978–79. She helped the team reach the title game in her senior year. Utah State won the first two games of the championship, but Hawai'i came back to win the next three, so Utah State ended up as the runner-up in 1980. She was named to the All-America team (Large Colleges) in both 1978 and 1979.

She was inducted into Utah State's Athletic Hall of Fame in 1993, and as part of the team inducted into the Hall of Fame in 2008. She always felt that the order should have been reversed, explaining "I only got into the Hall of Fame because of the team. They really should have been inducted first. In volleyball, it doesn’t matter how good you are on your own. Without your team, you can’t make it.”

Cottle was inducted into the Utah Sports Hall of Fame in 2016.

== Coaching ==
In 1982, Cottle became the women's volleyball coach at Utah State University, replacing Marilyn McReavy and Mary Jo Peppler, where she remained for three years. Later, she coached in the professional National Volleyball Association, as coach of the Utah Predators and the Golden Spikers.
