= Temple Block =

Temple blocks are a type of percussion instrument.

Temple Block may also refer to:

- Temple Block (Los Angeles), a commercial building complex from the 1870s through 1920s
- Temple Block, another name for Temple Square, a Salt Lake City LDS church complex

== See also ==
- Temple Square station, a Salt Lake City light rail station
