= Utah Sports Hall of Fame =

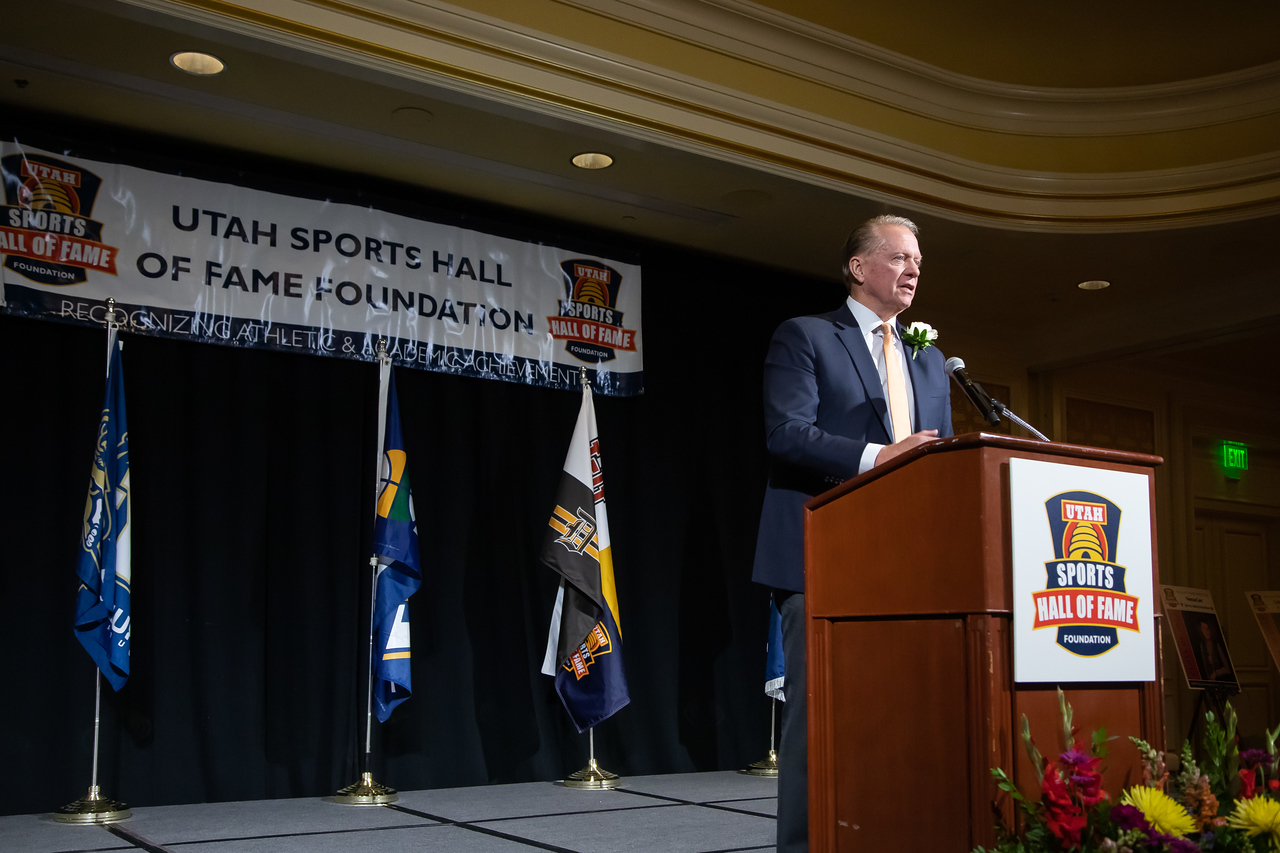
Dave Checketts at Utah Sports Hall of Fame Foundation

The Utah Sports Hall of Fame is an athletics hall of fame in the U.S. state of Utah. The Utah Sports Hall of Fame Foundation, organized in 1967 as The Old Time Athletes Association, was founded "to celebrate and preserve Utah's storied sports heritage." The charter class of 18 members was inducted in 1970 and included Jack Dempsey, Gene Fullmer, and Frank Christensen. Other inductees include professional basketball player Fred Sheffield (1975), Major League Baseball pitcher Kent Peterson (1977), and rodeo champion Earl W. Bascom (1985).

In 2015, the hall inducted former Major League Baseball pitcher Kelly Downs, former Olympic marathoner Ed Eyestone, former National Football League quarterback Scott Mitchell, Olympic gold medalist wrestler and wrestling coach Cael Sanderson, and former college basketball player Wayne Estes.

The fall 2016 class, inducted on October 18 in Salt Lake City, comprised women's college basketball coach Elaine Elliott, former National Basketball Association player Devin Durrant, philanthropist Jon Huntsman Sr., volleyball player Annette Cottle, and NCAA steeplechase champion Farley Gerber.

In May 2019, the organization opened a museum in 99 West on South Temple at City Creek Center in Salt Lake City.
