= Richards Court (City Creek) =

Residential complex in Salt Lake City, Utah, United States

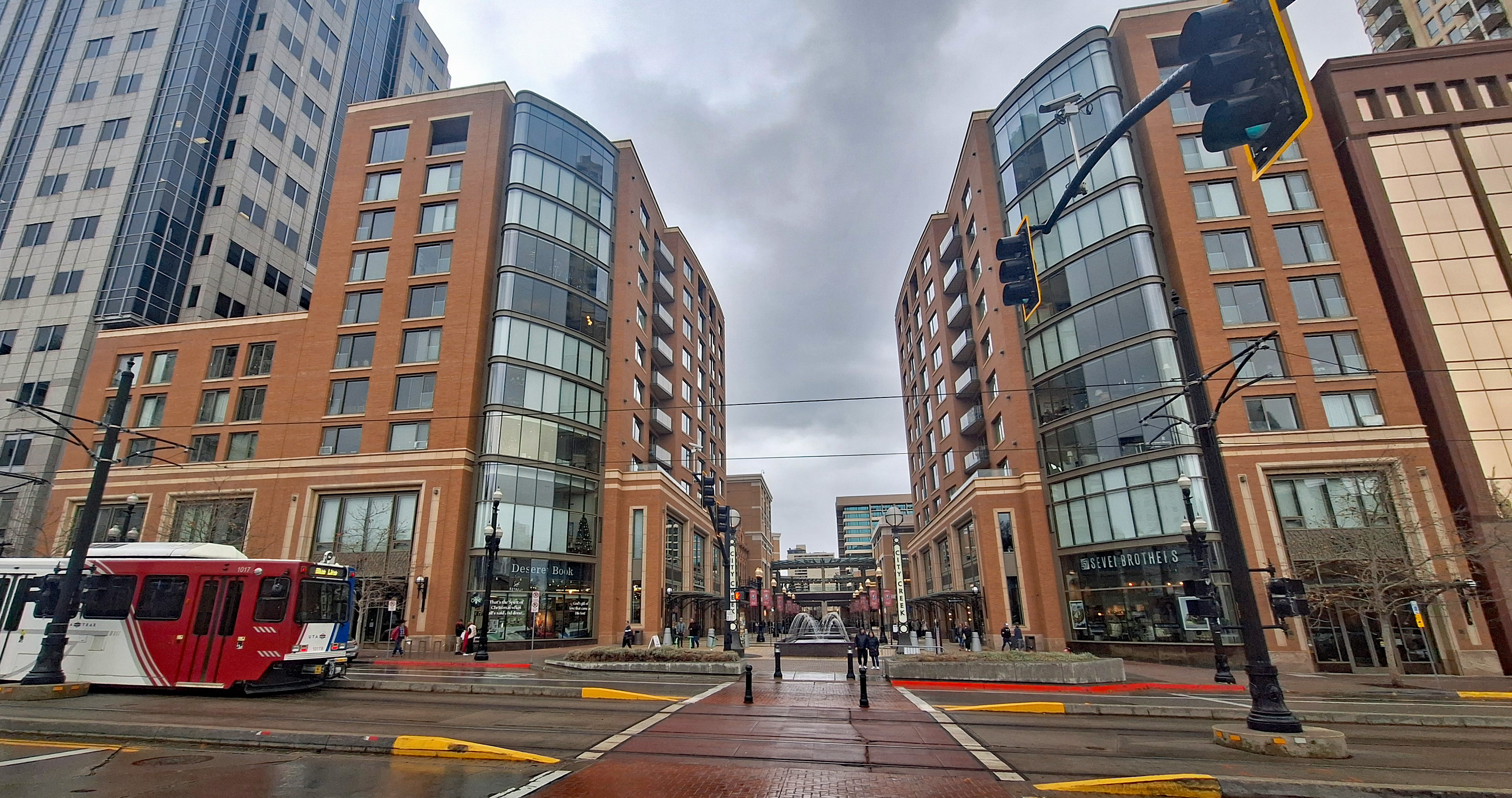
- Interactive map of the Richards Court area
- Former names: Towers 6 & 7
- Etymology: Richards Street (itself named for Willard Richards)

General information
- Status: Completed
- Type: Residential
- Location: 45 / 55 West South Temple, Salt Lake City, United States
- Coordinates: 40.7689°N 111.8925°W
- Owner: City Creek Reserve, Inc. (The Church of Jesus Christ of Latter-day Saints)

Technical details
- Material: Brick façade
- Floor count: 10

Design and construction
- Architecture firm: Zimmer Gunsul Frasca Partnership
- Developer: City Creek Reserve, Inc. (The Church of Jesus Christ of Latter-day Saints)
- Main contractor: Okland Construction

Other information
- Number of rooms: 90 units
- Parking: Underground

Website
- https://richardscourtcoa.com/welcome

Richards Court is a 10-story, two-building condo complex with 90 units at City Creek Center in Salt Lake City, Utah. The complex is located on South Temple street, opposite Temple Square. The buildings consist of brick façades, nine stories of residential with retail on the first (street) level, along with underground parking for residents.

== History ==
The two 10-story buildings were planned as part of the City Creek Center development and were among the first buildings to be completed during the multi-year project. The condos first went on sale in December 2008 and residents began moving in during April 2010.

The street level of each building contains retail space. The western building has housed various restaurants and the eastern building has been home to Deseret Book's flagship store since March 25, 2010.

== Design ==
The buildings were designed by Zimmer Gunsul Frasca Partnership and the main contractor was Okland Construction. The project received a Gold LEED certification.

The two buildings are separated by Richards Street walkway, which follows the path of the original Richards Street. The street had originally been closed and built over in the late 1970s when Crossroads Plaza mall was constructed. When City Creek Center replaced Crossroads Plaza, the old street location was turned into a pedestrian walkway, which restored the connection between South Temple street and 100 South street. A large plaza in the mall, just south of the condos, is also named Richards Court–all named after Willard Richards, an early leader of the Church of Jesus Christ of Latter-day Saints.

== See also ==
- 99 West on South Temple
- The Regent
- City Creek Center
