= David Cruz Thayne =

American businessman (born 1971)

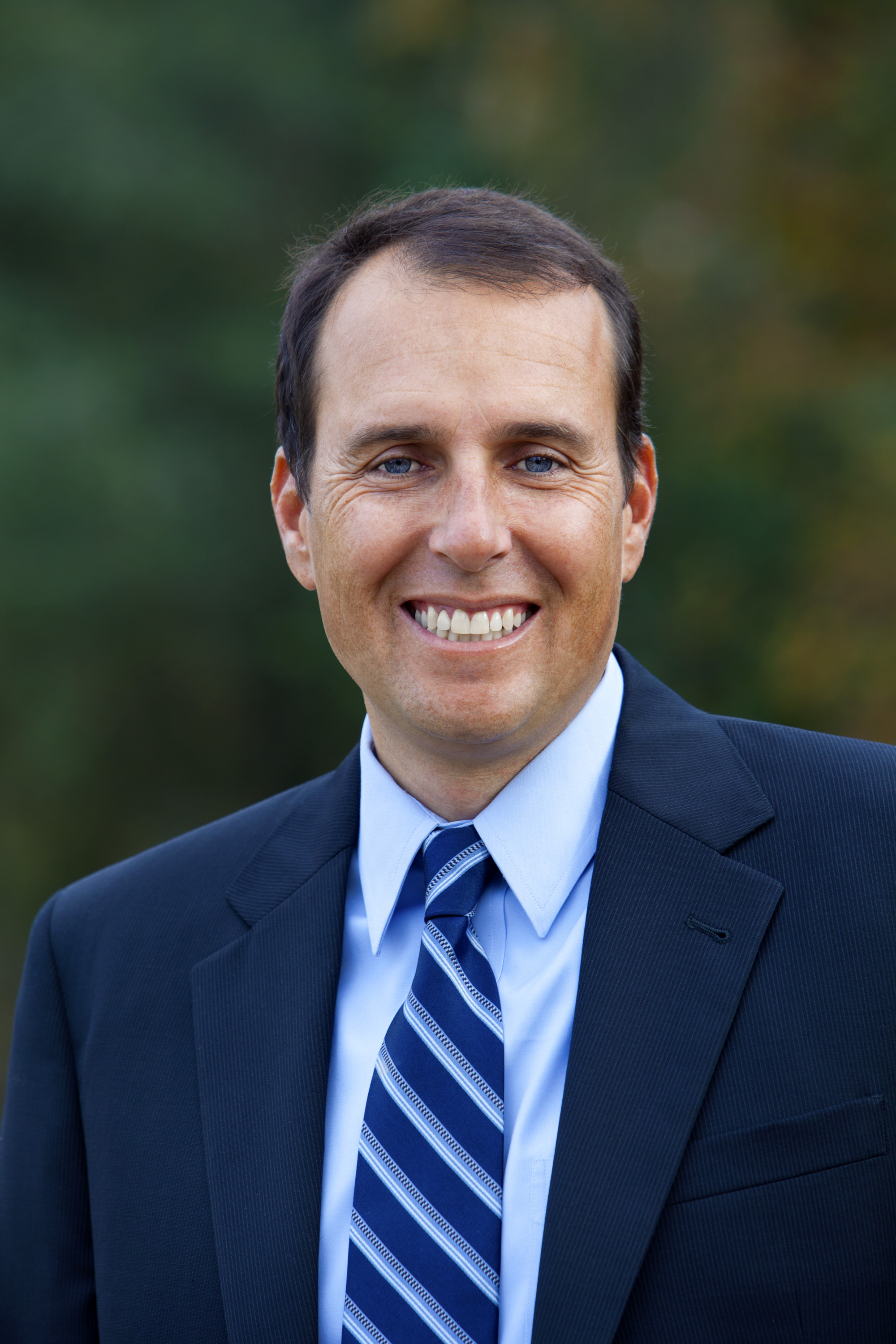
David Cruz Thayne, 2011

David Cruz Thayne (March 10, 1971) is an American small businessman, former professional tennis player, and Democratic congressional candidate. He formerly served as chief of staff and campaign manager to Utah State Senate Minority Leader Scott Howell, a Democrat, and currently operates his own tennis-oriented small business in southern California, which has led to the production of two tennis-oriented documentaries. He was a candidate for California's 26th congressional district in 2012.

== Early life ==
Born in Manchester, New Hampshire, Thayne quickly relocated to Salt Lake City, Utah, with his mother, Gladys Cruz Thayne, a Uruguayan immigrant, and adopted father, David Blaine Thayne, a foreign language and ESL high school teacher. He has eight brothers and sisters: Ana, Silvia, Debbie, Divina, Dave, Trisha, Troy, and Tim. As a result of his family, Thayne continues to be a fluent Spanish speaker. In his youth, Thayne became heavily involved with Utah's youth soccer team and also qualified to play for the 6th division of a Uruguayan professional soccer club: Club Nacional de Football. His grandfather had played professionally for the same club, and two of his uncles had played professionally for Danubio F.C.

Thayne quit soccer at age 13 and began playing tennis for Cottonwood High School, eventually becoming Utah's 4a high school state champion in singles. Partly the result of not reaching his tennis peak until late in high school, David was presented with scholarship opportunities predominantly at local Utah universities and thus opted for a professional tennis career instead, a career that would last eight years.

While a junior in high school, Thayne met and began dating a sophomore in his math class named Katie Smith. After dating for several years, Thayne and Smith married in 1993 at ages 22 and 21 respectively; they now have four children.

== Political career ==
Following his tennis career, Thayne involved himself in Utah politics, becoming campaign manager and later chief of staff for then State Senate Minority Leader Scott Howell. Howell, later the Democratic nominee for U.S. Senate against Orrin Hatch in 2000, had won tough election fights in Republicans districts in 1990 and 1992 and was targeted for defeat in 1996, the year Howell appointed Thayne campaign manager. Despite attacks that Howell was hiding his party and governing philosophy from the voters, Howell won with a 54 to 46 percent margin. His win in Utah's conservative 8th district, as reported by the Deseret News, had many state Republican lawmakers grumbling about the one that got away.

After serving as Howell's Chief of Staff over the next two legislative sessions, Thayne became campaign manager for Steven B. Wall, a Salt Lake City attorney running as a Democrat in Utah's 9th State Senate District. Ultimately, Wall lost the election against Republican incumbent Steven Poulton, 52% to 47% (11,582 votes to 10,334 votes).

== Small businessman ==
Following his management of Wall's campaign, Thayne moved permanently to southern California in 1998, where he began a tennis instruction business. Over the next decade, Thayne would use that start to develop a comprehensive business network, becoming a dealmaker and consultant while also producing three tennis documentaries: 50,000 Balls, Somay Ku: A Uganda Tennis Story and Behind These Walls. Somay Ku: A Uganda Tennis Story won the award for Best Documentary at the 2008 Malibu Film Festival and later debuted on the Tennis Channel. 50,000 Balls received official selections from the Rome International Film Festival and the Newport International Film Festival, won Best Documentary and Best Feature at the Northern California Film Festival, and debuted on ESPN Classic in June 2009.

== Run for Congress, 2012 ==
On August 18, 2011, Thayne announced his candidacy for Southern California's newly drawn 26th congressional district, a district that many political commentators believe will be a race between the Democratic nominee and the 26-year Republican incumbent Elton Gallegly, if he chooses to run. Two weeks before officially declaring his candidacy, Thayne added political consultant Garry South, named the "Carville of California" by The New York Times, to his campaign team as chief strategist.

In addition, prior to his run for office, he was known primarily just as David Thayne. However, in an attempt to sway the district's Latino demographic, he added the maiden name of his mother, "Cruz," to the name he was running under.
