= Academy for Math, Engineering, and Science =

Academy for Math, Engineering & Science

- AMES on the campus of Cottonwood High School in 2026

Location
- 5715 South 1300 East; Murray, Utah 84121; 40°38′50″N 111°51′10″W

Information
- Type: Public, charter
- Established: 2003
- Authorizer: Utah State Charter School Board
- Principal: Brett Wilson
- Teaching staff: 23.45 (FTE)
- Grades: 9-12
- Enrollment: 469 (2023-2024)
- Student to teacher ratio: 20.00
- Colors: Silver, black, and red
- Mascot: Amp-man
- Website: www.ames-slc.org

The Academy for Math, Engineering, & Science (AMES) is a public charter high school founded in 2003. AMES primarily focuses on a STEM based advanced curriculum and is recognized as one of Utah's best high schools.

AMES serves grades 9–12 in Murray, a suburb of Salt Lake City, Utah. AMES has a partnership with Granite School District, Salt Lake City District, and the University of Utah. As part of the AMES partnership with the University of Utah, the school offers a traditionally underserved high school student body a rigorous pre-college and concurrent curriculum, in a small high school setting.

AMES is a fully NAAS Accredited School as of 2004.

== Founding ==
AMES was founded in 2003 as part of a state initiative known as the New Century High Schools from former Governor of Utah Leavitt “ to give Utah high school students greater access and opportunities for advancement in specialized fields of study for a better Utah”. It is intended to be an alternative to the traditional type of high school, and as such AMES limits its enrollment to keep a "small school" environment and focuses on providing education all around the valley, and serving a diverse population. Due to AMES's focus on diversity, AMES reaches out to several cities around the Utah valley, providing education to all students and minorities. The school depends and offers buses to fulfil transportation needs. Total enrollment is capped at about 500 students.

The school opened with start-up funding from the Bill & Melinda Gates Foundation as part of their Early College High School Initiative. It receives ongoing financial support from the state of Utah as well as various corporate donors and charitable foundations.

AMES opened along with 6 other STEM Early Charter High Schools being funded by Bill & Melinda Gates Foundation around Utah. Other foundations, companies, organizations, and private donors have also contributed to AMES in every way they can including donations from Intel, the Olympics (donating Gateway computers during the 2002 Olympics), and other financial contributions towards AMES including state funding.

== Admission ==
Soon-to-be high school students, who are either invited to AMES or applied to the school are all admitted to the AMES lottery. Due to AMES's intended small environment to maintain an efficient student to teacher ratio, this method implies an unbiased decision on those who are accepted into joining. Students are sent an invitation through different methods, often through a letter in the mail, or by hearing about AMES and applying. In the past AMES had advertised through the media by broadcasting through the radio and selected television programs, AMES has also appeared in the local news, schedule meetings to and advocate the community about the school through libraries. Students who aren't picked for the opportunity to immediately attend are put on a waiting list to attend when a spot is available. Students are also eligible to attend if they have family members who are also attending AMES. If there is a family member who is about to leave AMES, any other member who is entering their 9th year may take their place at AMES as a student.

== Charter High School Ratings ==
Overall, the Academy for Math Engineering and Science has been ranked highly ever since establishment. As of currently it ranges, on average, to be top 10 in Utah's High School Rating. When AMES first started operating, it got quick media attention (specifically Deseret News) as one of the top 50 schools and has since then raised in ranks. AMES has an A+ letter grade and score in teaching and diversity, also boasting a 98% graduation rate.

Charter High School Rating
U.S. News & World Report	#6
Niche	#11
School Digger	#7

== Academic life ==
The Academy of Math, Engineering & Science has a total of 508 students, of which 239 are male and 269 female. The school maintains a Student-Teacher Ratio of 22.7: 1

Aside from the Sciences, Math, and Engineering curriculum, students are still offered debate and theatre programs/classes through Cottonwood High School. These classes include music, drama, driver's ed, sports, and more. The agreement does not allow Cottonwood students to take AMES classes, with the exception of Arabic. Cottonwood students have been able to test into AMES core classes.

AMES’ focus on Science enables students to partake in a Science Fair class as well as multiple extracurricular activities, with many students who participate receiving national merits and recognition. The Robotics programs of AMES include participation in the FIRST Robotics Competition, and VEX Robotics Competition through their Technology Student Association program. The AMES Robotics team's mascot is the Ampman, derived from an ampere.

The AMES Technology Student Association club was established in 2014, and received national recognition in 2015.

== Relationship with Cottonwood ==
AMES is located in the same building that houses Cottonwood High School but it is not part of Cottonwood High. Although the two schools are separate entities, they do have a class sharing agreement which allows AMES students to take Cottonwood classes not offered by AMES.

== University affiliation ==
AMES is partnered with the University of Utah. Students attending AMES are able to take University of Utah courses, taught in AMES classrooms by university professors, at the same time that they are completing their normal high school graduation requirements. University courses currently taught at AMES include calculus, physics, chemistry, college algebra, writing and humanities.

AMES is a free (publicly funded) high school and the university classes which students take while at AMES are also provided free of the normal university tuition charge. Enrollment is open to all students living anywhere in the Salt Lake Valley. Each year, new students are selected based on a random lottery from the applications received. Previous grades and test scores are not considered in the admissions process.

== Notable alumni ==
Rhyan White, 2020 Olympic Swimmer
