= City Center station (Utah Transit Authority) =

Light rail station in Salt Lake City, Utah, US

City Center
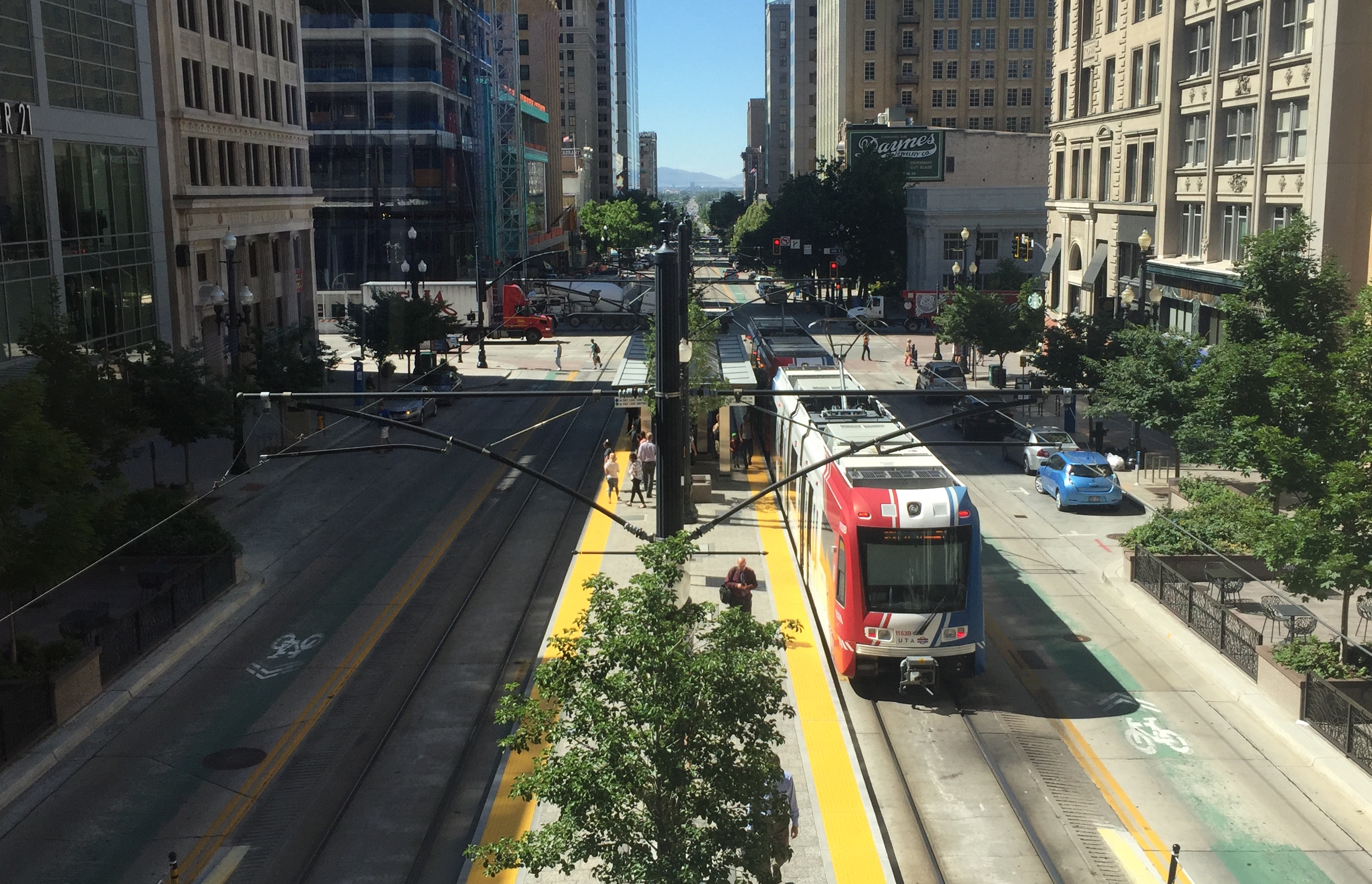
- A southbound train at City Center station, viewed from the City Creek Center skybridge

General information
- Location: 100 South Main Street; Salt Lake City, Utah; United States
- Coordinates: 40°46′07″N 111°53′28″W
- Owner: Utah Transit Authority (UTA)
- Platforms: 1 island platform
- Tracks: 2
- Connections: UTA: 1, 2, 4, 205, 209, 220; High Valley Transit: 107

Construction
- Structure type: At-grade
- Cycle facilities: Greenbike bikeshare station
- Accessible: Yes

Other information
- Fare zone: Free Fare Zone

History
- Opened: December 4, 1999; 26 years ago

Services
Preceding station	Utah Transit Authority	Following station
Temple Square toward Salt Lake Central	Blue Line	Gallivan Plaza toward Draper Town Center
Temple Square toward Airport	Green Line	Gallivan Plaza toward West Valley Central
Former services
Preceding station	Utah Transit Authority	Following station
Temple Square toward Salt Lake Central	University Line	Gallivan Plaza toward University Medical Center
Location

City Center station is a light rail station in Downtown Salt Lake City, Utah, in the United States, served by the Blue Line and Green Line of the Utah Transit Authority's (UTA) TRAX system. The Blue Line has service from the Salt Lake Intermodal Hub in Downtown Salt Lake City to Draper. The Green Line provides service from the Salt Lake City International Airport to West Valley City (via Downtown Salt Lake City).

== Description ==
The station is located at 100 South Main Street in the middle of the City Creek Center, with the island platform in the median of Main Street. It is the northernmost station on Main Street, the dividing line between the east and west quadrants of the city, and is situated between South Temple Street and 100 South. The station was opened on 4 December 1999 as part of the first operating segment of the TRAX system. and is operated by the Utah Transit Authority. The station is included in the Free Fare Zone in Downtown Salt Lake City. Transportation patrons that both enter and exit bus or TRAX service within the Zone can ride at no charge. Unlike many TRAX stations, City Center does not have a Park and Ride lot.

The station currently does not serve as a terminus, it did serve as the end of the Sandy and University lines during the 2002 Winter Olympics because Temple Square and Arena stations were within the Olympic Plaza.

Like the Salt Lake Intermodal Hub (as well as Gallivan Plaza and Library), there is a nearby Greenbike docking station. Greenbike is a bicycle-sharing system within Downtown Salt Lake City that allows members to pick up bicycles from any docking station and then drop it off at any docking station, ideally for trips of 30 minutes or less to avoid additional charges. Greenbike is seasonal and, depending on weather conditions, shuts down operations in November–December and starts up again in March–April.

== City Creek Center ==
In 2012, City Center Station became part of the core of the City Creek Center, one of the largest mixed-use, transit-oriented developments in Salt Lake City. Spanning three blocks between South Temple and 100 South, it transformed 23 acres (9 ha) of downtown real estate into a mixed-use complex with 700 residential units and 750,000 sq ft (69,677 m^{2}) of retail. A 2nd floor skybridge spans over the station platform.
