= The Regent (City Creek) =

Residential skyscraper in Salt Lake City, Utah, United States

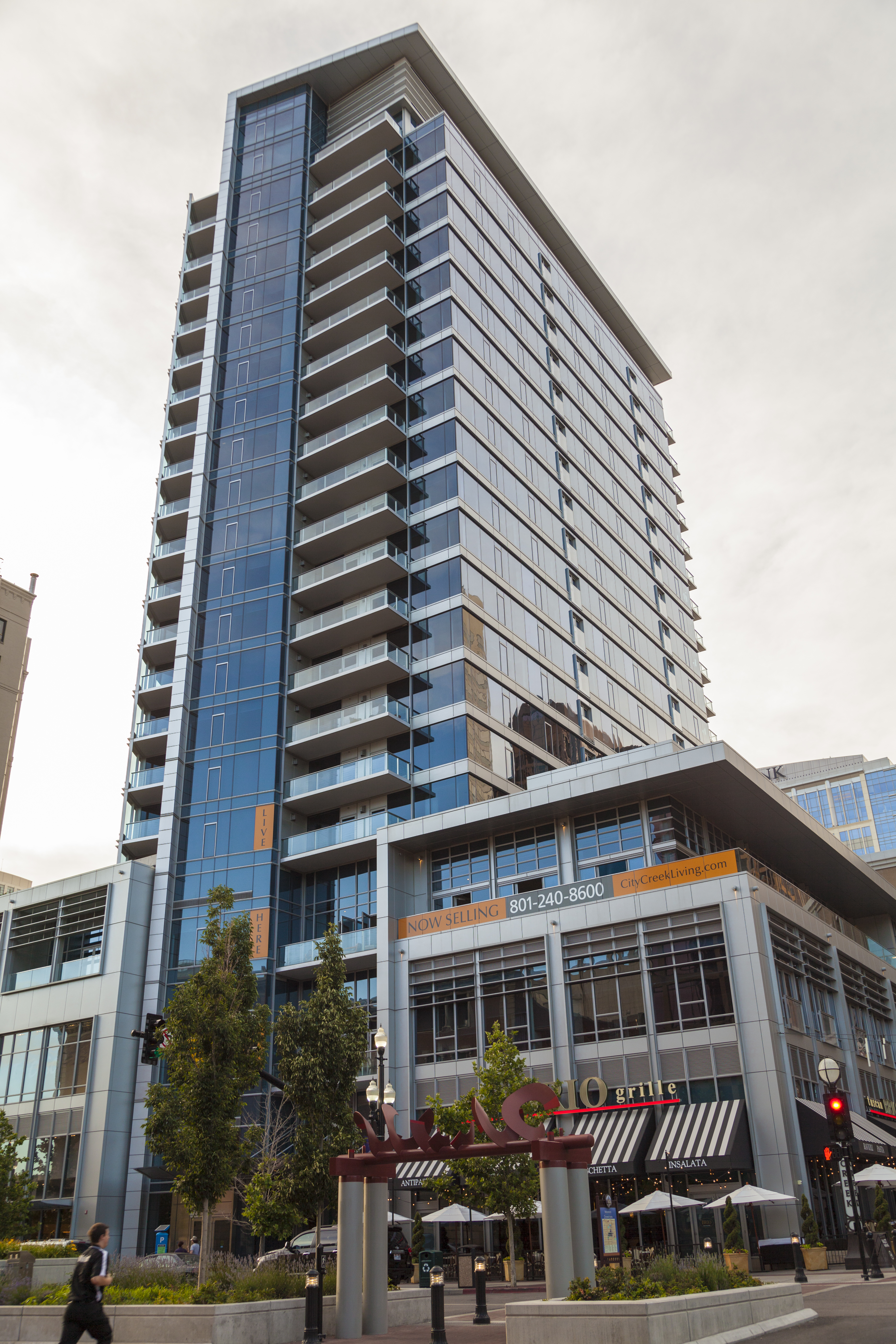
- The Regent as seen from 100 South street
- Interactive map of the The Regent area
- Former names: Tower 5
- Alternative names: The Regent at City Creek

General information
- Status: Completed
- Type: Residential
- Architectural style: Modernism
- Location: 35 East 100 South, Salt Lake City, United States
- Coordinates: 40.767582°N 111.890216°W
- Construction started: 2008
- Completed: September 2011
- Opened: October 1, 2011
- Owner: City Creek Reserve, Inc. (The Church of Jesus Christ of Latter-day Saints)

Height
- Height: 265 feet (81 m)

Technical details
- Material: Concrete
- Floor count: 20

Design and construction
- Architecture firm: Zimmer Gunsul Frasca Partnership
- Developer: City Creek Reserve, Inc. (The Church of Jesus Christ of Latter-day Saints)
- Structural engineer: Magnusson Klemencic Associates
- Services engineer: Colvin Engineering Associates
- Civil engineer: Glumac International Inc.
- Main contractor: Jacobsen Construction
- Awards: LEED Gold

Other information
- Number of rooms: 150 units
- Parking: Underground

The Regent is a residential condominium tower at City Creek Center in Salt Lake City, Utah. Opened in 2011, the 20-story, 150-unit building is LEED Gold certified and was designed by Zimmer Gunsul Frasca Partnership in a modernist style.

== History ==
=== Development ===
Early in the development of City Creek Center, this area was slated for a Dillard's department store and a resurrected Regent Street. Residents and the city government did not like the initial plan for the roadway, specifically that it did not align with the section of Regent Street across 100 South street. Developers agreed to realign the new portion of Regent Street, but that left insufficient space for Dillard's. In its place, a new residential tower, which would become The Regent, and a mini-anchor store which wraps around the First Security Bank Building were constructed. While the structure was under development, it was known as "Tower 5."

=== Construction ===
As the tower's location is midblock, an area which had a building-height limit of 100 feet (30 m), developers had to receive permission for the building to exceed that limitation. The city's planning commission approved the 265-foot (81 m) high building in January 2008. Pile driving for the structure began in October 2008.

Two cranes were used during the construction of the tower. After they were dismantled, there were still necessary items that were too large to fit into the elevators, so the contractor devised a pulley system to lift the items up to the balconies, after which they were brought inside through sliding glass doors.

It took the construction team six days to cast each floor of the tower; the project consumed a total of 22,634 cubic yards (17,305 m^{3}) of concrete. To lay the concrete a specially designed forming system was used.

Construction was completed in September 2011, and the building officially opened on October 1.

=== LEED Certification ===
During the construction of the skyscraper, a Silver LEED certification was achieved. Having a Silver certificate, the tower was only a few credits short of the prestigious Gold certification so the architects devised a solution to achieve the greater recognition.

== Design ==
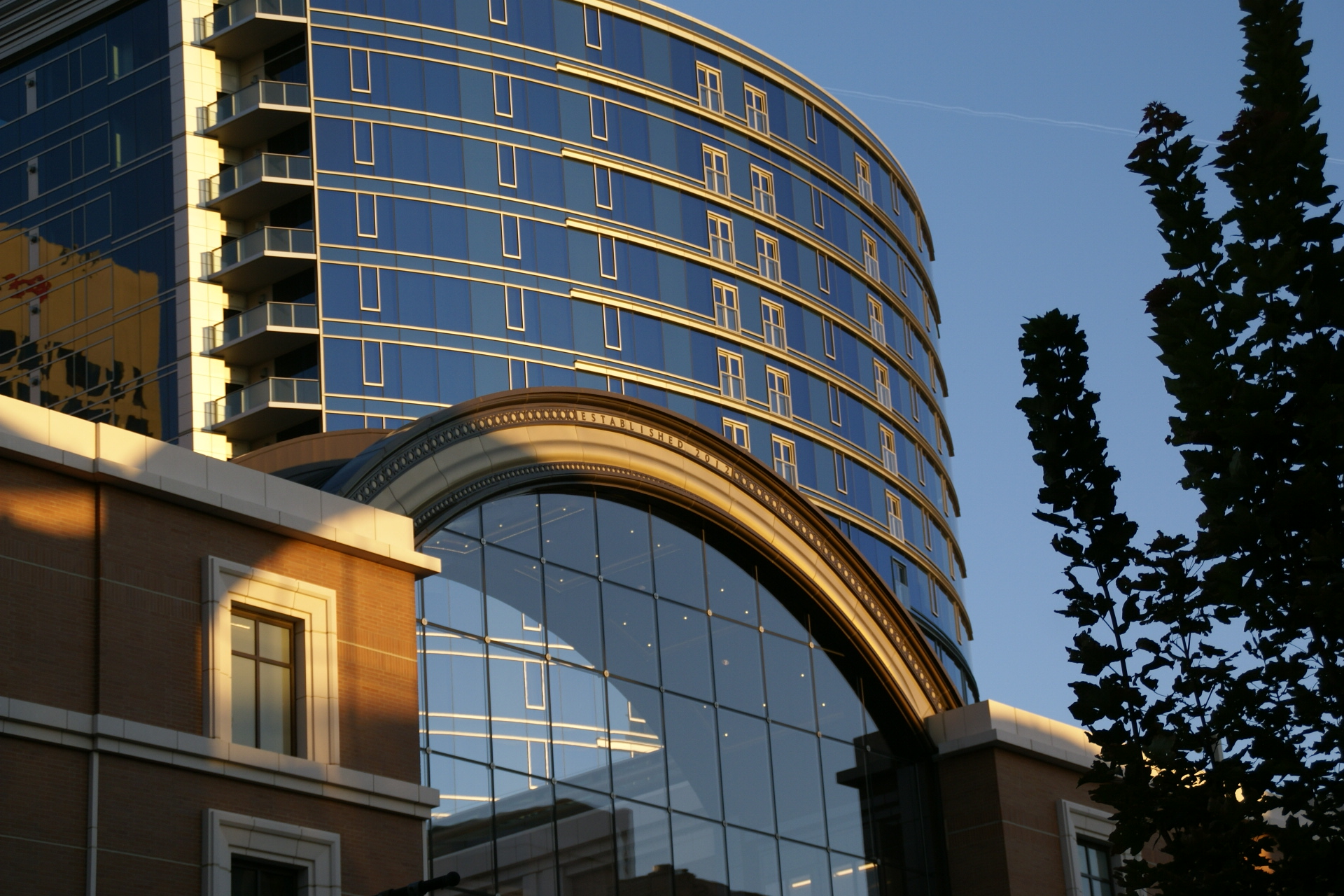
The tinted blue glass curtain walls of The Regent are visible above City Creek Center

=== Exterior ===
The skyscraper has 20 floors with underground parking.

The Regent is the only residential building at City Creek Center that was built in a modernist style. This style, in conjunction with tinted blue glass and balconies makes it one of the more unique residential skyscrapers in Salt Lake City.

=== Interior ===
The main lobby, like the tower, was built in a modernist style with glass curtain and crystal white walls.

Units range in size from 800 square feet (74 m^{2}) to 2,100 square feet (200 m^{2}); penthouse suites are included on the top floor. All residences have wooden floors, natural stone walls and countertops, and floor-to-ceiling windows with views of the city and nearby mountains. The third floor includes a pool, fitness center and entertainment rooms.

== See also ==
- 99 West on South Temple
- Richards Court
- City Creek Center
