= Temple Square station =

Light rail station in Salt Lake City, Utah, U.S.

Temple Square
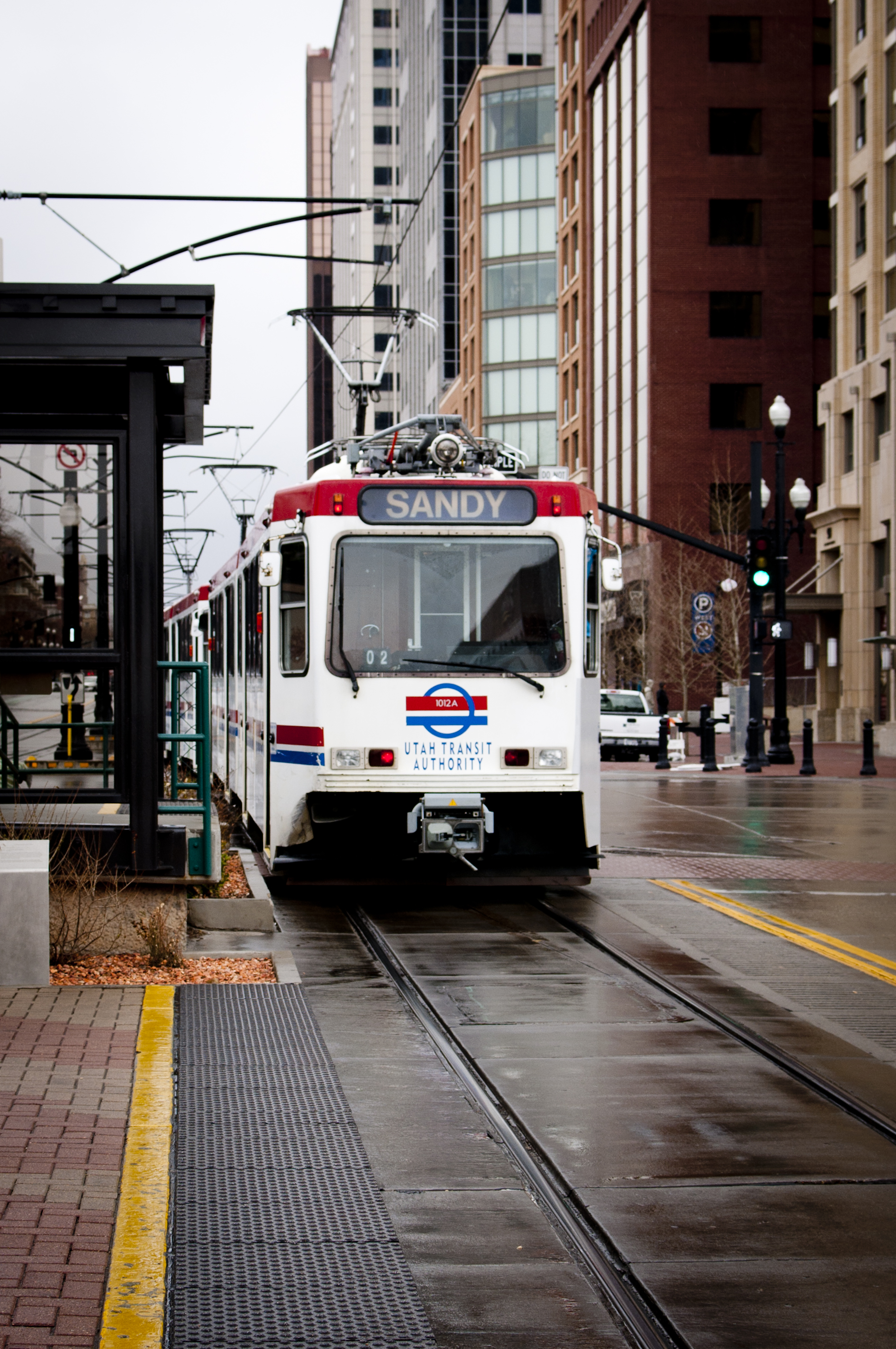
- Blue Line train at the Temple Square station platform

General information
- Location: 132 West South Temple; Salt Lake City, Utah; United States
- Coordinates: 40°46′10″N 111°53′45″W
- Owner: Utah Transit Authority (UTA)
- Platforms: 1 island platform
- Tracks: 2
- Connections: UTA: 1

Construction
- Structure type: At-grade
- Accessible: Yes

Other information
- Fare zone: Free Fare Zone

History
- Opened: December 4, 1999; 26 years ago

Services
Preceding station	Utah Transit Authority	Following station
Arena toward Salt Lake Central	Blue Line	City Center toward Draper Town Center
Arena toward Airport	Green Line	City Center toward West Valley Central
Former services
Preceding station	Utah Transit Authority	Following station
Arena toward Salt Lake Central	University Line	City Center toward University Medical Center
Location

Temple Square station is a light rail station in Downtown Salt Lake City, Utah, United States, served by the Blue Line and Green Line of the Utah Transit Authority's (UTA) TRAX system. The Blue Line has service from the Salt Lake Intermodal Hub in Downtown Salt Lake City to Draper. The Green Line provides service from the Salt Lake City International Airport to West Valley City (via Downtown Salt Lake City).

== Description ==
The station is located at 150 West South Temple, with the island platform in the median of the street. It is situated immediately north of the Salt Palace Convention Center and Abravanel Hall, just southwest of Temple Square, and just northwest of the new City Creek Center development. The station was opened on December 4, 1999, and was part of the first operating segment of the TRAX system. The station was closed during the 2002 Winter Olympics as it was within the Olympic Square. It is operated by the Utah Transit Authority. The station is included in the Free Fare Zone in Downtown Salt Lake City. Transportation patrons that both enter and exit bus or TRAX service within the Zone can ride at no charge. Unlike many TRAX stations, Arena does not have a Park and Ride lot.

All of UTA's TRAX and FrontRunner trains and stations, as well as all fixed route buses, are compliant with Americans with Disabilities Act and are therefore accessible to those with disabilities. Signage at the stations, on the passenger platforms, and on the trains clearly indicate accessibility options. Ramps on the passenger platform and assistance from the train operator may be necessary for wheelchair boarding on Blue Line (weekdays only). These ramps are not used on weekends or on the Green Line. In accordance with the Utah Clean Air Act and UTA ordinance, "smoking is prohibited on UTA vehicles as well as UTA bus stops, TRAX stations, and FrontRunner stations".
