= 99 West on South Temple =

Residential skyscraper in Salt Lake City, Utah, United States

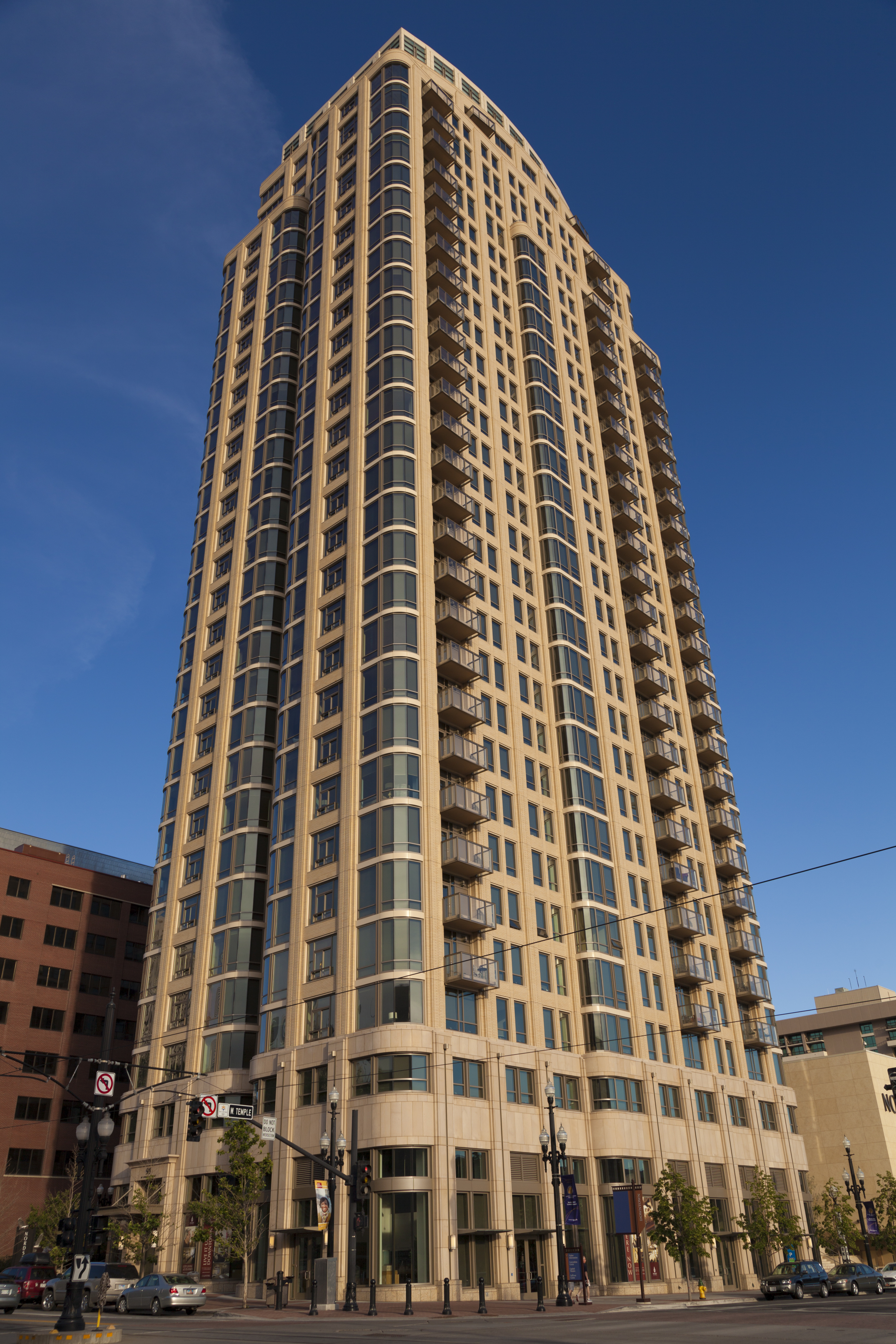
- 99 West on South Temple, July 2013
- Interactive map of the 99 West on South Temple area
- Former names: Tower 1, The Promontory on South Temple

General information
- Status: Completed
- Type: Residential
- Location: 99 West South Temple, Salt Lake City, Utah, United States
- Coordinates: 40.769054°N 111.893573°W
- Construction started: 2008
- Completed: 2011
- Owner: City Creek Reserve, Inc. (The Church of Jesus Christ of Latter-day Saints)

Height
- Roof: 375 feet (114 metres)

Technical details
- Floor count: 30
- Lifts/elevators: 3

Design and construction
- Architecture firm: Zimmer Gunsul Frasca Partnership
- Developer: City Creek Reserve, Inc. (The Church of Jesus Christ of Latter-day Saints)
- Main contractor: Okland Construction

Other information
- Number of rooms: 185 units
- Parking: Underground

Website
- https://www.99westhoa.com/

99 West on South Temple (commonly shortened to 99 West) is a residential condominium tower at City Creek Center in downtown Salt Lake City, Utah, United States. The 30-story, 185-unit building rises to a height of 375 feet (114 m), making it the sixth-tallest building in the city.

== History ==
99 West was built on the site of the Inn at Temple Square, which had recently been demolished. It was the first building at City Creek Center to start construction, with the concrete pour for its foundation beginning in March 2008. During development and construction, the tower was known as Tower 1 and The Promontory on South Temple. As construction wrapped up, the condos went on sale in February 2011 with move-in dates expected that spring.

In May 2019, the Utah Sports Hall of Fame opened a museum on the street level of the building.

== Design ==
The design of the 375 feet (114 m) tall residential skyscraper consists of a unique brick façade. 99 West is the tallest residential skyscraper in City Creek Center and the sixth-tallest skyscraper in Salt Lake City. Besides the residential floors, the street level contains retail space, and beneath the tower is underground parking. The building is LEED Gold certified.

== See also ==
- City Creek Center
- Richards Court
- The Regent
- List of tallest buildings in Salt Lake City
