= Stream of Life (sculpture) =

2012 bronze sculpture in Salt Lake City, Utah, U.S.

- The sculpture in 2021
- Artist: Rosetta.
- Year: 2012
- Medium: Bronze sculpture
- Dimensions: 426 cm (168 in)
- Location: Salt Lake City, Utah, United States; 40°46′5″N 111°53′22.6″W

Stream of Life is a 2012 bronze sculpture installed at Salt Lake City's City Creek Center, in the U.S. state of Utah. The artwork commemorates the state's wildlife and depicts several animals.

The original small model of the sculpture was made by Rosetta, of Rosetta Sculpture, which was then enlarged and recreated in foam by Gary DuChateau, using a 3-D pantograph. The mould was made up of 58 separate pieces, and the final sculpture was welded together. The sculpture is made of bronze, stainless steel, and stone.
