= 2002 Winter Olympics Countdown Clock =

Sculpture in Salt Lake City, Utah, U.S.

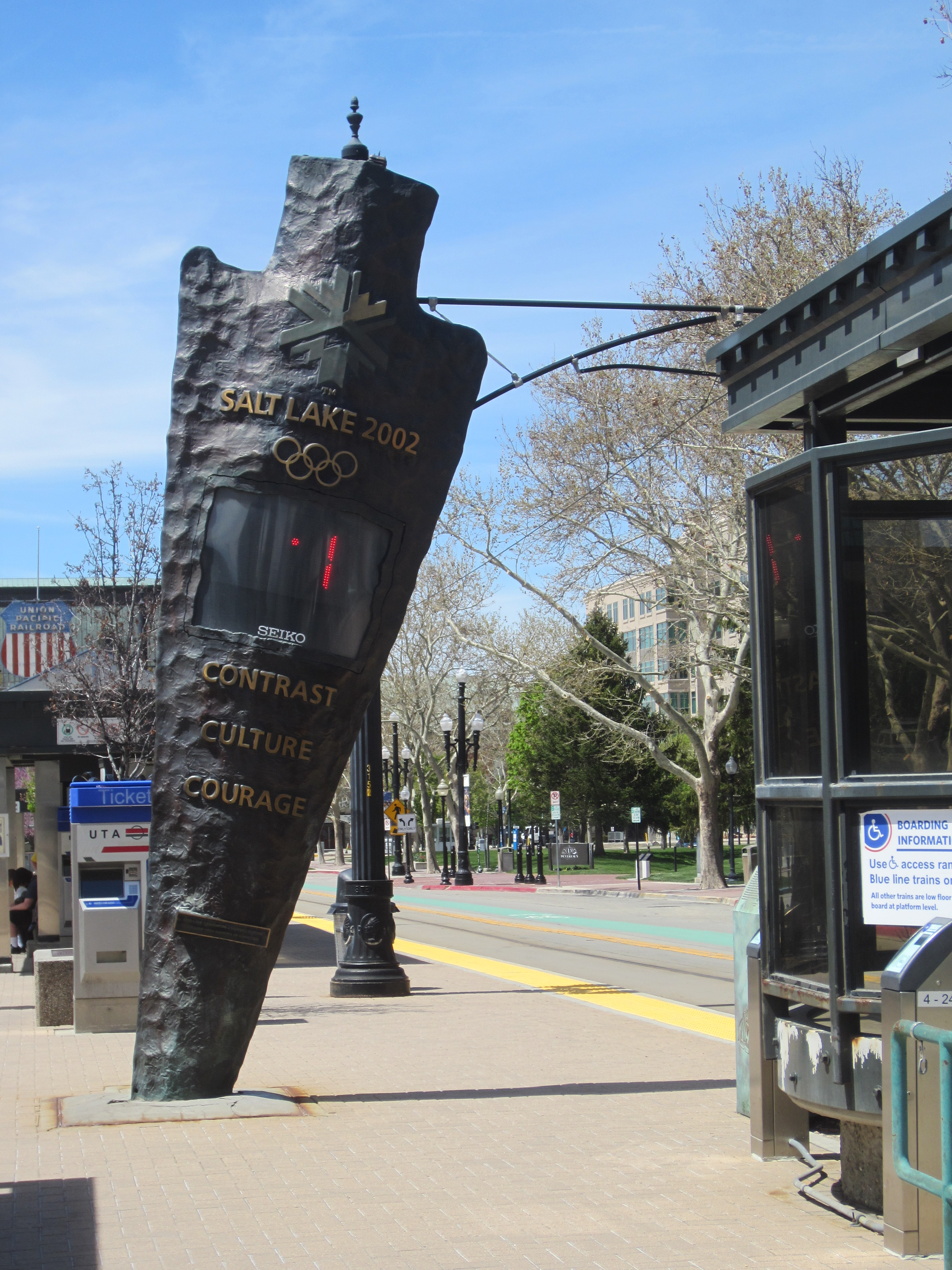
- The clock in April 2021
- Location: Salt Lake City, Utah, U.S.; 40°46′9.7″N 111°54′0.3″W

The 2002 Winter Olympics Countdown Clock is bronze sculpture installed in the TRAX Arena station in downtown Salt Lake City, Utah, United States. Unveiled on May 15, 2001, to count down to the 2002 Winter Olympics, the clock resembles an arrowhead to commemorate those found during construction of the station.
