= Cottonwood High School (Murray, Utah) =

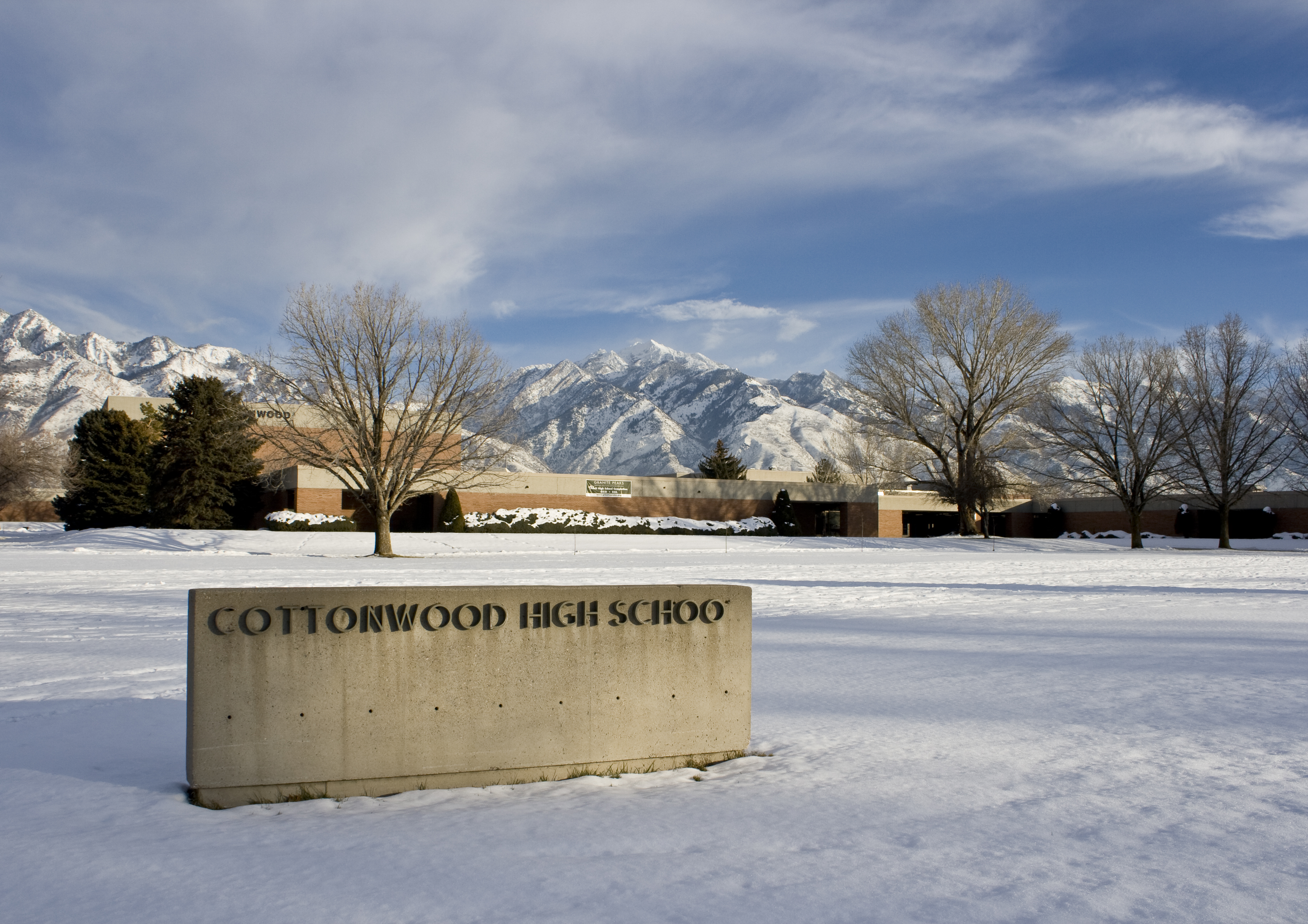

Location
- 5715 South 1300 East; Murray, Utah 84121; 40°38′50″N 111°51′08″W

Information
- Type: Public
- School district: Granite School District
- Superintendent: Ben Horsley
- Principal: Michael Douglas
- Staff: 65.46 (FTE)
- Grades: 9-12
- Enrollment: 1,495 (2023–2024)
- Student to teacher ratio: 22.84
- Colors: Black and gold
- Athletics conference: 4A, Region X
- Mascot: Colts
- Website: Official website

Cottonwood High School is a public high school located in Murray, Utah, United States. The current enrollment is nearly 1700 and is the most diverse school in the Granite School District, and one of the most diverse in the state of Utah. The school offers traditional schooling for grades nine through twelve. A portion of the building is also leased to Academy for Math, Engineering, and Science (AMES), a charter high school.

== History ==
The school opened its doors in 1970.

The school's mascot is the Cottonwood Colt and its colors are black, white and gold. Cottonwood High School is one of nine senior high schools in the Granite School District.

The building includes a large auditorium with a maximum capacity of just over 3,000. Because of the auditorium's size, it has been used for many concerts and public functions over the years. The annual production of Michael McLean's The Forgotten Carols is held in the auditorium each December. The facilities are used year-round for citywide events, such as political rallies, pageants, and various clubs and sports.

The building has a ring-shaped layout which includes an open-air courtyard, several atriums (including the lunch area), and gifts from graduating classes, the most visible of which are a bronze statue of a colt located near the lunchroom and the school's seal in tile work in the main foyer (gifted by Class of 2003 alum).

The campus also features a large field for soccer, three tennis courts, a football field, and an indoor gym used from basketball and volleyball games. various

== Athletics ==
Cottonwood high school has a variety of sports, several teams are region or state champions.

- Baseball (boys')
- Basketball (boys' & girls')
- Cheerleading (boys' & girls')
- Drill a.k.a. Chapparrals (Girls')
- Cross Country (boys' & girls')
- Football (boys')
- Golf (boys' & girls')
- Hockey (boys' & girls')
- Lacrosse (boys' & girls')
- The Biking of Mountains
- Soccer (boys' & girls')
- Softball (girls')
- Swimming (boys' & girls')
- Track & Field (boys' & girls')
- Tennis (boys' & girls')
- Ultimate Frisbee (boys' & girls')
- Volleyball (girls')
- Water Polo (boys' & girls')
- Wrestling (boys' & girls')

== Notable alumni ==
- Loren Allred, singer
- Gary Andersen, Head Coach, at Utah State University
- Cooper Bateman, former college football quarterback
- Klea Blackhurst, actress, Broadway and The Onion
- Josh Burkman, professional mixed martial artist
- Annette Cottle, volleyball player and coach
- Oliver Dunn, baseball player
- Richard Paul Evans, author and founder of the Christmas Box House International charity
- Charles Halford, actor
- Stanley Havili, professional football player
- Alejandra Ibáñez, 2020 Paralympic bronze medalist in women's wheelchair basketball
- David Litvack, Minority Leader in the Utah House of Representatives
- Lindsay Pulsipher, actress
- Chris Shelton, professional baseball player
- Will Swenson, actor and director
- David Cruz Thayne, small businessman; former chief of staff of Utah State Minority Leader Scott Howell; 2012 congressional candidate
- Tayler Wiles, professional cyclist for Trek–Segafredo (women's team)
- Joey Worthen, professional soccer player

== See also ==
- List of high schools in Utah
