= Marilyn McReavy =

American volleyball player (1944–2023)

Personal information
- Full name: Marilyn Louise McReavy
- Born: October 24, 1944; San Angelo, Texas, U.S.
- Died: April 13, 2023 (aged 78)
- Height: 183 cm (6 ft 0 in)
Medal record
Women's volleyball
Representing the United States
Pan American Games
Gold medal – first place	1967 Winnipeg	Team

Marilyn Louise McReavy (October 24, 1944 – April 13, 2023) was an American volleyball player. She played for the United States national team at the 1967 Pan American Games, the 1968 Summer Olympics, and the 1971 Pan American Games. She was born in San Angelo, Texas.

McReavy died on April 13, 2023, at the age of 78.
