= City Creek Center =

Shopping mall in Salt Lake City, US

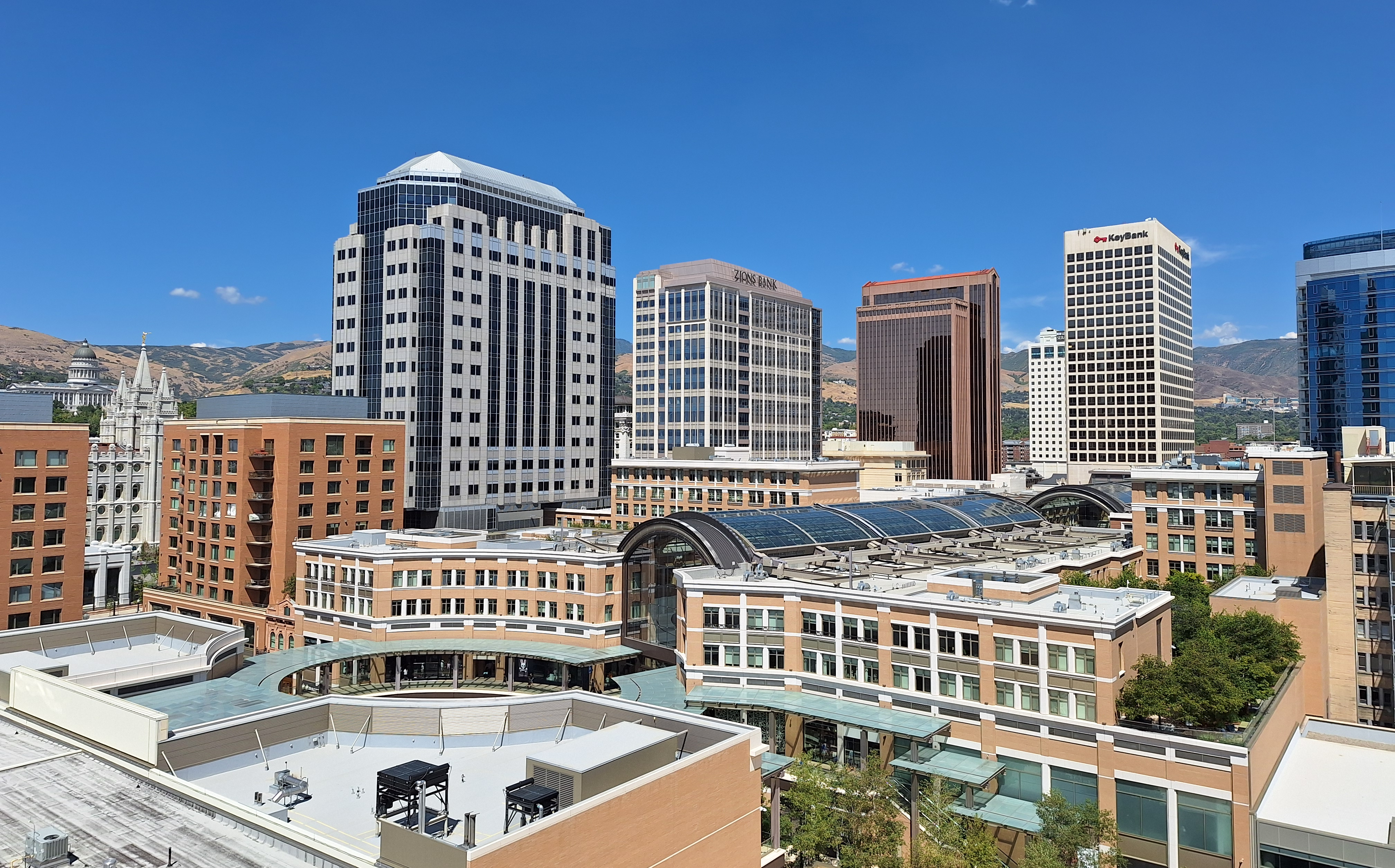
- City Creek Center and surrounding cityscape
- Location: Salt Lake City, Utah, United States
- Coordinates: 40°46′5″N 111°53′28″W
- Address: 50 South Main Street
- Opened: March 22, 2012; 14 years ago
- Developer: City Creek Reserve, Inc. & Property Reserve, Inc. (The Church of Jesus Christ of Latter-day Saints), Taubman Centers, Inc., Harmons Grocery Stores, Cowboy Partners LC, Hamilton Partners
- Owner: City Creek Reserve, Inc. & Property Reserve, Inc. (The Church of Jesus Christ of Latter-day Saints), Simon Property Group (formerly Taubman Centers, Inc.)
- Architect: ZGF Architects, Callison, Hobbs+Black Architects, FFKR Architects, SWA Group
- Num. of stores: 95+
- Num. of anchor tenants: 2
- Floor area: 890,000 square feet (83,000 m^{2})
- Floors: 2 (3 in Macy's, street level entrance in Nordstrom)
- Parking: 5,000+ underground spaces
- Public transit: City Center Station; Blue and Green lines (TRAX)
- Website: shopcitycreekcenter.com

City Creek Center (CCC), commonly shortened to City Creek, is a mixed-use development containing an upscale open-air shopping mall, grocery store, and office and residential buildings near Temple Square in downtown Salt Lake City, Utah, United States. Opened on March 22, 2012, the development encompasses over 23 acres (9.3 ha) across portions of three city blocks. The center's mall includes a foliage-lined walkway with a simulated stream, meant to recreate City Creek, an important water source for the early settlers of Salt Lake City.

Construction of the center was an undertaking by City Creek Reserve, Inc. (CCRI) and Property Reserve, Inc. (PRI), both commercial real estate entities of the Church of Jesus Christ of Latter-day Saints (LDS Church), and Taubman Centers, Inc. (TCI). The church's firms invested in the housing and parking elements of the mall, while TCI—since merged into Simon Property Group—owns and operates the shopping center itself. This partial religious ownership leads to the center being closed on Sunday, a unique situation among most malls.

== Design ==
The development features mixed-use residential, office, and 890,000 ft (270,000 m) of retail space. The mall area features two outdoor plazas, called Regent Court on the east block and Richards Court on the west block. Connecting the two plazas is the main walkway with a recreated stream in the center and retail space on either side. Although it is enclosed in galleria style, the main walkway features an open-air design with an award-winning retractable roof.

Incorporated into CCC are the façades of two historic former downtown buildings, the ZCMI Cast Iron Front and that of the Amussen Jewelry Building.

=== Landscape architecture ===
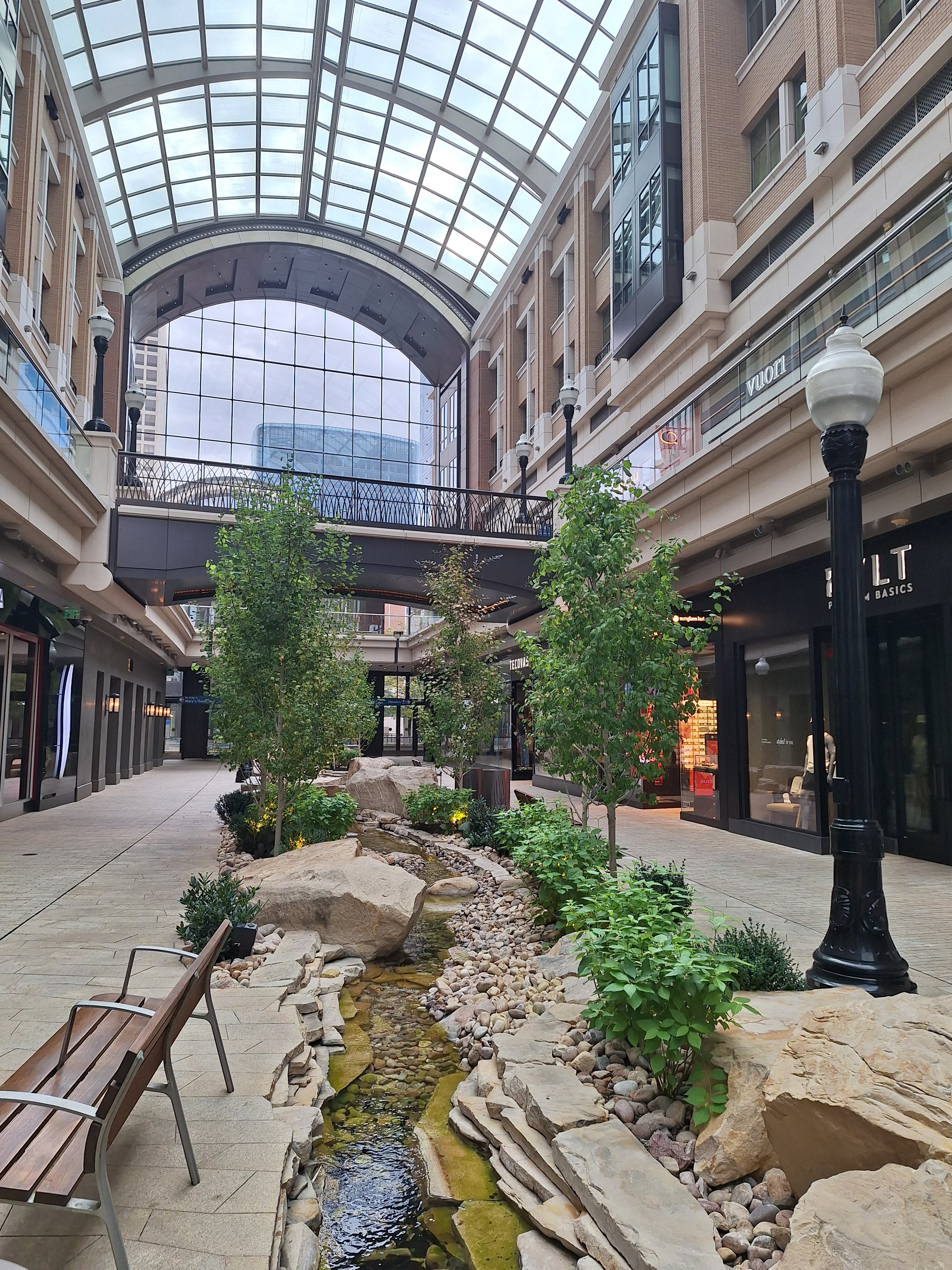
A recreation of City Creek running through the mall

SWA Group, which provided landscape architecture and urban design services, organized the development along the city's street-grid to keep CCC integrated to the urban fabric. They took inspiration from the area's original City Creek to create a 1,200-foot (370 m) long waterway, complete with waterfalls and boulders (meant to mimic streams in the surrounding Wasatch Range), traversing the property in the center of the main walkway. Unlike a similar recreation in nearby City Creek Park, the water in the mall's stream is not daylighted from the now-piped City Creek, but instead uses recirculated tap water. Besides the recreated creek, other water features include several fountains in Richards Court plaza. These fountains include the "Engage/Touch" splash pad, the "Transcend" fountain with music, lights, and water jets, and the "Flutter" fountain which combines water and fire. The fountains were created by WET Design, which had also designed Salt Lake City's Olympic cauldron for the 2002 Winter Olympics.

Other elements of the landscape design support the overall concept of urban living, with pocket parks, roof gardens, and landscape connections throughout the project. The multi-level walkways and plazas feature 6 acres (2.4 ha) of green space. Several of the walkways were added where streets had once been, before they were obliterated by development as Salt Lake City grew. Most prominent was Richards Street, which was closed and built over in the late 1970s when Crossroads Plaza was constructed; the Richards Street walkway on the west block of CCC reconnected South Temple and 100 South street for pedestrians.

=== Street crossings ===
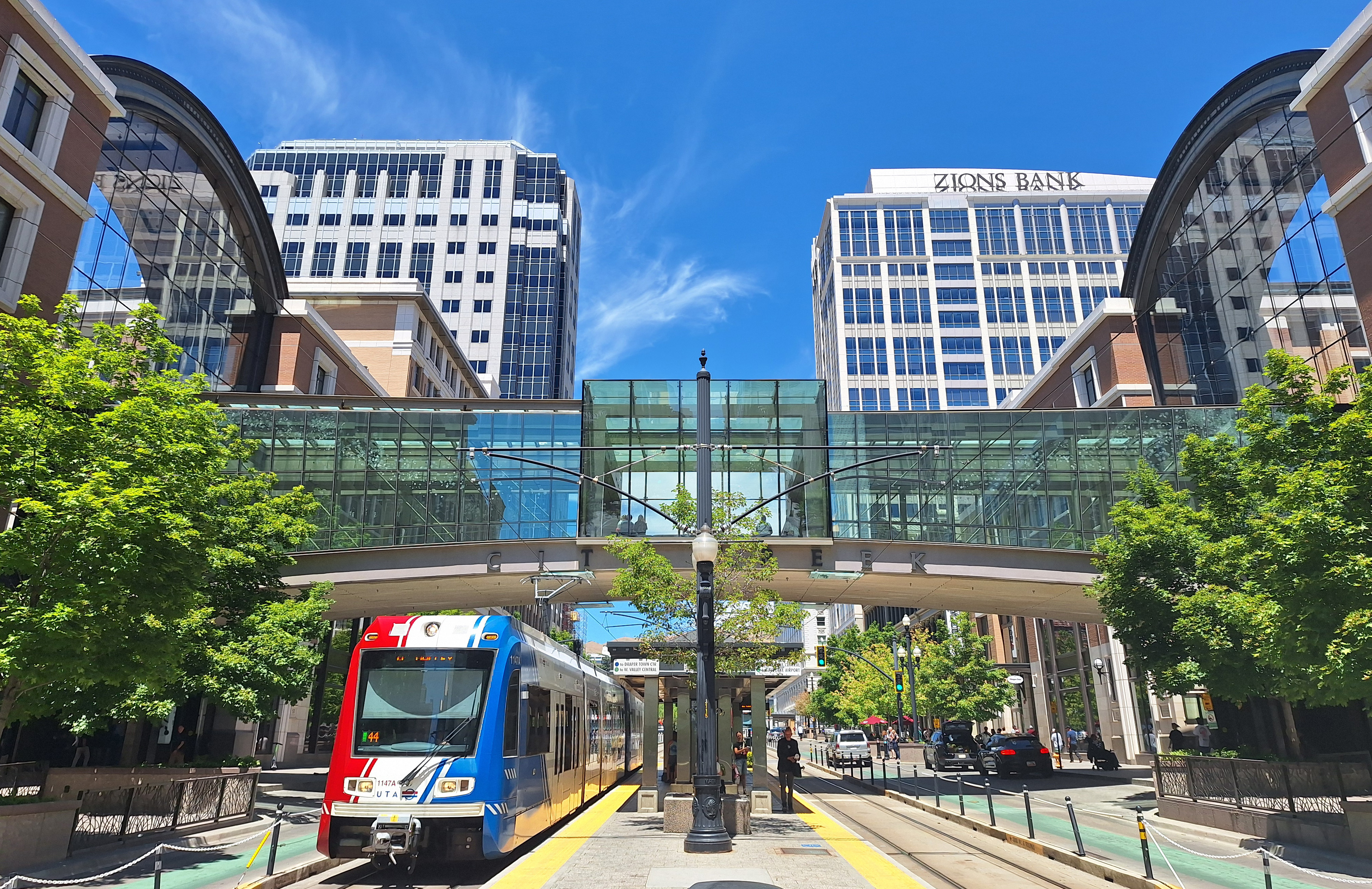
The skybridge at City Creek Center, as it crosses over Main Street

A skybridge connects the upper levels of the shopping center across Main Street. It weighs 320,000 pounds (150,000 kg) and includes roof panels that can be opened, along with etched glass walls and interior benches. The skybridge is located directly above the TRAX light rail station and was constructed by Jacobsen Construction.

"The Link at City Creek" is a tunnel (predating CCC) which runs beneath State Street at the site of Salt Lake City's former Social Hall, linking the eastern-most (3rd) block with the rest of the development.

=== Transportation and parking ===
The development is served by the City Center Station of Utah Transit Authority's TRAX light rail system.

CCC has 5,000+ parking spaces that are located in large garages under the development. The parking is mixed use, serving monthly, daily and residential use.

== Tenants ==
=== Retail ===
Anchor stores

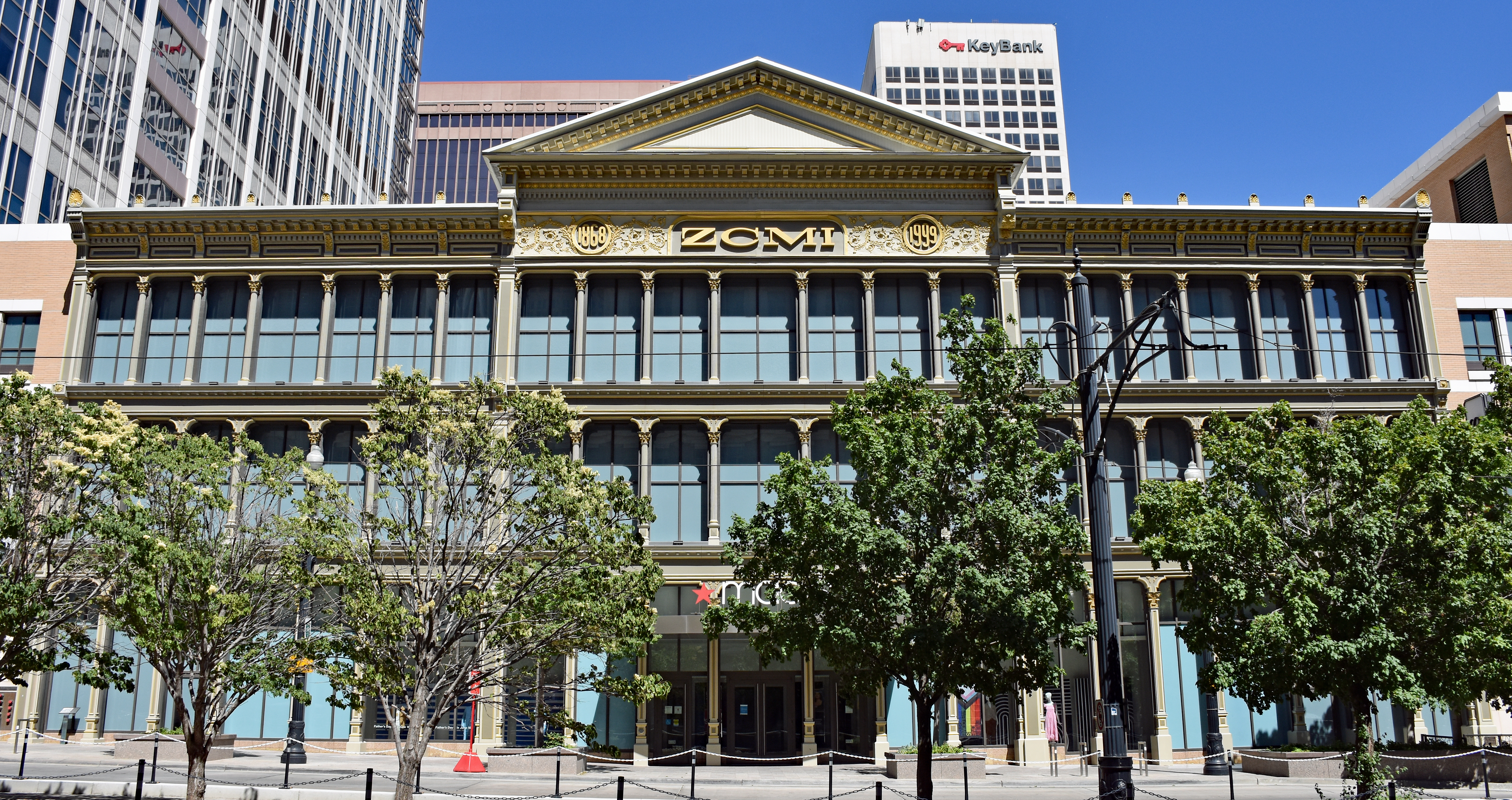
The historic ZCMI Cast Iron Front forms the façade of Macy's

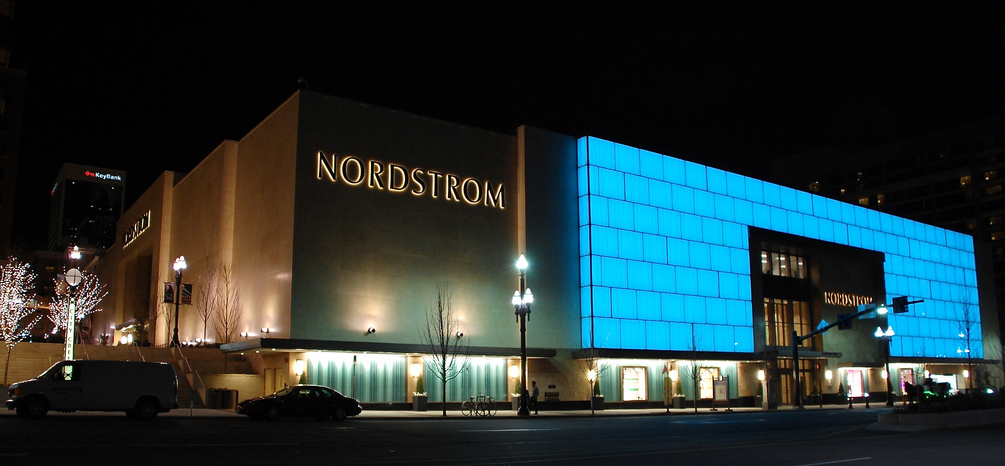
Nordstrom's West Temple entrance façade at night

CCC is anchored by two national department stores: Nordstrom and Macy's. Nordstrom has a two-level, 125,000 sq ft (11,600 m^{2}) store located on West Temple street, across from the Salt Palace Convention Center and Macy's occupies a three-level store of 155,000 sq ft (14,400 m^{2}), located on the block east of Main Street. There is approximately 300,000 sq ft (28,000 m^{2}) of additional retail space for specialty stores. A Harmons grocery store is located on the eastern-most (3rd) block, at the corner of 100 South and 200 East streets.

Among the first tenants of the mall were: The Disney Store, Tiffany & Co., H&M, Porsche Design, The Cheesecake Factory, and the flagship store of Deseret Book. As of 2024, a number of early tenants have left the mall, especially in the wake of the COVID-19 pandemic. Among those stores that have closed include: The Disney Store, Forever 21, The GYM, and Microsoft Store.

The food court is located near the northeast corner, in the lower level between KeyBank Tower and adjoining World Trade Center. Several eateries are located there, including Bocata, Chick-fil-A, McDonald's, Red Iguana, Sbarro.

=== Office ===
The Kirton McConkie Building, which houses the Kirton McConkie law firm, was the sole office building constructed in the initial phase of CCC. Two office towers have been built since CCC's opening, these are: 111 Main at City Creek and 95 State at City Creek.

Several existing office buildings were incorporated into the development, these are:

- First Security Bank Building
- Gateway Tower West at City Creek
- KeyBank Tower at City Creek (formerly the Beneficial Life Tower)
- World Trade Center at City Creek (formerly the Eagle Gate Plaza & Tower)
- 57 West South Temple (since demolished) (Note: This eight-story office building had originally opened in April 1957, as an annex to the Beneficial Life Building at the corner of Richards Street and South Temple street. While the Beneficial Life Building was demolished during construction of Crossroads Plaza, the annex structure remained. The headquarters of Deseret Book Company was moved into this structure as part of the development of CCC, while the street-level was home to Utah Woolen Mills. This building was damaged in the 2020 Salt Lake City earthquake, and was demolished in 2025.)

=== Residential ===
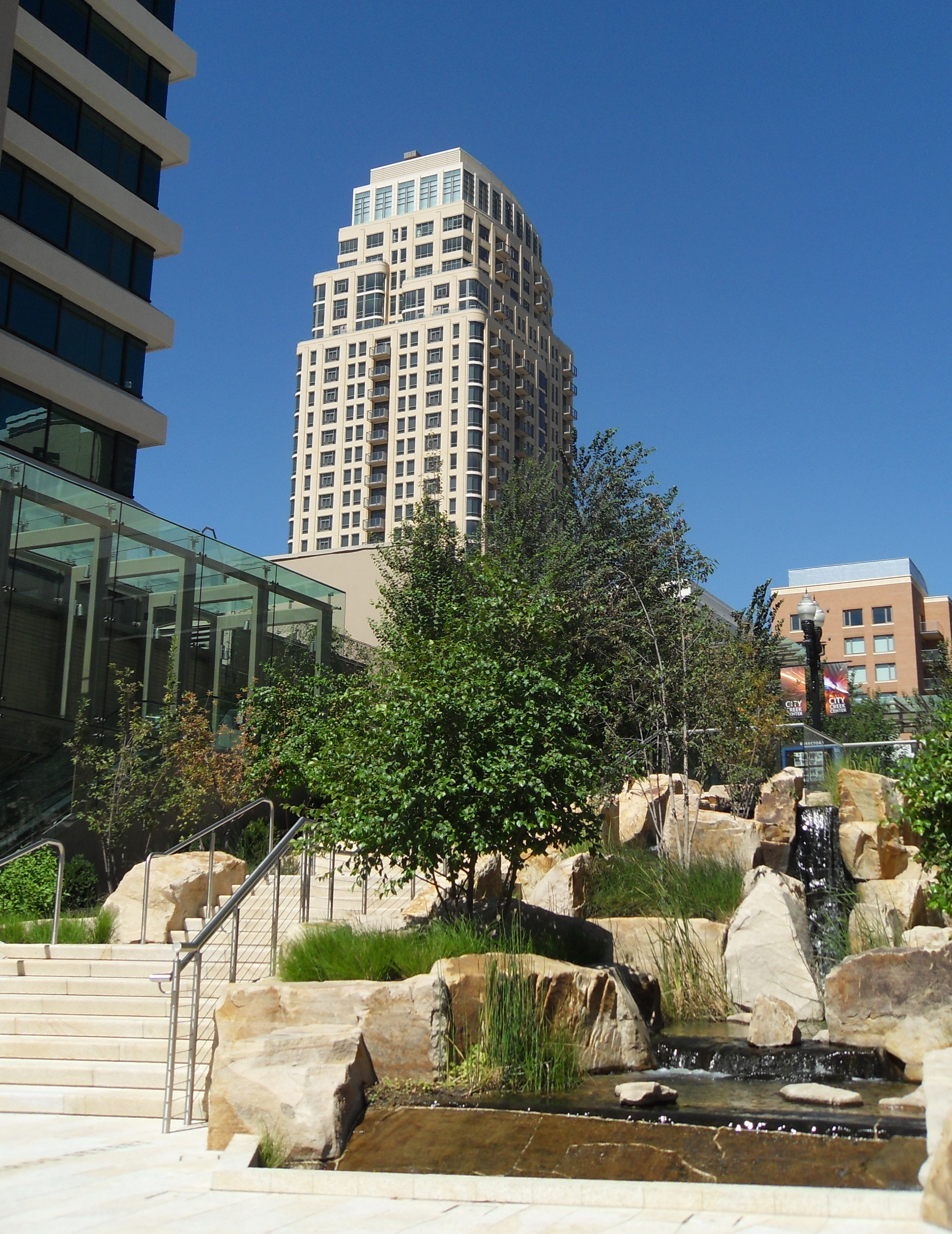
Southwest entrance to CCC, with the 99 West on South Temple condos in the background

There are approximately 700 housing units, consisting of condos and apartments, in CCC. The condos are located in one of four towers and the City Creek Landing apartments are located on levels above the west block retail shops.

The condo towers are:

- 99 West on South Temple, a 30-story tower
- Richards Court, consists of two 10-story towers
- The Regent, a 20-story tower
- The foundation and first three floors of the 19-story Cascade tower were built as part of the original construction. Plans call for completion of the tower when market conditions are right.

=== Hotels ===
The Salt Lake Marriott Downtown at City Creek is the only hotel located on the CCC blocks. (Note: Not officially part of the mall or owned by the same consortium.) The hotel predates the development, having been opened on October 15, 1981 by Marriott International. Originally connected to Crossroads Plaza mall, the hotel underwent a renovation and renaming when the block was redeveloped.

== History ==
=== Development ===
The LDS Church, via its various business interests, has long owned property adjacent to its headquarters campus and Temple Square. In 1975, the church had opened ZCMI Center Mall and in 2003, it acquired the neighboring Crossroads Plaza mall. By the early 2000s, these two malls (sometimes called the "Downtown Malls" or “Main Street Malls") were ageing and struggling with vacancies. In November 2001, a new open-air mall, called The Gateway, had opened in the downtown area. Located only four blocks west of Crossroads Plaza and ZCMI Center, The Gateway drew business away from Main Street and its malls.

In October 2003, soon after completing the purchase of Crossroads Plaza, the church presented preliminary plans to significantly remodel that mall and the neighboring ZCMI Center. Three years later, on October 3, 2006, the church announced more detailed plans regarding the development. These new plans would no longer preserve and remodel the two different downtown malls, but rather, would demolish them and build a single mall, known as City Creek Center. TCI had been brought in early during the development process to serve as a consultant to PRI during the planning and to manage retail leasing. One of the church's motives for the project was to protect Temple Square from urban decay.

=== Demolition and construction ===
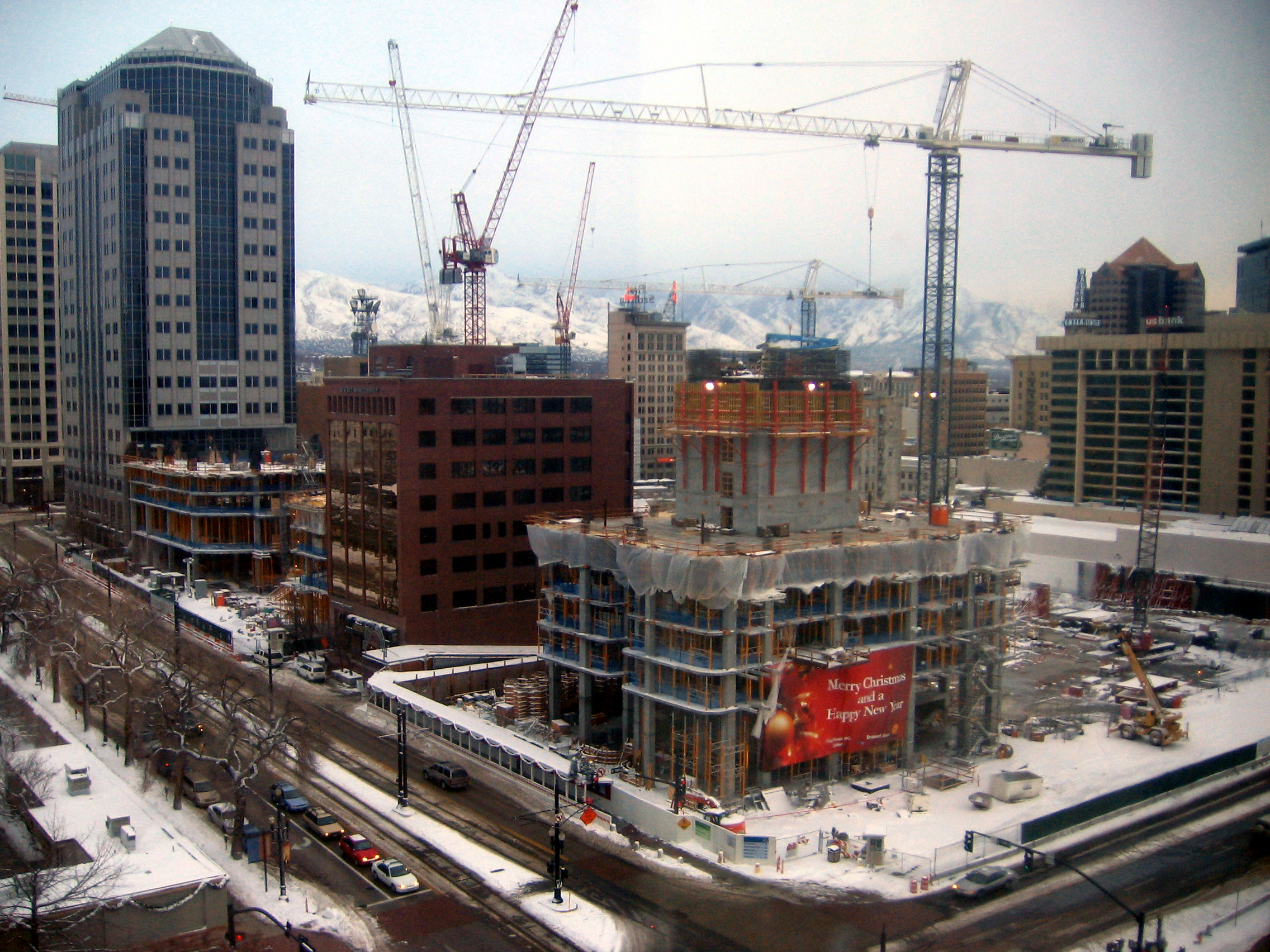
A view of the construction in December 2008, showing the west block with the core of the 99 West condo building visible

Demolition of the old malls and other structures commenced in November 2006, beginning with the Inn at Temple Square. The destruction proceeded across the site from west to east, with several businesses remaining open until a short time before their scheduled demolition. In January 2007, Crossroad Plaza's parking structure was torn down and in August of that year, the mall's Key Bank Tower was demolished via implosion. It was the last piece of Crossroads Plaza to be razed. Demolition of the ZCMI Center block began in summer 2007.

Preliminary approval from the city's planning commission allowed subsurface work to begin in early 2008, and the first concrete pour for a building occurred in March 2008, on what would become 99 West. The steel framework for the skybridge was placed in an overnight operation on March 21, 2010. Construction on the Harmons grocery store started in July 2010. A topping out ceremony, as the last steel beam was bolted into place for the center, was held in July 2010.

=== Plan adjustments ===
The Kirton McConkie building (at right) and surrounding stores

As plans solidified and public comments were made, there were adjustments made to the original proposals. Initial plans called for the demolition of the late-1910s First Security Bank Building. After public outcry over the planned demolition of the historic building, the church agreed to save the structure. Originally, a third anchor, Dillard's, was also planned for the mall. After public concern about the alignment of the restored Regent Street area, the street plan was modified, which then left insufficient space for Dillard's and the store was cancelled. This resulted in more space for other, smaller stores and the addition of another residential tower, which would become The Regent. What became the Kirton McConkie Building was known as Tower 4 during development and it was originally planned to be a residential structure, but after construction started, developers felt it better to change the building's use to commercial.

=== Opening ===
As construction progressed, some areas of the development opened prior to the 2012 grand opening. The food court opened on June 10, 2009. Deseret Book's flagship store opened on March 25, 2010. The first of the underground public parking garages opened in June 2011. Residents began moving into the Richards Court buildings in April 2010, while the other condos were finished the following year. Harmons grocery opened in February 2012.

Richards Court plaza

City Creek Center officially opened with a ribbon-cutting ceremony on March 22, 2012.

At the time of the development's opening, nearly $5 billion had gone into revitalization projects across downtown Salt Lake City; CCC itself has been estimated to have cost between $1.5 and $2 billion, $76 million of which was provided by TCI.

=== Continued operations ===
In 2020, the mall was closed from March 12 until May 6, due to the COVID-19 pandemic. A few weeks after reopening, during George Floyd protests in downtown Salt Lake City, windows were smashed at CCC and looters entered the mall, after which the Utah Army National Guard was called in to guard the center.

== Public sentiment ==
A number of critics opposed the skybridge, which was built to funnel shoppers across Main Street and through the development. The critics included merchants from nearby parts of the city, who expressed concern that the skybridge would divert traffic from street-level stores adjacent to the development. They stated a similar result had occurred thirty years prior, after the construction of ZCMI Center and Crossroads Plaza, during which longtime businesses such as Auerbach's and The Paris Company collapsed.

View of the Salt Lake Temple from City Creek Center

Some observers felt CCC was an inappropriate project for the LDS Church. They argued that the high investment in consumerism and promoting conspicuous consumption neglected religious principles, and instead suggested that funds would be better spent on community resources, welfare services, or humanitarian outreach. Others disagreed, saying the development brought jobs and beauty to the downtown, and the church had a duty to uplift properties near Temple Square and invest its private, commercial revenues. The church has stated that no tithing money was used for construction of CCC, with the project financed through the church's commercial real-estate arm, PRI. In 2019, a whistleblower from Ensign Peak Advisors, the church's investment firm, disputed this, alleging that the church had secretly transferred $1.4 Billion from funds set aside for charitable causes to the development during the 2008 financial crisis. The church was sued by a former member alleging fraud in relation to this matter, but the U.S. 9th Circuit Court of Appeals ruled unanimously that the church did not misrepresent the source of funds used for the project and no funds intended for charitable purposes were used, but that the project was funded by interest on invested reserve funds as stated by church leaders.

In 2008, the Sierra Club issued a report of environmentally responsible actions taken by communities of faith in each state. It cited the LDS Church's development of CCC as one of the 60 pilot projects selected to finalize the Leadership in Energy and Environmental Design – Neighborhood Development (LEED-ND) certification process.

== See also ==
- Stream of Life, sculpture at City Creek Center
