= State Street (Salt Lake County) =

Street in Utah, United States

- State Street, looking south from Salt Lake City's Capitol Hill
- Length: 17.3 mi (27.8 km)
- Location: Salt Lake County
- North end: Utah State Capitol Building
- South end: Draper, Utah

State Street is a wide 17.3-mile-long (27.8 km) street in Salt Lake County, Utah leading almost straight south from the steps of the Utah State Capitol Building, through Salt Lake City (including Downtown Salt Lake City), South Salt Lake, Millcreek, Murray (including the Murray Downtown Historic District), eastern Midvale, Sandy (including the Sandy Historic District and downtown Sandy), and northwestern Draper. Because it follows the most direct route from downtown Salt Lake City to the Point of the Mountain pass to Utah County, it was the undisputed main road south from Salt Lake City until Interstate 15 (I-15) was built to the west (but closely paralleling it). It retains the U.S. Highway 89 (US 89) designation for all but the northernmost seven blocks (which are part of State Route 186 (SR 186) instead) despite I-15's proximity. Due to its history as a route for long-distance travel, travel within the Wasatch Front region, and travel between the cities along the east side of the Jordan River, it has attracted a wide variety of retail and service businesses along its entire length, creating a nearly continuous commercial axis for the Salt Lake Valley.

== Route description ==
Other than along a portion of its length in Midvale and southern Murray that is currently (as of 2012) being rebuilt and widened to match the rest, the entire length of State Street south of South Temple has sidewalks on both sides and is a uniform six lanes in width plus either a center turn lane or (occasionally) a low median barrier. There is also local Utah Transit Authority bus service along the entire length of the street.

=== Draper ===
Modern State Street starts in Draper near I-15's exit 291 with a connection to Utah State Route 71 (12300 South). It intersects Utah State Route 175 (11400 South) on the border with Sandy.

=== Sandy ===
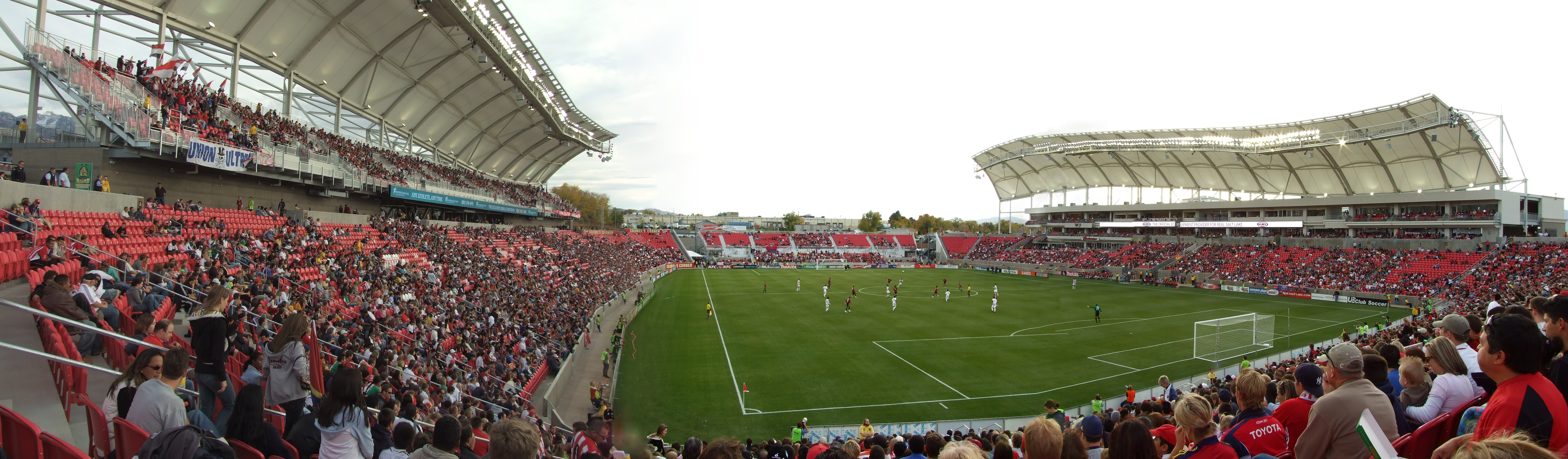
Just west of State Street, the Rio Tinto Stadium in Sandy

State Street continues north through the Crescent neighborhood, past the site of the historic Crescent Elementary School, and enters Downtown Sandy. It intersects 10600 South, which becomes State Route 151 a short distance to the west, and passes a large retail area that includes big box stores and the South Towne Mall. The street climbs a small hill to pass over the Jordan and Salt Lake Canal, then passes a cemetery and a small amount of undeveloped greenfield land near the crossing of Dry Creek before reaching a larger hill into which the East Jordan Canal is carved. At the top of this hill, the street passes west of Jordan High School and the South Towne Expo Center before intersecting 9400 South (former State Route 209). A short distance north of that intersection, the East Jordan Canal passes back under the street on its way toward Holladay, and Rio Tinto Stadium fronts onto the street on the west side. Just before the intersection with 9000 South (modern State Route 209), State Street passes the site of a former smelter (which now has a medical center built on part of it). The street forms the western boundary of the Sandy Historic District from 9000 South to Pioneer Avenue (8530 South), and several historic buildings face onto it in this area. There is a traffic signal it the intersection with Sandy's Main Street at 8720 South. North of the historic district, State Street passes through some relatively lightly developed land near the city's border with Midvale, though there are some townhouse developments in progress in the area.

=== Midvale ===
Soon after entering Midvale, State Street passes over the Jordan and Salt Lake Canal a second time and then quickly drops into a trench to pass under the UTA TRAX Blue Line. Upon rising up out of the trench again, it intersects 7800 South and a walkway leading west a short distance (along the south edge of the Midvale post office's facilities) to the Blue Line's Midvale Center station. A short distance north of this intersection is the intersection with Center Street (7720 South and previously State Route 48). The Greenwood Health Center of the University of Utah Healthcare system is on the east side of the street north of 7500 South (Greenwood Avenue). At Fort Union Boulevard (7200 South), State Street enters a denser commercial corridor with strip malls along a large portion of the route until the border with Murray and starts to curve very slightly to the east.

=== Murray ===
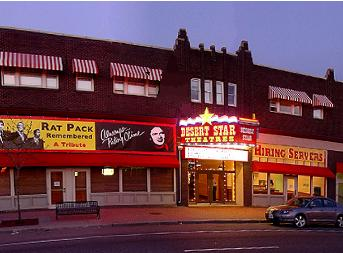
The NRHP listed Iris Theater is along State Street in Murray

State Street proceeds through most of Murray at an angle slightly off from its perfect north-south orientation elsewhere, moving 100 address units (660 feet, 200m) east over the span of about 2000 north-to-south address units (2.5 miles, 4 km). Similar to the northern end of Midvale's segment, State Street south of Interstate 215 in Murray is mostly surrounded by strip malls and a mixture of other small specialized retail businesses. After crossing Interstate 215 (where there is an eastbound-only on- and off-ramp pair), State Street intersects Winchester Street (which connects to the westbound ramps) and passes west of the Fashion Place Mall. Various big box stores line the street near the mall, and the Orthopedic Specialty Hospital (TOSH, previously Cottonwood Hospital) is just to the east of State Street on 5900 South. Between 5900 South and 5300 South, there is a concentration of car dealerships. Murray High School and Hillcrest Junior High School (not to be confused with Hillcrest High School) are on opposite sides of the street south of 5300 South (State Route 173) and are connected by a pedestrian bridge. North of 5300 South, State Street passes the Intermountain Medical Center (built on the site of the Murray Smelter) and Murray Park before crossing Little Cottonwood Creek and entering the Murray Downtown Historic District.

Within Murray's downtown area, State Street passes Murray's city hall and the Murray Theater before intersecting Vine Street (former State Route 173). It passes the Desert Star Theater, the Warenski-Duvall Commercial Building and Apartments, and other traditional zero-setback buildings with ground floor retail while running just west of the Murray Downtown Residential Historic District, then intersects 4800 South (former State Route 174, also known as Murray-Holladay Road east of State Street and Murray-Taylorsville Road west of State Street) less than two blocks north of the Vine Street intersection.

Beyond that, the surroundings revert to lower density development (including many car dealerships) before State Street intersects 4500 South (State Route 266) and approaches the crossing of Big Cottonwood Creek. Near the creek and the boundary of Millcreek Township, the street passes east of transit-oriented development around the Murray North light rail station and then the Murray Laundry Tower, a multi-story high concrete cylinder of Art Deco design with a vertically oriented sign reading "Rain Soft Artesian Water Murray Laundry" on top.

=== Millcreek Township ===
Millcreek Township's short portion of State Street includes a mixture of small-scale retail and car dealerships similar to the adjacent parts of Murray and South Salt Lake. It enters South Salt Lake at the intersection with 3900 South.

=== South Salt Lake ===
Just inside the boundaries of South Salt Lake, State Street passes the world's first Kentucky Fried Chicken franchise, which is on the west side of the street. The location is still a KFC restaurant, but the original building has been replaced with a new one. A few blocks north of that is the Avalon Theater. South of 3300 South (State Route 171), there is a Chinatown-themed development. State Street crosses Mill Creek at approximately 3000 South and then passes a combined Granite School District elementary school and administration building located in a former hospital at around 2500 South. State Street provides access to I-80 at I-80's exit 124. South Salt Lake's city hall is just to the east of State Street in this area, on the south side of I-80. Beyond I-80, State Street crosses the S Line (formerly known as Sugar House Streetcar) right-of-way and passes through an area with many disused industrial buildings that is planned for redevelopment in connection with the streetcar project.

=== Salt Lake City ===
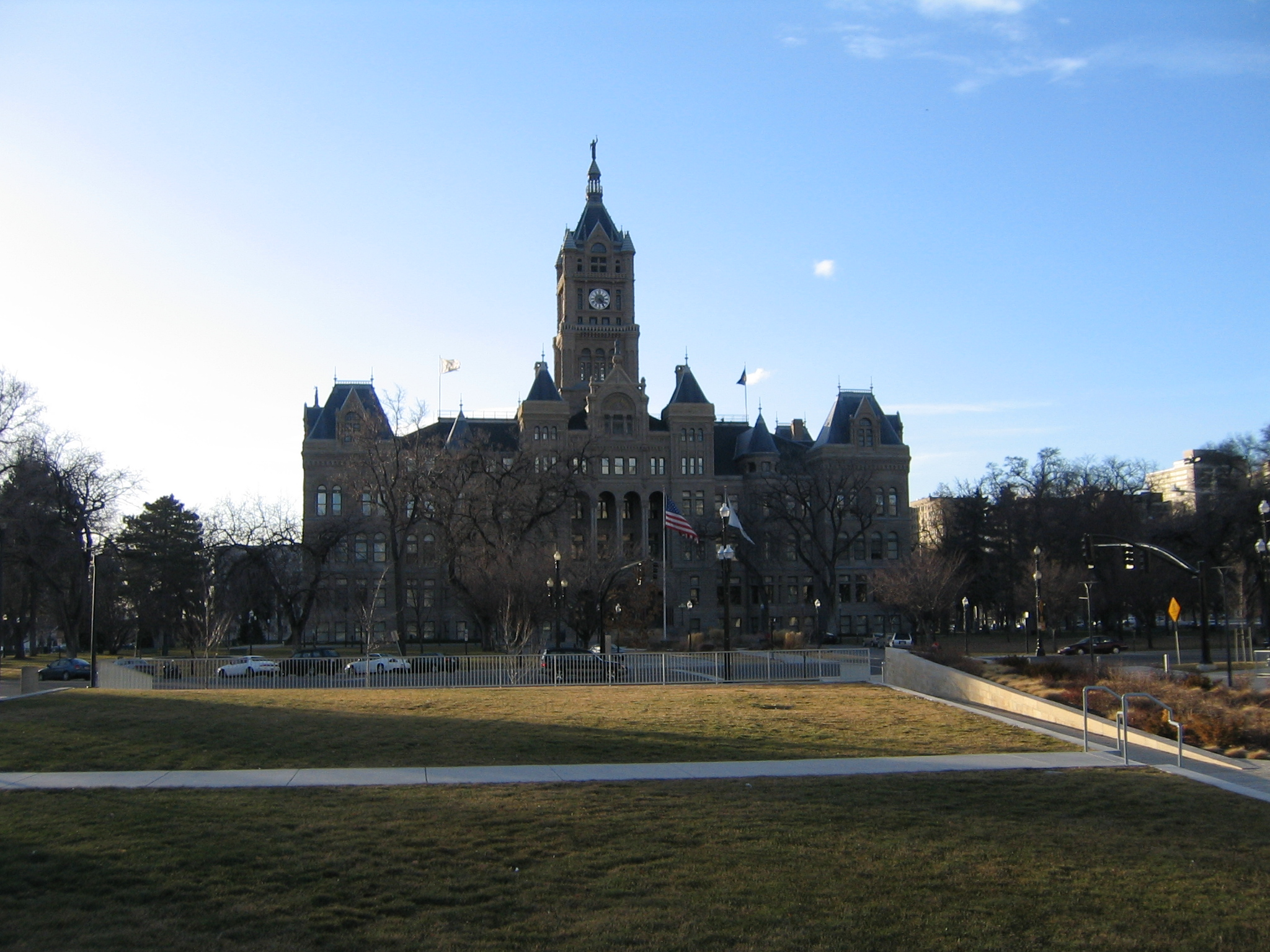
State Street passes to the west of the Salt Lake City and County Building

State Street enters Salt Lake City at 2100 South (State Route 201) and immediately passes west of the Salt Lake County Government Center. North of 1700 South, it passes west of a Salt Lake Community College campus built around the former South High School and then passes west of the Liberty Wells neighborhood. North of 900 South (former State Route 176) State Street has traffic signals every block, which is a change from the long signal spacings (often a half-mile or more) that benefit long-distance traffic further south. Outside of the somewhat similar Murray Downtown Historic District, the frontage from 700 South to 600 South is unique within State Street's length due to its uninterrupted mix of zero-setback pre-war-style buildings. 500 South and 600 South (both State Route 269) are one-way streets that provide access to and from I-15, respectively. Between 500 South and 400 South, State Street passes between the Scott Matheson State Courthouse and Washington Square, site of the City and County Building. The UTA TRAX Red Line crosses State Street in the median of 400 South. 400 South is also where US Highway 89 turns west to bypass the core of downtown; State Street north of 400 South as well as 400 South west of State Street have the State Route 186 designation instead.

The area northwest of the 400 South intersection is the Exchange Place Historic District, and the middle of the block northwest of the 300 South (Broadway) intersection is the Gallivan Center. Between 200 South and South Temple, State Street passes the Federal Reserve Salt Lake City branch building, the Wallace F. Bennett Federal Building, City Creek Center, the former Hansen Planetarium building, and the World Trade Center at City Creek. State Street is spanned by the Eagle Gate just north of South Temple, next to the Beehive House and Brigham Young Complex. The LDS Church Office Building is at the southwest corner of State Street's intersection with North Temple (100 North and previously the route used by US-89 to leave the core of downtown). City Creek disappears underground near this intersection, at the sites of City Creek Park and Brigham Young Historic Park. Beyond North Temple, State Street suddenly narrows and begins climbing Capitol Hill. State Street ends two blocks later at the steps leading to the Utah Capitol Building. State Route 186 continues by turning west on 300 North, then quickly north again to eventually reach US Highway 89 northwest of Capitol Hill.

== Addressing ==
South of Murray, State Street is closely aligned with the north-south axis of the Salt Lake County addressing system (essentially the Salt Lake Meridian). In Murray, however, it gradually diverts eastward before coming into alignment with 100 East (that is, it moves eastward by about 660 feet, which is Salt Lake City's block width). North of Murray, Main Street runs along the north-south axis of the addressing system instead. This does not cause much confusion for people looking for businesses along State Street since most businesses have addresses of the form "#### South State Street" (rather than something involving the name of a side street) due to State Street's recognizability; however, there are exceptions to this, mostly in downtown Murray, and residential addressing adheres strictly to the north-south axis, so it is not always easy to determine what side of State Street an address in Murray of the form "x East y Street" is on when x is between 0 and 100.

As with all north-south streets in Salt Lake County, odd-numbered addresses that are south of South Temple are on the east side of State Street, while north of South Temple, odd-numbered addresses are on the west side.

== History ==
State Street north of Vine Street in Murray was used as part of the route for wagons carrying quartz monzonite quarried at the mouth of Little Cottonwood Canyon for use in building the Salt Lake Temple, until railroads provided an easier route. Streetcars also extended south along the street as far as Murray in the early 20th century.

When the U.S. Highway system was unveiled in 1926, state street carried US-91 through the Salt Lake Valley. In the 1930s, US-89 was extended, using State Street. US 91 was truncated in 1974, however, State Street remains signed as US 89 today.

State Street originally continued south of its current terminus along the route now used by I-15: it continued straight south along the Salt Lake Meridian until turning to run along the Utah Southern Railroad right-of-way, which is now owned by the Utah Transit Authority (UTA) and proposed for use in phase two of the UTA's TRAX Blue Line, around Point of the Mountain. Beyond Point of the Mountain, it connected directly to Utah County's State Street. From the time that I-15 was built until around the year 2000, State Street's vehicle lanes connected directly to I-15 at the point at which I-15 came into alignment with the Salt Lake Meridian, but this north-south-only connection was eliminated as I-15 was rebuilt in favor of an omnidirectional exit at SR-71 just to the south because of increasing development on all sides.

In 1983, City Creek flooded and a large part of its flow was redirected down State Street as far as the storm drains of Red Butte Creek's watershed near 1300 South.

== Major intersections ==
The entire route is in Salt Lake County.

Location	mi	km	Destinations	Notes
Draper	0.0	0.0	US 89 south / SR-71 (12300 South)	Southern terminus; roadway continues south as Minuteman Drive. US-89 becomes concurrent northbound
Sandy	1.3	2.1	SR-175 west (11400 South)	Eastern terminus of SR-175
Sandy	4.3	6.9	SR-209 (9000 South)	
Midvale	6.6	10.6	SR-48 (7200 South)	Eastern terminus of SR-48
Murray	7.3	11.7	I-215 (Belt Route)	Interchange
Murray	9.0	14.5	SR-173 west (5300 South)	Eastern terminus of SR-173
Murray	10.3	16.6	SR-266 (4500 South)	
South Salt Lake	12.0	19.3	SR-171 (3300 South)	
South Salt Lake	13.3	21.4	I-15 north / I-80 west to SR-201 west – West Valley City, Reno I-15 south – Las Vegas	Interchange, locally known as the Spaghetti Bowl; I-15 north / I-80 west ramp also provides access to 2100 South (SR-201), 1300 South and 900 South
South Salt Lake	13.3	21.4	I-80 east – Park City, Cheyenne	
Salt Lake City	13.8	22.2	SR-201 west (2100 South)	Eastern terminus of SR-201
Salt Lake City	15.9	25.6	SR-269 east (600 South)	One-way pair
Salt Lake City	16.1	25.9	SR-269 west (500 South)	One-way pair
Salt Lake City	16.2	26.1	US 89 north / SR-186 east (400 South)	US-89 turns west, State Street becomes concurrent with SR-186
Salt Lake City	17.3	27.8	SR-186 west (300 North)	Northern terminus; SR-186 continues west along 300 North
1.000 mi = 1.609 km; 1.000 km = 0.621 mi: Route transition

== See also ==
- Main Street (Greater Salt Lake City), Salt Lake City's most important commercial street, which runs parallel to State Street just one block west
- Redwood Road (part of State Route 68), the closest equivalent to State Street on the west side of the Jordan River
- Utah State Route 106, which in most places follows the oldest road leading north from Salt Lake City
- Suzaku Boulevard, the concept of a great street leading to the seat of government from the south, as applied in historic Japanese city planning

== External references ==
Media related to State Street (Salt Lake County) at Wikimedia Commons
