= Murray Downtown Residential Historic District =

Historic district in Utah, United States

- U.S. National Register of Historic Places
- U.S. Historic district
- Houses in the historic district

- Location within Utah Location within the United States
- Location: Roughly bounded by East 4800 South, East Clark Street, East Vine Street, and Center Street; Murray, Utah; United States
- Coordinates: 40°39′59″N 111°52′59″W
- Area: 20 acres (8.1 ha)
- Built: 1870
- Architectural style: Late Victorian Style/Art Moderne
- NRHP reference No.: 04001566 (original); 100005563 (increase)

Significant dates
- Added to NRHP: January 25, 2005
- Boundary increase: November 5, 2020

The Murray Downtown Residential Historic District is the best representative area of the residential settlement and development of the city of Murray, Utah, United States. It was listed on the National Register of Historic Places in 2005. It is locally significant as a physical reflection of its residential architecture and the historic development of the city from its agricultural beginnings through its industrial era and current status as a small suburban city. The buildings within the district represent the wide range of architectural styles and plans popular in the city and the state of Utah between 1870 and 1954 and retain a high degree of integrity.

== Description ==
The buildings are significant because they are the best depiction of the historical development of the historic central downtown residential section of Murray, and contain a high concentration of historical resources. South State Street (US-89) was the business center of Murray from the 1880s until the 1950s and many of the retail merchants, professionals and business people lived just blocks from their places of business on State Street. The variety of architectural styles in the historic district represent most of the historical eras of Murray and the majority of the buildings serve as good examples of their intended style. The district area is the most historically intact residential section of Murray. The buildings are concentrated in a compact area with little infill and maintain a cohesive historic streetscape.

Soon after settlers from the Church of Jesus Christ of Latter-day Saints came into the Salt Lake Valley in 1847, families began to settle to the south around the streams. The area now incorporated as the City of Murray was part of the land to the south of Salt Lake City known as South Cottonwood. Unlike the Salt Lake City example to the north, development in Murray was not based on the Plat for the City of Zion plan (with settlement in a grid pattern around a town square). Early settlement was distributed with families living on their agricultural lands on the sides of Big Cottonwood Creek and Little Cottonwood Creek. Farming was self-sufficient, primarily raising grain to support the family and the livestock. The Atwood family historic brickyard, located to the south of Vine Street, where the ballpark in the Murray City Park is currently found, most likely provided the bricks for many of the early public buildings and residences in the historic district. Early architecture from this period would have been simple vernacular Classical examples. However, no structures from this era are known to exist in the historic district.

The residents of the Murray Downtown Residential Historic District in this era were retail merchants, small businessmen, civic leaders, service workers, and professionals who lived with their families close to their businesses or offices on State or Vine Streets. An early commercial center grew up at the intersection of State and Vine Streets, the major north-south and east-west thoroughfares surrounding the historic district. A few residents had their businesses located at their houses. Donald O. Wilson was a broom maker at 4911 Center Street and Katie Wilson was a nurse at 4873 Wasatch.

Thomas Martin opened his general merchandise store on State Street in 1914, close to his residence at 187 East 4800 South. Chester P. Cahoon of the Salt Lake Pressed Brick Company lived directly east at 183 East 4800 South. The Brinton family, owners of Brinton Electric Company, a dealer in retail electrical appliances from 1922, lived at 433 East Vine Street. Nearby Ernest and Eugenia M. Madsen, proprietors of the family store Madsen Hardware and Furniture, lived on 401 East Vine Street. Charles Caldwell, Jr., built a house for his family at 5000 Glen Street, and opened "The Palace Market" at 4800 South and State Street. Heber B. Smith was Secretary of the Miller-Cahoon Implement Company before he opened Smith's Hardware on the southwest corner of 4800 South and State Street. He lived with his wife, Fern Smith, at the house he built in 1912 at 195 East 4800 South.

Medical professionals and educators also chose this area to live and raise their families. Dr. Herond Nishan Sheranian lived at 259 East 4800 South from 1922 to 1933, just blocks from his Murray Hospital Clinic founded in 1927. He emigrated with his family as a child from Turkey in 1902 and worked briefly in a Murray smelter to help with medical school expenses. A chiropractor, Dr. G. H. Pace, lived nearby at 389 East 4800 South. Dr. Frank McHugh who treated Industrial Workers of the World activist Joe Hill for his gunshot wound and surrendered him to police also lived near the district.

Elmo E. Boggess was a school principal and lived with his wife, Mary Ann, at 271 East 4800 South. The superintendent of schools for Murray from 1912 to 1928, Carl E. Gaufm emigrated with his family from Sweden as a child and graduated from the University of Utah in 1896. He was known for establishing the first high school in Murray and lived with his wife, Rhoda, at 218 East Vine Street. After his death his widow housed schoolteachers who were living there to meet the residence requirement for Murray teachers. The locally renowned musician Morris Cannegeiter who directed the Olympus Male Choir lived at 398 East Vine Street.

Politicians, including two mayors and a judge built houses in the district. Charles Brown was mayor of Murray from 1906 to 1909 and lived at 215 East 4800 South. He operated the Buster Brown store and later the Palace Meat Market. George Huscher was the first Socialist mayor of Murray from 1912 to 1915 and lived with his wife, Elizabeth, across the street at 264 East 4800 South. Utah Supreme Court Chief Justice David W. Moffat built the brick four-square in 1908 at 288 East Vine Street. He was an attorney and later judge for the Utah Supreme Court. His wife, Sarah Howe Moffat, helped to establish the Murray library and served on the Murray Board of Education.

Three churches remain from this era in the historic district, and in all cases the original congregation has changed. The first church built, the LDS Murray First Ward Meetinghouse, is evidence of the LDS population found at that time in Murray. It was built in 1907 at 184 East Vine Street. It was heavily used and enlarged in 1928. It has been occupied since the 1970s by the Mount Vernon Academy, a non-denominational school for pre-kindergarten to grade 12 children. The other two churches were built by other religious groups, showing Murray's early relatively cosmopolitan nature due to the diverse population drawn to employment in the smelters. They are both still used for worship. The St. Vincent de Paul's Catholic Church was built in 1927 at 4900 Wasatch Street and is now owned by the Maronite Catholic Church Bishop of the Diocese of St. Maron. The Methodist Episcopal Church at 171 E. 4800 South was built c. 1915 and is now a Quaker Church.

The wartime and postwar need for housing also led to remodeling single family houses to create apartment spaces. The 1908 two-story foursquare (box) at 4928 Wasatch was shared with officers needing housing from the Kearns Army Air Base during the war and in 1950 was converted into two apartments. An external closed stairway to the second floor was added to the c. 1895 Victorian Eclectic cross-wing house at 205 East Vine Street during a conversion of the single-family house to apartments in 1951.

== See also ==
- Murray Downtown Historic District
- Murray, Utah
- National Register of Historic Places listings in Salt Lake County, Utah
- Vine Street (Murray, Utah)
