= John P. Cahoon House =

Historic house in Utah, United States

- U.S. National Register of Historic Places
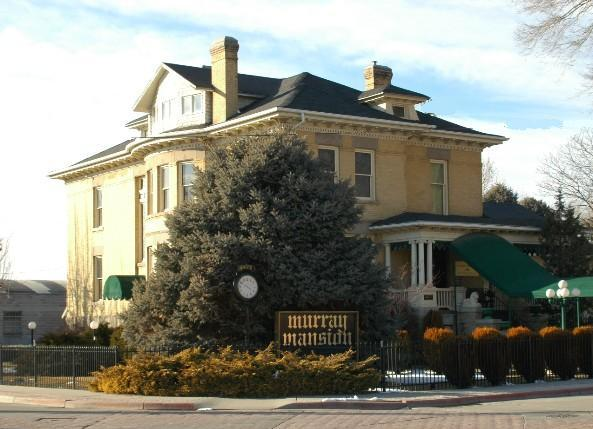
- John P. Cahoon House in Murray, Utah

- Location within Utah Location within the United States
- Location: 4872 South Poplar St., Murray, Utah
- Coordinates: 40°39′56″N 111°53′22″W
- Area: 1 acre (0.40 ha)
- Built: 1900
- Architectural style: Victorian
- NRHP reference No.: 83003186
- Added to NRHP: March 3rd, 1983

The John P. Cahoon House is a historic home in Murray, Utah, United States. The house is listed on the National Register of Historic Places as a significant example of residential Victorian Eclecticism in Murray and as the home for over twenty years of John P. Cahoon, a pioneer in the brick industry in Utah and the western United States.

The large, 2 1/2-story brick house referred to in 1902 as "easily the finest home in the county outside Salt Lake City," has remained virtually unchanged since its construction around 1900. Although its Victorian styling is more subdued than that found on many houses in Salt Lake City, this house represents the fullest expression of "high style" architecture, in its community, where the: housing stock consists, mainly, of smaller scale, modestly ornamented cottages.

The home has since been purchased and restored by Bill and Susan Wright in the 1980s. It currently is christened the Murray Mansion and functions as a reception center that is coupled with a small chapel next door to handle complete weddings. It has also been included in the Murray Downtown Historic District.

== John P. Cahoon ==
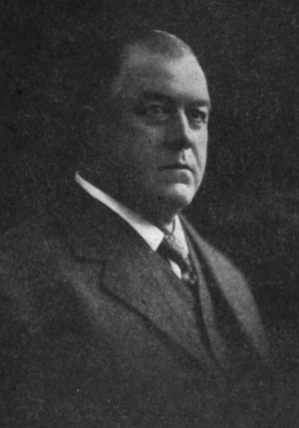

John P. Cahoon was the principal founder of what is claimed to be the first commercial brick manufacturing plant in both Utah and the western United States in 1878. Brick played an especially important role in the construction business in Utah because of the scarcity of readily available lumber, and by the start of the 20th century there were several dozen companies competing in the brick manufacturing industry. Under John P. Cahoon's leadership, his company, incorporated in 1891 as Salt Lake Pressed Brick Company, emerged as one of the most successful in the industry, and Cahoon himself made important contributions to the industry.

He was appointed to the War Service Committee on Brick in Washington, D.C. in 1918, and served as an organizer and vice president of the Brick Manufacturers Association of America. Also, under his leadership, his company started the first trade school program in Utah, teaching bricklaying to students. Interstate Brick Company, as it was renamed in 1939, has become the largest company of its kind in the Intermountain West.
