= Big Cottonwood Creek =

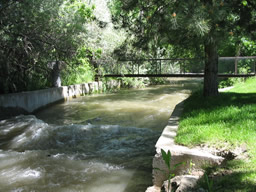
- Big Cottonwood Creek near Big Cottonwood Park

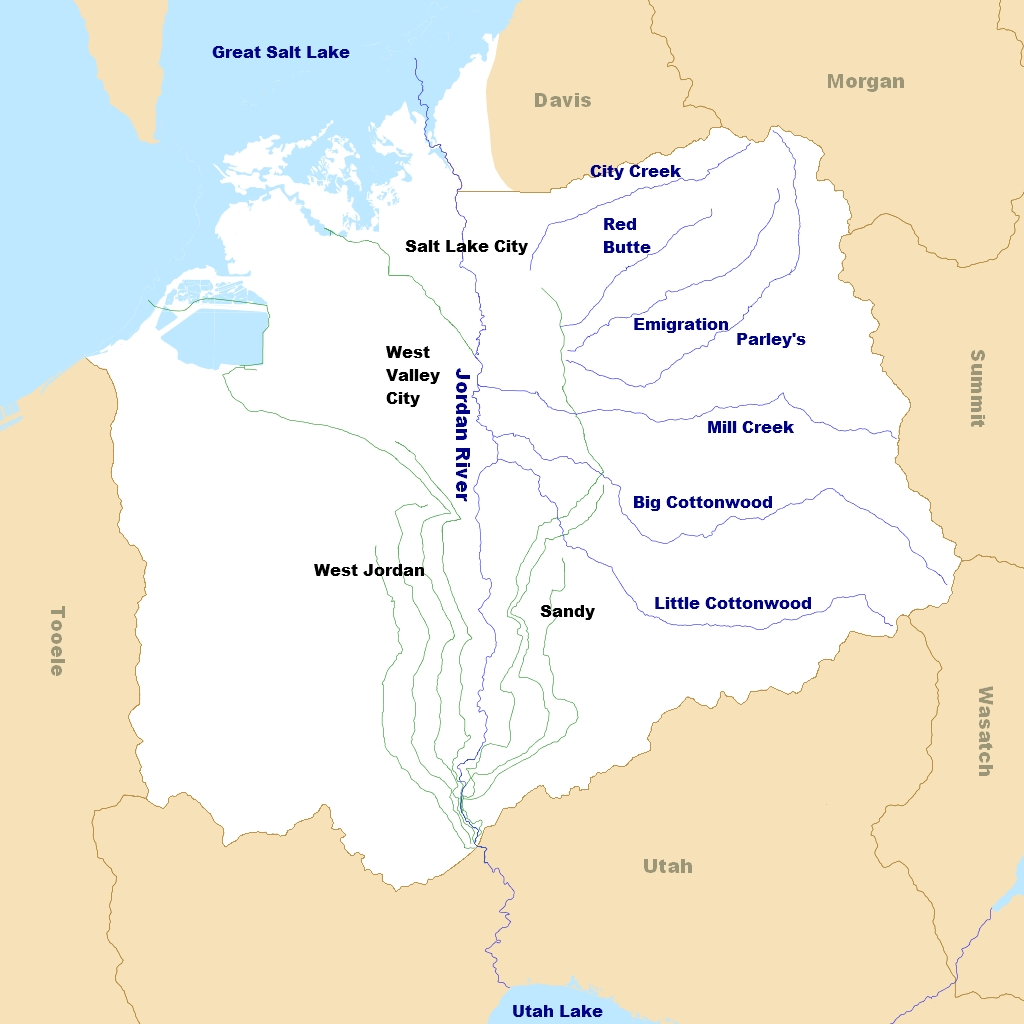
- Little Cottonwood Creek and other Salt Lake County streams

Location
- Country: United States
- State: Utah

Physical characteristics
- Source
  - location: Brighton, Utah, Salt Lake County, Utah
  - coordinates: 40°36′0″N 111°35′0″W
  - elevation: 9,600 ft (2,900 m)
- Mouth: Jordan River
  - location: Murray, Utah, Salt Lake County, Utah
  - coordinates: 40°40′47″N 111°54′42″W
  - elevation: 4,250 ft (1,300 m)
- Length: 26 mi (42 km)
- Basin size: 43 sq mi (110 km^{2})
- Discharge
  - location: Murray, Utah
  - average: 31.3 cu ft/s (0.89 m^{3}/s)
  - minimum: 5.0 cu ft/s (0.14 m^{3}/s)
  - maximum: 380 cu ft/s (11 m^{3}/s)

Big Cottonwood Creek is located in the Wasatch Mountains just east of Salt Lake City. It is part of the Big Cottonwood Creek Watershed, which ranges in elevation from 5,000 to 10,500 feet (1,500 to 3,200 m) with the headwaters around 9,600 feet (2,900 m). The creek flows through the Big Cottonwood Canyon in a westerly direction until it emerges into Salt Lake Valley about eighteen miles (29 km) from its highest source. Thence its course is northwesterly through Cottonwood Heights, Holladay, and Murray, Utah for a little over twenty-four miles (39 km) from the headwaters until it empties into the Jordan River about five miles (8.0 km) south of Salt Lake City. The water eventually flows into the Great Salt Lake. In the summer, its waters are all used for irrigation purposes. From its source to its original outlet in the Jordan River is about twenty-six miles (42 km).

== Hydrology ==
The creek flows from around 9,600 feet (2,900 m) at the headwaters to around 4,250 feet (1,300 m) when it reaches the confluence with the Jordan River. The stream flows northwest as it leaves the headwaters near the Brighton Ski Resort and then travels southwest about halfway down the canyon near Reynolds Gulch. At the base of the canyon, the stream leaves the Uinta-Wasatch-Cache National Forest, and a portion of the flow enters the Big Cottonwood Treatment Plant to provide municipal drinking water. At this point, the stream again flows northwest until the confluence with the Jordan River around the Murray area.

Rock glaciers, which are high elevation rock landforms, exist throughout the upper reaches of the canyon. Their bedrock commonly consists of Paleozoic quartzites and carbonates, Mesozoic mets-sedimentary and meta-volcanic rocks, and Cenozoic granitic and gneissic intrusions. These rock glaciers create mountain reservoirs, which are very significant as Utah is prone to severe and extreme droughts. These reservoirs allow the formation and accumulation of ice that is better insulated against rapid changes in air temperature and weather. They are able to sustain very stable conditions. They hold a large amount of water in the Big Cottonwood Watershed.

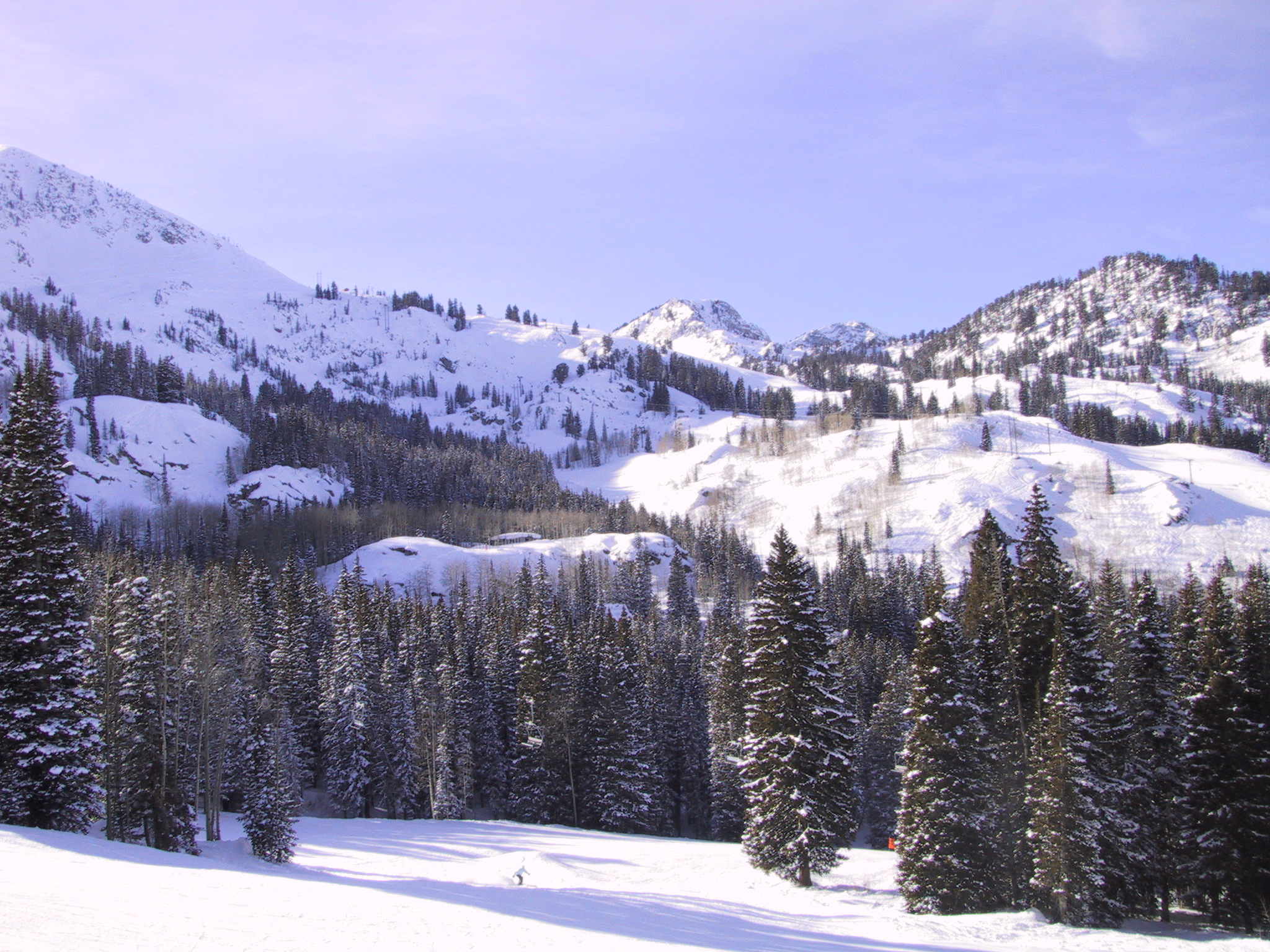
Brighton, Utah headwaters of Big Cottonwood Creek

The source waters at the top of the canyon begin near the Brighton Ski Resort and flow from Silver Lake, Twin Lakes Reservoir, Lake Mary, Lake Martha, Lake Catherine, and Dog Lake. Additionally, precipitation and many tributaries along the canyon contribute to Big Cottonwood Creek's water volume. Brighton receives over 50 inches (1,300 mm) of precipitation annually, most in the form of snow. 400 inches (10 m) of total annual snowfall is measured. The average water yield of Big Cottonwood Creek is 52,864 acre-feet (65,207,000 m^{3}), which is the highest water yield of any Wasatch Front canyon stream in Salt Lake County. This canyon is a protected watershed area under strict management controls since it is a major source of drinking water for Salt Lake City. No dogs or horses are allowed. The water quality provides an excellent source of drinking water.

Flooding is relatively rare for this creek. In the summer of 2010, Big Cottonwood Creek hit 4.1 feet (1.2 m) above the waterline. The flood stage for the urban waterways is 4.2 feet (1.3 m).

Big Cottonwood Canyon and the surrounding Uinta-Wasatch-Cache National Forest have a long history of resource use and development. As Salt Lake City grew through the mid-19th century to the early 20th century, tremendous demands were placed on natural resources through population growth, mining, railroading, and manufacturing. The canyons were stripped of timber, forage, and minerals by 1900. A serious impact was the timber industry's sawmills. The first mills were two mills built in the lower portion of Big Cottonwood Canyon by 1850, and in the next decade, the mills moved up the canyon. Today the canyon continues to be impacted by recreational demands and urban pressure.

== Recreation ==
Outdoor activities in the canyon include fishing, seasonal hunting, camping, hiking, picnicking, sightseeing, biking, rock climbing, skiing, and snowboarding. There are hundreds of places to stop and walk or hike to see Big Cottonwood Creek and its natural water features. The National Forest land in the canyon is intermixed with private land. The private land contains many homes, some right alongside Big Cottonwood Creek. Two large ski resorts are also located in the canyon: Brighton and Solitude. These resorts experience traffic all year. All of these activities further influence this ecosystem.

== Flora and Fauna ==
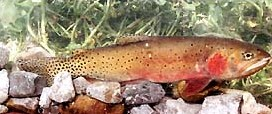
Bonneville cutthroat trout is a native of Big Cottonwood Creek

Big Cottonwood creek is surrounded by a wide variety of native trees including the quaking aspen, gamble oak, douglas-fir, blue spruce, engelmann spruce, mountain mahogany, lodgepole pine, white fir, bigtooth maple, rocky mountain maple, rocky mountain juniper and boxelder maple. Invasive trees and plants have become a problem because they can throw off the balance of an ecosystem. They can affect water quality, which leads to issues for biodiversity, habitats, erosion, soil erosion, and affects the way that native species can survive and reproduce.

Big Cottonwood Creek is home to rainbow trout (Oncorhynchus mykiss), brook trout (Salvelinus fontinalis), and brown trout (Salmo trutta) and the native Bonneville cutthroat trout (Oncorhynchus clarki utah). The Utah Division of Wildlife Resources stocks the creek with rainbow trout annually near Silver Lake. The Utah Division of Wildlife Resources has identified Big Cottonwood Creek as a Class II Fishery. This classifies the area as "a moderate to large productive stream with high aesthetic value where fishing and other recreational uses should be the primary consideration". It was determined to be an especially important water body due to its capacity to provide a strong resident trout fishery close to a metropolitan area.

== See also ==
- List of rivers of Utah
- Great Salt Lake
- Little Cottonwood Creek
