= Lou Andrus =

American football player (born 1943)

No. 84, 70
- Position: Linebacker

Personal information
- Born: July 10, 1943 (age 83); Murray, Utah, U.S.
- Listed height: 6 ft 6 in (1.98 m)
- Listed weight: 265 lb (120 kg)

Career information
- High school: Granite (South Salt Lake, Utah)
- College: BYU (1963-1966)
- NFL draft: 1967: 11th round, 269th overall pick

Career history
- Denver Broncos (1967); Winnipeg Blue Bombers (1970–1971)

Career AFL statistics
- Games played: 8
- Stats at Pro Football Reference

Louis John Andrus (born July 10, 1943) is an American former professional football player who was a linebacker in the American Football League (AFL). He played one season for the Denver Broncos (1967). He played college football at Brigham Young University.

== See also ==
- List of American Football League players
