= Desert Star Theater =

- Iris Theater, Apartments and Commercial Building
- U.S. National Register of Historic Places
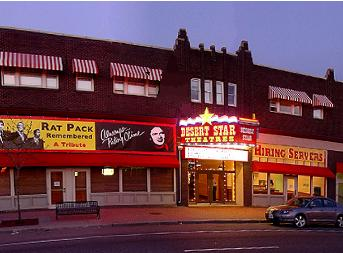
- Desert Star Playhouse resides in the historic Iris Theatre

- Location within Utah Location within the United States
- Location: 4861 South State Street. Murray, Utah
- Coordinates: 40°39′56″N 111°53′17″W
- Area: 1.31 acres (0.53 ha)
- Built: 1930
- Architectural style: Art Deco
- NRHP reference No.: 01000959
- Added to NRHP: September 7, 2001

Desert Star Theater is a dinner theater establishment in Murray, Utah. It started out as a small theater called the Gem, which showed silent movies with a piano for music. It was later closed down and demolished, but rebuilt and expanded into the Iris Theater by owner Tony Duvall. After his retirement, the Iris changed hands several times before being renamed the Vista.

The National Register of Historic Places, notes Iris Theater, Apartments and Commercial Building, built in 1930, is significant for its role in the urbanization of Murray City. With its combination of entertainment, retail, and residential space, the building represents an elaborate example of the multi-use commercial block common during the early twentieth-century development of the city's commercial business district. The building was owned by the Duvall family who managed the theater while living in the apartments above the storefronts. The Iris building is also significant as the only commercial building in Murray built in the Art Deco style. Though not a particularly ornate example of the style, the building makes a distinctive contribution to the State Street frontage of the Murray Downtown Historic District. The building is in good condition and is a contributing historic resource of the city.

The Iris was considered state-of-the-art at the time. The theater showed both blockbusters (e.g. "Gone with the Wind"), and more obscure fare (e.g. some Thursday nights were reserved for Swedish films shown especially for Swedish immigrants brought to Murray by the smelters). The theater had a stage where local groups could mount theatrical productions. The Iris Theater was a community place. Murray firemen sometimes held conventions there. Many of Murray's youths, including the Duvall children, worked in the theater. During the Great Depression, Tony Duvall would sometimes let children see a movie in exchange for scrap metal, or sometimes simply for free. Tony Duvall, with partner Joe Lawrence, later built the Murray Theater at 4961 South State. In the 1940s, the Iris would close during the summer while movies were shown in the larger (and cooler) Murray Theater.

The theater first became Desert Star when Mike and Alyce Todd attempted to produce a play near This Is The Place Heritage Park. This play was the first to exhibit the common traits found today in Desert Star plays. After the summer ended, they attempted to find an indoor location for their plays. They considered the closed down Vista, and eventually took it and renamed it the Desert Star Playhouse.

In 2000, after several successful plays, the city of Murray said that the building had to be brought up to code or torn down. The owner wanted to go with the latter, but the Todds decided to buy the theater and renovate. Today, the playhouse features Dinner and Cabaret theaters, as well as performing two shows in different theaters.

Desert Star is known for parody plays, doing comedic spoofs of classic movies and stories. They are also known for political jokes, and their themes tend to revolve around Utah. Each show also ends with a musical olio, in which the performers dress up in various costumes and do musical numbers.

== See also ==
- List of dinner theaters
