= Murray, Utah =

City in Utah, United States

- City
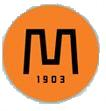
- Seal

- Location in Salt Lake County and the state of Utah.
- Coordinates: 40°39′9″N 111°53′36″W
- Country: United States
- State: Utah
- County: Salt Lake
- Settled: 1848
- Incorporated: January 3, 1903
- Named for: Eli Houston Murray

Government
  - Type: Mayor-Council
  - Mayor: Brett Hales

Area
  - Total: 12.32 sq mi (31.92 km^{2})
  - Land: 12.32 sq mi (31.91 km^{2})
  - Water: 0.0039 sq mi (0.01 km^{2})
- Elevation: 4,301 ft (1,311 m)

Population (2020)
  - Total: 50,637
  - Density: 3,969.8/sq mi (1,532.75/km^{2})
- Time zone: UTC−7 (MST)
  - Summer (DST): UTC−6 (MDT)
- ZIP codes: 84107, 84117, 84121, 84123
- Area codes: 385, 801
- FIPS code: 49-53230
- GNIS feature ID: 1443742
- Demonym: Murrayite
- Website: www.murray.utah.gov

Murray (/ˈmʌri/) is a city situated on the Wasatch Front in the core of Salt Lake Valley in the U.S. state of Utah. Named for territorial governor Eli Murray, the city had a population of 50,637 as of the 2020 United States Census. Murray shares borders with Taylorsville, Holladay, South Salt Lake, Millcreek and West Jordan, Utah. Once teeming with heavy industry, Murray's industry mix has now shifted significantly toward healthcare, retail, and professional, scientific, and technical services. Known for its central location in Salt Lake County, Murray has been called the Hub of Salt Lake County.

Unlike most of its neighboring communities which use unified civic services, Murray operates its own police, fire, power, water, library, and parks and recreation departments and also has its own school district. While maintaining many of its own services, Murray has one of the lowest city tax rates in the state.

Thousands of people each year visit Murray City Park for organized sports and its wooded areas. Murray is home to the Intermountain Medical Center, a medical campus that is also Murray's largest employer. Murray has been designated a Tree City USA since 1977.

== History ==
=== Pre-settlement ===
Before being permanently settled by Mormon pioneers in 1848, the area where Murray is located was a natural area that served as the seasonal home of Paiute, Shoshone, and Bannock Native American tribes. The tribes camped along local creek banks and stream beds during their migrations. Artifacts of Native American encampments have been located along the Jordan River, including camps near Willow Pond Park.

At what was known as the "big bend" of the Jordan River (near 4984 South 700 West Street), the Goshute Indians from Skull Valley made their camp. This was made every spring on the way to their hunting ground at the headwaters of the Bear River. On their return in the fall, they also stayed for a week and traded with white settlers. Early settlers recorded that they generally traded buffalo robes, deer skins, dried meat and tallow.

=== A new settlement ===
Mormon pioneers came into the Salt Lake Valley in 1847. A pioneer group that was called the Mississippi Saints arrived one year later and began to develop a scattered settlement in the south end of the valley that fall. The area was distinguished by various names, such as the Mississippi Ward, Cottonwood, Big Cottonwood and South Cottonwood. Written history states that at least 20 families were living in the South Cottonwood area in the 1860s.

When the first pioneer families settled in the South Cottonwood area in the fall of 1848, they selected the low or bottom lands along the streams of Little Cottonwood Creek and Big Cottonwood Creek. They found an abundance of grass for their cattle and horses there. It was easy to take the water from the streams for irrigation of farm crops. The higher bench lands were covered with sagebrush and produced very little grass. Because of the labor and difficulty in getting water to them, they were left, for later settlement.

There was a strip of high bench land, completely surrounded by low land north of what is now Vine Street and 5600 South Street. Before and after the advent of the pioneers, this land was used by the Ute Indians as a camping ground. This is because water and grass could be obtained on either side of it and enemies could not approach without being seen long before coming to the high ground. This area would become the present-day Murray City Cemetery. The early settlers mutually agreed that no individual should fence or take title to it, but that it should be set aside and considered as belonging to South Cottonwood Ward.

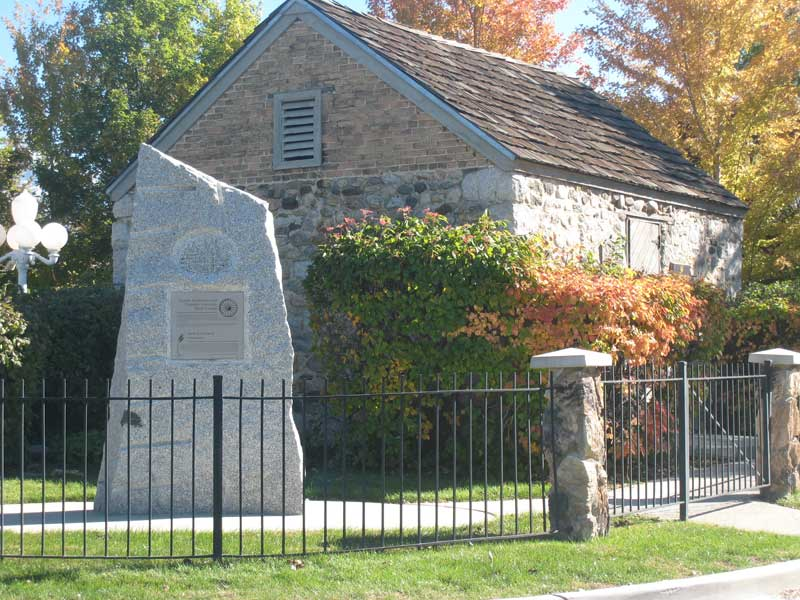
The Sons of Utah Pioneer's South Cottonwood Monument

In 1853, when teamsters commenced to haul granite rock from Little Cottonwood Canyon to the Salt Lake Temple construction site, a dirt path was made along what is now Vine Street. The east side of the road (at the northeast corner, where the Stillwater Apartments now stand) became a halfway camping ground for the teamsters. The first building in the Salt Lake Valley outside of Salt Lake City erected for the purpose of religious and educational instruction was built on present-day Gordon Lane, and is commemorated with a monument from the Sons of the Utah Pioneers.

In 1858, during the so-called Utah War, Albert Sidney Johnston's army of the Utah Expedition passed through western Murray after camping on the "flats" above the North Jordan farms. Its large livestock herd reportedly ate everything to within an inch of the ground. General Johnston, who was crossing James Winchester's property (now Murray Parkway Golf Course), advised Winchester to pursue a homestead patent. In 1870 James Winchester entered the first homestead of the entire Intermountain West.

The Pony Express traveled through central Murray, along what is now State Street. The Utah Pony Express Station Number 9 was located near present-day 6200 State Street and was called "Travelers' Rest", but the accommodations were meager, consisting of a stable and one-room bunk house. The Overland Stagecoach later made use of Travelers' Rest during its period of operation. The Sons of Utah Pioneers erected a monument at 7200 State Street in Midvale commemorating the station.

The area remained agricultural until 1869 when a body of ore was found in Park City, Utah, and additional ore deposits were found in Little Cottonwood Canyon. Because of Murray's central location and access to the railroad, the first smelter was built there in 1870 and over the next 30 years Murray became home to some of the largest smelters of gold, silver, copper, lead and zinc in the region.

The first official post office was established in 1870 as the South Cottonwood Post Office. The area changed over time as the railroad came in, smelting expanded, the territorial road (later known as State Street) was established, and trolley transportation was developed. A business district also began to develop along the transportation corridor. (See also Murray Downtown Historic District and Murray Downtown Residential Historic District.)

The army established Camp Murray in 1885 to house several companies of the Ninth Infantry Regiment. The army camp was meant to help protect the railroad and provide training. The short-lived camp's most notable action was when General Alexander McDowell McCook and six divisions of the camp were ordered to escort Chinese nationals out of Evanston, Wyoming, due to the race riots that were happening among miners in Rock Springs, Wyoming. The camp was disbanded in the early 20th century.

The city received its present name from the post office, which had officially changed its name from South Cottonwood Post Office to Murray Post Office in 1883, after the Civil War general, Eli Murray, territorial governor of Utah from 1880 to 1886.

After a riot and fire were started by a rowdy group of smelter workers in a local saloon, a local newspaper editor began agitating for the settlement to be incorporated. The final incorporation committee drafted a petition in 1901 and created an intense campaign on both sides of the incorporation battle. An incorporation election was held on November 18, 1902. Those in favor won, and C.L. Miller was elected Mayor by a margin of three votes. Salt Lake County recognized the election results as official on November 25, 1902, and the city was officially recognized as a Third Class City by the State of Utah on January 3, 1903.

=== Center of industry ===
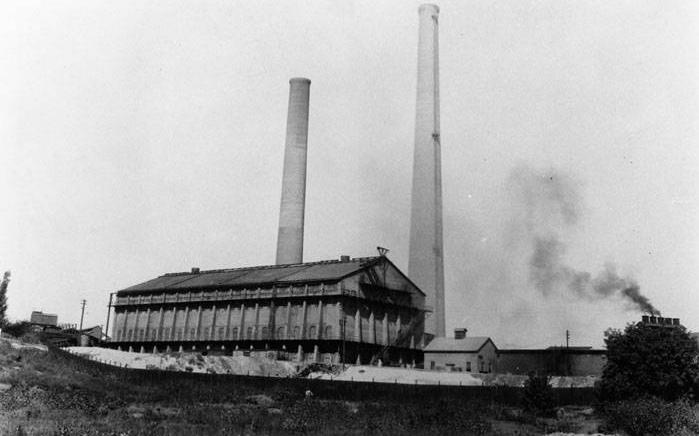
Murray's landmark smoke stacks, circa 1920s

Murray's central location in Salt Lake Valley made it a convenient location for industry. Construction of the Woodhill Brothers' smelter in 1869 initiated Murray's industrial history. In 1870, Murray produced the first silver bars smelted in Utah. In 1899, American Smelting & Refining Company (ASARCO) was organized by combining the Germania and Hanauer smelters. The smelters continued to dominate the local economy until the close of the ASARCO lead smelter in 1949. Business and commercial enterprise prospered along with the smelter industry. Murray's industry would later include a water plant, lighting system, canning factory, flour mills, and brickyards. Many of those employed at the Franklyn and Germania smelters were immigrants from Scandinavian countries who had joined the LDS church in their homeland and moved to Utah; most spoke little English. The Scandinavian population settled in the area west of State Street and was large enough to hold separate LDS services in the Swedish language. (See Murray LDS Second Ward Meetinghouse). The Scandinavians eventually dispersed, and with the exception of their meetinghouse, few ethnic reminders remain in this section of Murray. Joe Hill, the Industrial Workers of the World labor activist came to Murray in 1914 to rally laborers working at the smelters and nearby mines. He was arrested for a double homicide in Salt Lake City while recovering from a gunshot wound at the Murray home of Edward and John Eselius, that was located on 4800 South (then known as 17th South St.) and Plum Street.

"Bergertown", a cluster of homes south of 4800 South Street on Little Cottonwood Creek, was settled by Swiss immigrant Christian Berger prior to the town's industrialization. Simple small two-room frame houses without paint and running water characterized this side of town. Bergertown quickly became an immigrant enclave, as the population were mainly employees of the smelters. A few original homes remain among modern retail establishments.

In addition to the impact of lawsuits due to the spread of lead dust, Murray's industry suffered greatly in the 1930s depression. The smelters began to close in 1931, and major industry had nearly vanished by 1940. By the 1950s the industry was completely gone. Murray was quick to take advantage of various federal projects to compensate for this economic loss. In 2000, to avoid designation as a Superfund site, the landmark ASARCO Smelters were imploded, and Intermountain Healthcare purchased the site for its Intermountain Medical Center. As landmarks, the smelters are remembered in Murray's logos and trademarks.

=== Post–World War II to present ===
With the demise of heavy industry prior to World War II, and the advent of the Interstate Freeway System in the 1950s, Murray became a major retail hub due to its central location. State Street is dominated by automobile dealerships, where auto magnate, Larry H. Miller, purchased his first dealership May 1, 1979, as Larry H. Miller Toyota.

Fashion Place Mall was constructed in the 1970s. It is now a major mercantile center which saw major renovation and expansion in the first decade of the 21st century. The mall achieved some fame after serial killer Ted Bundy's murder spree temporarily came to an end when he tried to lure Carol DaRonch into his car at the mall on November 8, 1974. DaRonch fought Bundy, escaped from his car, and survived to testify against him in court.

Cottonwood Hospital opened in the 1960s, receiving numerous recognitions. Replaced by Intermountain Medical Center (IMC) in 2007, it spawned The Orthopedic Specialty Hospital (TOSH) in the 1990s.

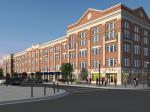
Murray's Fireclay Neighborhood

As part of the construction of the Utah Transit Authority's (UTA) TRAX light-rail line in the 1990s, three stations were built in Murray along the primary route (for both the Blue Line and Red Line). The Fireclay Housing Project received national recognition for its use of creating development around the Murray North station as a Transit-Oriented Development (TOD). Murray's Fashion Place West station is the junction for the Red Line (Mid-Jordan Line) light-rail spur. In 2012 FrontRunner commuter rail service was extended to Murray Central station.

In the mid-2000s, people of the census-designated place (CDP), Cottonwood West, petitioned for annexation into Murray, increasing the population by 17,000, nearly one-third more than in the 2000 census. Murray's eastern boundary, along 900 East, was extended as a result of the annexation to Van Winkle Expressway and Highland Drive, along the city borders of Holladay and Cottonwood Heights.

== Government ==
Murray City Hall, built in 2023

Incorporated on January 3, 1903, Murray initially created a Mayor-Council form of government. A 1911 State law changed the form of government for cities of the First and Second Class in Utah from the old Council form to the Commission form of government. This form of government was reversed in 1981. The City adopted the "Strong Mayor"-Council form of government, which included an elected Mayor and five City Council members. To ensure staggered terms of the council, an election is held every two years for half the Council members for four-year terms. The city provides for most of its own services, including Police, Fire, Power, Water, Sewer, Library, Senior Center, and Parks and Recreation. George Huscher was mayor of Murray during 1912–1915, and was the first (and to date only) Socialist elected to a major office in Utah. Murray's citywide elections are now non-partisan races.

Murray is located in Utah's 4th congressional district, which is represented by Burgess Owens.

== Crime ==
=== Property Crime ===
According to FBI‑based crime statistics, Murray has a significantly higher property crime rate than the national average. Multiple analyses of FBI Crime Data Explorer figures report that Murray’s property crime rate exceeds those of several major U.S. cities, including New York City, Los Angeles, Chicago, Houston, Phoenix, and Philadelphia.

== Geography ==
=== Topography ===
According to the United States Census Bureau, the city has a total area of 9.6 square miles (25 km^{2}), all land. Murray is located in the heart of the Salt Lake Valley. The city is nearly built out with a broad mix of commercial, residential and industrial uses. The topography is generally gentle, sloping westward from the nearby Wasatch Mountain Range toward the Jordan River, which is the terminal river feature in the Salt Lake Valley. Murray's average altitude is approximately 1300 meters above sea level, with the highest variation located near the border of Cottonwood Heights and lowest variation along the Jordan River near 4500 South.

Lying at the base of the Wasatch Mountains, and located approximately three miles to the east of Murray, in neighboring Holladay, is the Wasatch Fault. Liquefaction is a particular danger to Murray because of the close proximity of the Wasatch fault. Soil liquefaction potential, according to the Utah Geological Survey, estimates that the majority of Murray is in either High or Moderate Liquefaction zones. City policies are in place to minimize the potential impacts on structures.

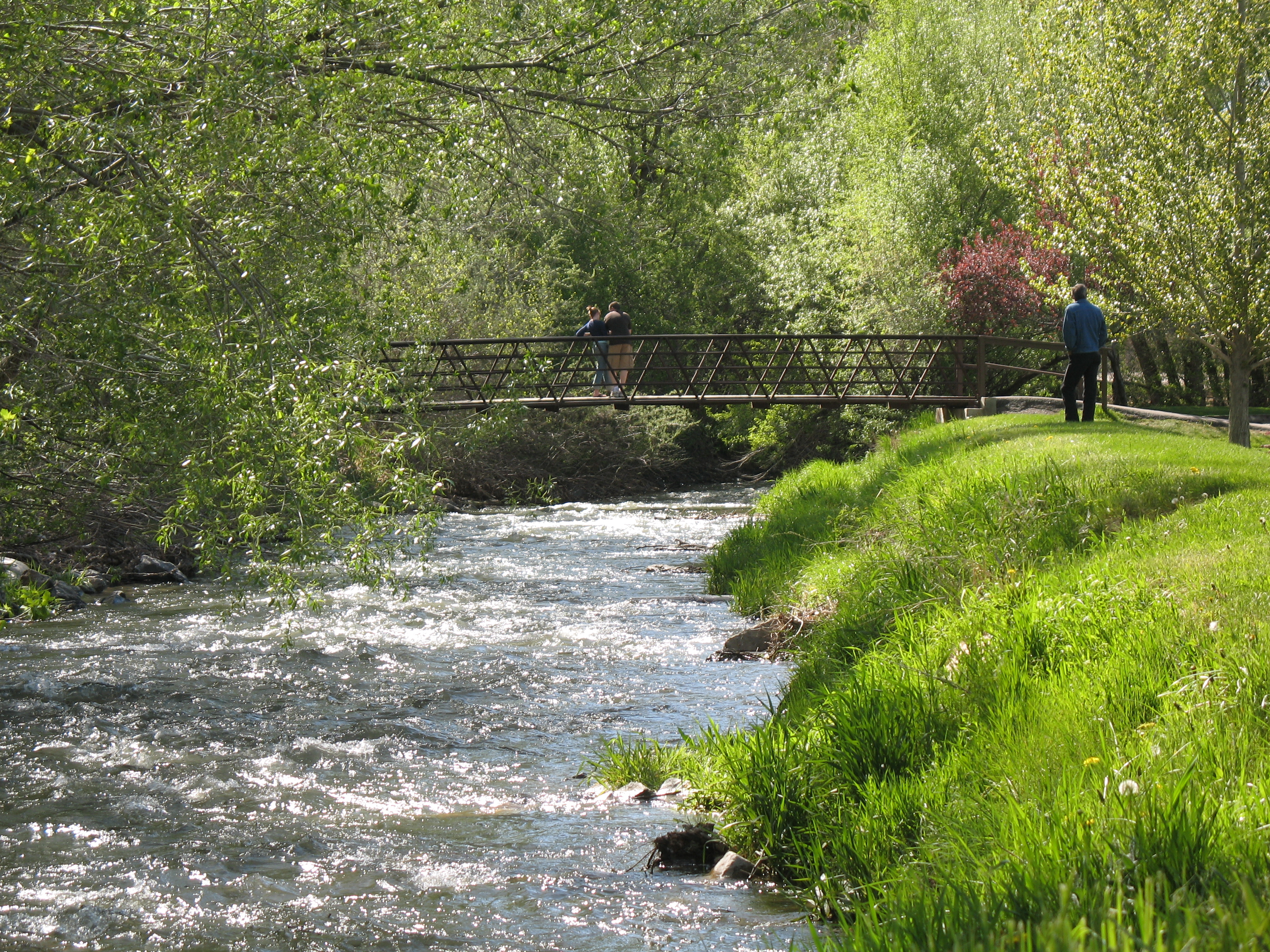
Little Cottonwood Creek in Murray City Park

=== Hydrology ===
The Jordan River is the largest water feature within Murray. It traverses the western edge of Murray, where it eventually reaches the Great Salt Lake. Murray administers a trail and green area that borders the river through the whole city. Big Cottonwood and Little Cottonwood Creeks join the Jordan River within Murray boundaries, following routes between properties, along streets, and through parks and open spaces. Significant wetlands adjoin the river and these two creeks.

Murray contains only small lakes. Willow Pond and Turner Pond are the largest natural lakes within the city limits. Willow Pond is the only lake that permits public access, and is stocked with fish. Several man-made lakes have been created in the Lynn Pett Murray Parkway and Mick Riley Golf Courses. Other lakes are small and are contained within Murray's wetland areas.

=== Climate ===
Murray has a Mediterranean climate (Köppen Csa).

Climate data for Murray, Utah
Month	Jan	Feb	Mar	Apr	May	Jun	Jul	Aug	Sep	Oct	Nov	Dec	Year
Record high °F (°C)	61 (16)	67 (19)	76 (24)	86 (30)	93 (34)	100 (38)	101 (38)	102 (39)	96 (36)	86 (30)	75 (24)	68 (20)	102 (39)
Mean daily maximum °F (°C)	39 (4)	44 (7)	53 (12)	61 (16)	70 (21)	82 (28)	89 (32)	88 (31)	78 (26)	65 (18)	50 (10)	40 (4)	63 (17)
Mean daily minimum °F (°C)	25 (−4)	30 (−1)	37 (3)	43 (6)	51 (11)	60 (16)	67 (19)	66 (19)	57 (14)	46 (8)	35 (2)	27 (−3)	45 (8)
Record low °F (°C)	8 (−13)	−3 (−19)	16 (−9)	26 (−3)	30 (−1)	39 (4)	50 (10)	45 (7)	37 (3)	23 (−5)	12 (−11)	−6 (−21)	−6 (−21)
Average precipitation inches (mm)	1.58 (40)	1.63 (41)	2.02 (51)	2.18 (55)	2.31 (59)	0.84 (21)	0.71 (18)	0.64 (16)	1.24 (31)	1.69 (43)	1.65 (42)	1.26 (32)	15.74 (400)

== Education ==
=== Primary and secondary schools ===
The Murray City School District was created on January 1, 1906. It has ten schools: seven elementary, two middle schools, (Riverview and Hillcrest), and one senior high school (Murray). An alternative high school, (Creekside) was closed in 2006. Murray High School is a 4-A school in Utah's 5 Division high school sports leagues (1A being the smallest; 5A the largest). It was used in the High School Musical movie series for the Walt Disney Company.

The Granite School District operates Cottonwood High School and Woodstock Elementary School within the Murray boundaries.

=== Higher education ===
Several private colleges have campuses in Murray: University of Phoenix, Stevens-Henager College, and Eagle Gate College.

== Parks and recreation ==
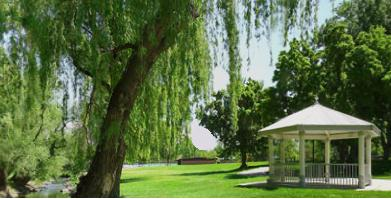
Murray City Park Gazebo and Little Cottonwood Creek

Murray took advantage of various federal projects during the Great Depression to develop its Park System. The city actively sought federal money to refurbish its 22-acre Murray City Park and buildings and to purchase an additional twelve acres of fairgrounds. By 1939, Murray was the site of the annual Salt Lake County Fair. The county fair relocated from Murray Park, and the Fair buildings were replaced by a community recreation facility called the Park Center, with indoor swimming pools, indoor track, exercise facilities and gymnasium. Murray Park's Ken Price Ball Park hosted the 2009 Babe Ruth League World Series and the 2012 Babe Ruth League World Series. Murray Park is adjacent to the Salt Lake County Ice Center that was utilized as a practice venue during the 2002 Olympic Winter Games.

There are several neighborhood parks, as well as the substantial Jordan River Parkway; a park system of natural trails along the Jordan River that includes pedestrian and equestrian trails, picnic areas, and canoe launches. The trails connect several significant city parks of Winchester, Walden Park, Germania Park, and Arrowhead. The parkway also has The Kennecott Nature Center, an environmental education center that is utilized by school districts.

Wheeler Historic Farm is located in Murray. Operated by Salt Lake County, the farm is a restoration of Henry J. Wheeler's turn-of-the-20th-century dairy farm. The farm presents to the public the history of Utah family agriculture and rural lifestyle from 1890 to 1920, and gives historic demonstrations and exhibits.

=== Parks and recreation facilities in Murray ===
==== Salt Lake County managed facilities ====
- Mick Riley Golf Course- Two courses include an Executive and Par 3 course
- Salt Lake County Ice Center- Ice Skating and Hockey
- Wheeler Historic Farm- Historical park and natural area

==== City of Murray managed facilities ====
- Park Center- indoor pool, basketball courts, weight room, spin room, track
- Murray Aquatics Center- outdoor pool
- L. Clark Cushing Senior Recreation Center- recreation center for senior citizens
- Lynn Pett Murray Parkway Golf Course- 18 Hole executive course
- Jordan River Parkway- Natural trail and equestrian paths
- Murray City Park- baseball stadium, softball stadium, soccer, rugby, arboretum, amphitheatre, playgrounds
- Arrowhead Park- picnic area and trailhead
- Germania Park- outdoor basketball, soccer, playground
- Grant Park- baseball complex, playgrounds
- Hidden Village Park- tennis, soccer, and playground
- Southwood Park- tennis, playground
- Walden Park- canoe launch, playground
- Willow Pond Park- fishing, baseball, soccer, playgrounds
- Winchester Park- canoe launch, natural area, playground
- Woodstock Meadows Park- Natural area, pavilion, and playground
- Riverview Park- Tennis, shuffleboard, horseshoe pits, baseball complex

== Sports ==
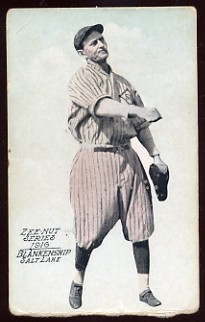
Cliff Blankenship, coach/player of Murray Infants and later Salt Lake Bees

=== Ice skating and hockey ===
For the 2002 XIX Winter Olympiad in Salt Lake City, the Salt Lake County Ice Center was a practice venue, primarily for women's hockey, and hosted a preliminary game between Germany and Kazakhstan. The U.S. Figure Skating sanctions the facility and its figure skating lessons. USA Hockey hosts an adult league that utilizes the facility. Youth and beginner hockey lessons are offered.

=== Rugby ===
The Murray Park Rugby Stadium has hosted USA Rugby's national high school championships. The Highland Rugby club, one of the most nationally successful high school rugby programs, is based there. Utah Rugby Football Union, an affiliate of the Pacific Coast Rugby Football Union, sanctions most semi-professional, adult, collegiate, and high school clubs that use the field.

In June 2012 this stadium hosted the 2012 IRB Junior World Rugby Trophy.

=== Baseball ===
In 1914, Murray had its own professional baseball team called the Murray Infants which was part of the Union Association league. The team was managed by Cliff Blankenship, a former Cincinnati Reds and Washington Senators player. Notable players include Ike Caveney who was called up to play in the Cincinnati Reds and Mickey Shader that later managed a team in the Reds baseball farm system. The team folded in 1914 with the collapse of the league.

In August 2009, Murray hosted its first 13-Year-Old Babe Ruth League World Series. All World Series games were played at the 3000-seat Ken Price Ball Park, home field to Murray High School baseball team and next to Murray City Park. Adult, high school and youth leagues use the facility that is sanctioned by the Murray City Parks and Recreation department. Murray hosted the 14-Year-Old Babe Ruth League World Series in 2012.

=== Basketball ===
When the Utah Jazz first located to Utah in 1979, the Sports Mall fitness center was reserved as a practice facility for visiting teams including notable players Larry Bird and Magic Johnson. The Jazz later constructed its own practice center.

Utah Jazz players hold basketball clinics and camps for youth at the Murray Park Center. Murray's adult and youth basketball leagues are sanctioned by the Murray City Parks and Recreation department.

=== Soccer ===
Murray was one of three final candidates to be the home of the Real Salt Lake soccer team. The stadium was awarded to Sandy, Utah. Sanctioned by the Murray Parks and Recreation department, adult and youth leagues play on the numerous soccer fields. The department also has a small soccer stadium located in Willow Pond Park. The US Youth Soccer Association sanctions games that are played there.

=== Golf ===
The Murray Parkway Golf Course has been rated among the top 25 golf courses in Utah. It has hosted events for the Utah State Amateur Championship of the Utah Golf Association. Mick Riley Golf Course also has hosted Utah State Amateur events.

=== Boxing ===
While Murray no longer has a boxing venue, it did host a number of championship fights in the early part of the 20th century. Most notable was boxing legend Jack Dempsey's only defeat, due to a knockout, at the Murray Fire Hall (4735 South State Street). Dempsey was knocked out by Fireman Jim Flynn on February 13, 1917, and many speculated that Dempsey may have thrown the fight as he was knocked out in the first round, but witnesses stated he was on the mat for at least 20 seconds. One year earlier, Dempsey defeated the boxer, Young Hector who retired from the fight at the same location.

Murray hosted the 1913 welterweight tournament for the western United States. Ernest "Cyclone" Wright won the Welterweight championship of the western states. He was also a member of Murray's first volunteer fire department.

== Library ==
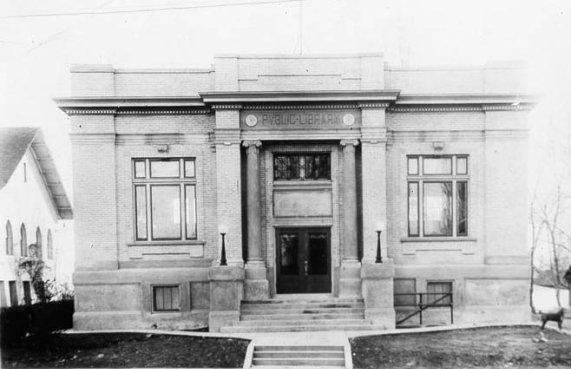
Murray City's Carnegie Library in 1912

Murray City Library was established on January 6, 1911, and started as one of the Carnegie libraries. Murray later created an additional small library in 1965 on Valley Drive. In 1992, Murray consolidated its two libraries into a new center on 5300 South that would permit it to have more books and include study space and conference rooms. The new library was further renovated in 2008, increasing public computers and Wi-Fi access throughout the building. The historic Carnegie library on Vine Street was demolished in 2020 to make way for new development. Murray's library is independent from the Salt Lake County and Salt Lake City library systems. However, there is a reciprocal borrowing agreement between all three entities.

Murray City Library offers activities for all ages, including book clubs, story times, chess clubs and afterschool activities for grade-school children and teenagers. The physical, in-building collection has grown to include books, DVDs, CDs, audiobooks, tablets, Wi-Fi hotspots, and a telescope. The online collection includes downloadable books, audiobooks, magazines, music, and movies. In 2023, Murray City Library partnered with Murray City Parks and Recreation to create the Tale Trail, an outdoor reading experience for children and their families.

== Arts and culture ==
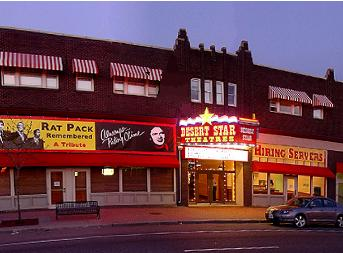
Desert Star Playhouse

Murray is home to several professional and amateur performing-arts groups, notably, the Desert Star Playhouse, located in the historic Iris Theatre which is noted for its community-based plays and melodramas. The historic Murray Theatre hosts a variety of performing acts, primarily musical, throughout the year, and has hosted screenings for the Slamdance Film Festival. The city-sponsored Murray Park Amphitheatre produces plays in the outdoor setting of Murray Park during the summer.

The Murray Symphony Orchestra (MSO) is a community-based orchestra of professional and amateur musicians. The MSO is volunteer-based and receives funding from Murray and Salt Lake County. MSO also features jazz and string combos.

The Ballet Centre in Murray features ballet performances, with training for children and adults. The Murray Arts Centre features ballroom dancing in addition to modern styles of dance on a daily basis, and has live big band and jazz combo accompaniment.

The Murray City Cultural Arts program was created in 1992 under the Parks and Recreation Department. Together, the Arts Advisory Board and the Cultural Programs Office have created year-round cultural activities including arts-in-education projects, workshops and camps, musicals, visual art exhibits and competitions involving over 5000 youth and adults annually. A summer and winter season, created together with local performing arts organizations, have been successfully operating since 1990. Murray Arts in the Park entertains over 13,000 patrons each summer.

=== Historic architecture ===
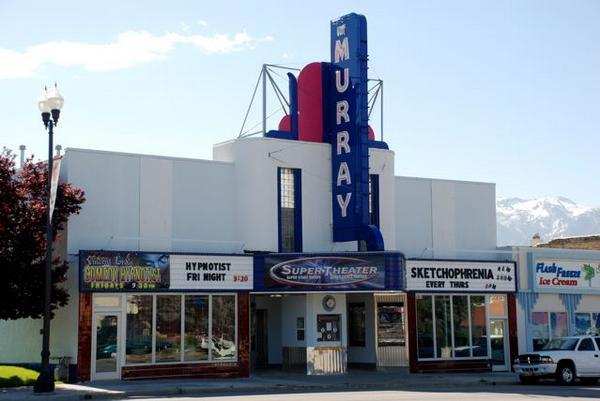
The Murray Theater

Murray has several buildings and districts listed on the National Park Service's National Historic Register:

- Murray Downtown Historic District
- Murray Downtown Residential Historic District
- Wheeler Farm
- Murray Theater
- Desert Star Theater
- John P. Cahoon House (Murray Mansion)
- Murray LDS Second Ward Meetinghouse
- Warenski-Duvall Commercial Building and Apartments

== Demographics ==
Historical population
Census	Pop.	Note	%±
1900	3,302		—
1910	4,057		22.9%
1920	4,584		13.0%
1930	5,172		12.8%
1940	5,740		11.0%
1950	9,006		56.9%
1960	16,806		86.6%
1970	21,206		26.2%
1980	25,750		21.4%
1990	31,282		21.5%
2000	34,024		8.8%
2010	46,746		37.4%
2020	50,637		8.3%
U.S. Decennial Census

=== 2020 census ===
As of the 2020 census, Murray had a population of 50,637. The median age was 36.4 years. 21.0% of residents were under the age of 18 and 16.5% of residents were 65 years of age or older. For every 100 females there were 94.7 males, and for every 100 females age 18 and over there were 92.2 males age 18 and over.

100.0% of residents lived in urban areas, while 0.0% lived in rural areas.

There were 20,421 households in Murray, of which 26.6% had children under the age of 18 living in them. Of all households, 44.5% were married-couple households, 19.4% were households with a male householder and no spouse or partner present, and 28.8% were households with a female householder and no spouse or partner present. About 28.9% of all households were made up of individuals and 11.1% had someone living alone who was 65 years of age or older.

There were 21,659 housing units, of which 5.7% were vacant. The homeowner vacancy rate was 0.9% and the rental vacancy rate was 9.1%.

Racial composition as of the 2020 census
Race	Number	Percent
White	39,834	78.7%
Black or African American	1,171	2.3%
American Indian and Alaska Native	496	1.0%
Asian	1,702	3.4%
Native Hawaiian and Other Pacific Islander	405	0.8%
Some other race	2,320	4.6%
Two or more races	4,709	9.3%
Hispanic or Latino (of any race)	6,652	13.1%

== Transportation ==
=== Roads ===
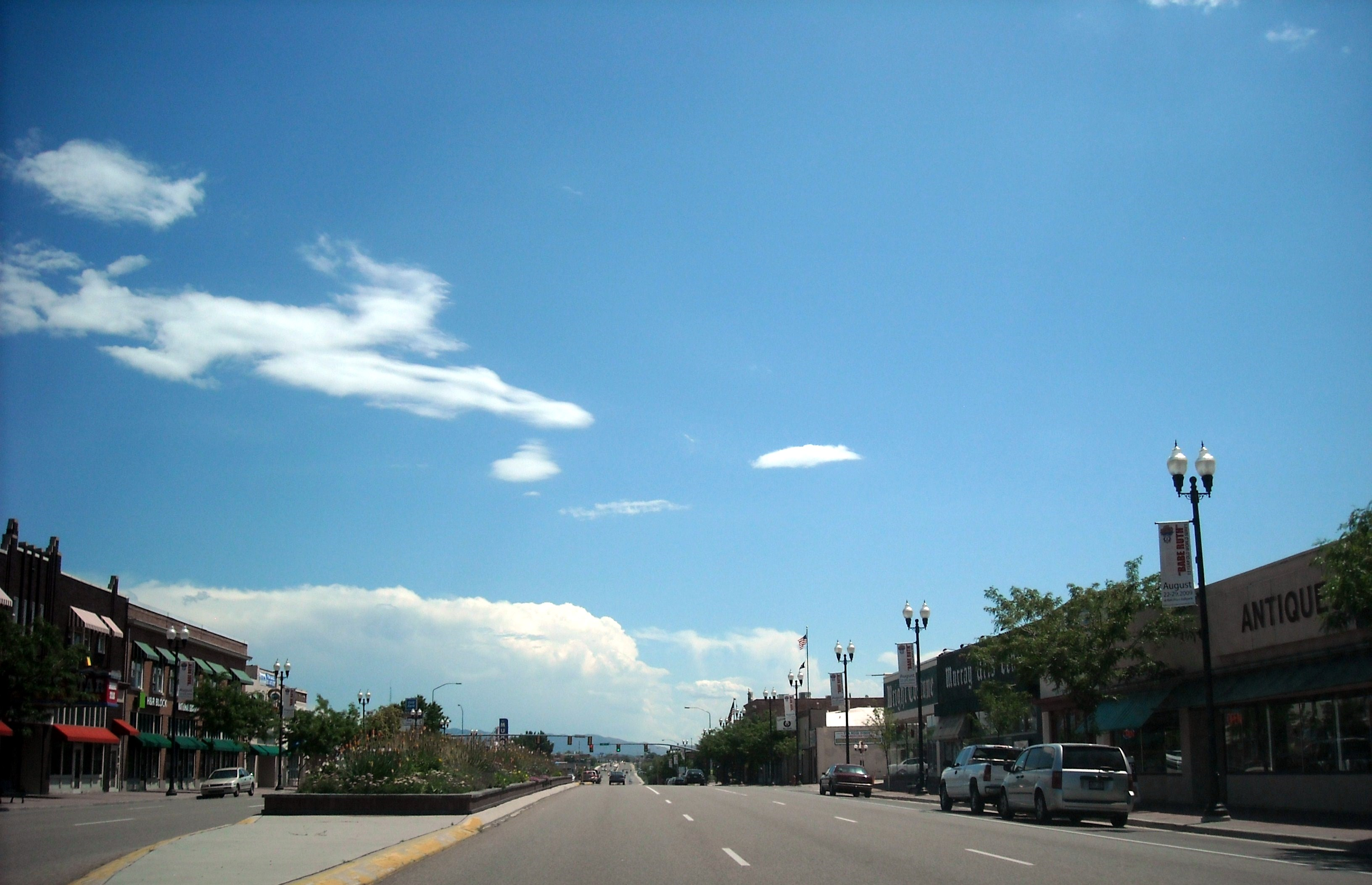
Downtown Murray on State Street

Southern Murray contains the major interchange between Interstate 15, a ten-lane north–south freeway that divides Murray centrally, and Interstate 215, an auxiliary eight-lane freeway that roughly follows the southern boundary of the city. Interstate 15 provides two interchanges inside city limits at 4500 South (SR-266) and 5300 South (SR-173). Interstate 215 provides two interchanges at State Street (US-89) and Union Park Boulevard. State Street runs through central Murray through the Murray Downtown Historic District and passes by the main retail centers at 5300 South and the Fashion Place Mall. Van Winkle Expressway (SR-152) is a four-lane road that forms the eastern boundary of Murray, while 4500 South traverses the northern part of Murray and extends the length of Salt Lake Valley. 5400 South enters western Murray and then shifts northward one block to become 5300 South, which bears the honorary designation of Spartan Boulevard from Woodrow Street to State Street.

=== Rail ===
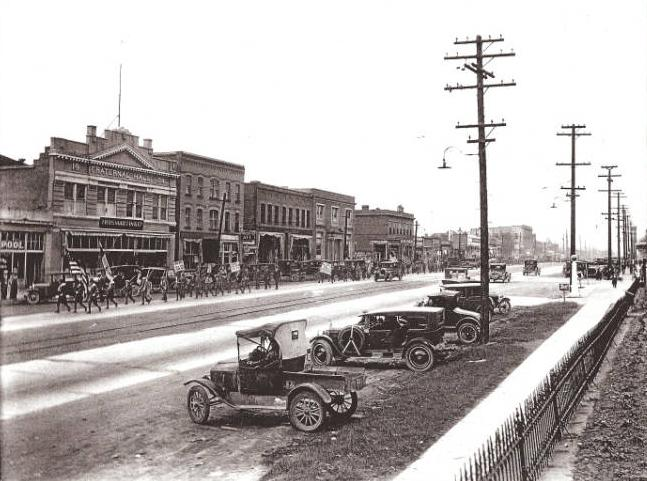
Murray's historic downtown with Trolley Tracks, circa 1920

Historically, the railroad was vital to the development of Murray. In 1870 the railroad line was extended southward through Murray and was called the Utah Southern. The Rio Grande Western (RGW) railway came in the fall of 1881 and purchased the Alta lines which had been built earlier. RGW merged to form the Denver and Rio Grande Western Railroad which later created a depot in Murray. The Utah Northern Railway developed a key terminus in the late 19th century that connected mining operations from Park City and Bingham, and Murray's industrial complex developed along that rail line. Utah Northern Railway and Oregon Short Line Railroad merged and were later acquired by Union Pacific Railroad.

Downtown Murray was accessible by trolley car, operated by the Utah Light and Railway, at the beginning of the 20th century. The trolley ran along State Street from downtown Salt Lake City to Murray. E.H. Harriman, president of Union Pacific and Southern Pacific Railroads, purchased Utah Light and Railway and continued its operation until the 1920s.

=== Public transit ===
Murray is served by the Utah Transit Authority (UTA) bus system. Two lines of UTA's TRAX light rail serve Murray. The Blue Line connects Murray with Downtown Salt Lake City and Draper, while the Red Line connects with the University of Utah and the Daybreak Community in South Jordan. Both the Blue and Red Lines connect further north with the Green Line which provides service to West Valley City and the Salt Lake City International Airport (via Downtown Salt Lake City). Murray's section of TRAX has three stations: Murray North station located on Fireclay Ave (4300 South), Murray Central station at 5200 South, and Fashion Place West station. UTA's FrontRunner commuter rail opened for service in December 2012, extending Frontrunner from Pleasant View (on the north) south to Provo. Murray station is the only station outside of Salt Lake City where both FrontRunner and TRAX connect.

== Infrastructure ==
Electric power came into Murray in 1905, with the Progress Electric Company; they strung enough wire to light over a hundred street lights in the city, and a few buildings. City residents and businesses soon clamored for more electricity, which Progress Electric didn't have the capacity to deliver. The City commissioners decided to acquire the system and improve upon delivering power to more people. On July 9, 1912, the city commission approved a resolution to create a municipally owned power company. That same resolution also created a municipally owned water and sewage system. Murray generates much of its electricity from natural gas, coal, and water turbines. Murray was one of the first communities in Utah to receive power from methane generated in its landfill. Methane electricity generation fulfills 3 percent of Murray's needs but it is estimated that it can cover up to 13 percent.

Murray Public Services operates its water, sewer, and garbage and recycling program. Some areas of the city are serviced by the Salt Lake Valley Water Conservancy District and Jordan Valley Water Conservancy District.

== Sister cities ==
Murray has one sister city, as designated by Sister Cities International:

Republic of China	Taiwan	Chiayi	Chiayi County

== Notable people ==
- Gary Andersen, head football coach, Utah State University
- Jack Anderson, Pulitzer Prize winner, started writing for the Murray Eagle
- Lou Andrus, former linebacker, 1967, for the Denver Broncos
- David Archuleta, American Idol season 7 runner-up
- Ben B. Banks, LDS Church General authority, Presidency of the Seventy
- Shawn Bradley, former Brigham Young University and NBA Basketball player.
- Deondra Brown, member of The 5 Browns classical piano ensemble.
- Lauren Cholewinski, 2010 Olympic speed skater, resides in Murray while training
- Parley Parker Christensen, Utah and California politician, Esperantist. Teacher in Murray.
- Nathaniel Coleman, 2020 Olympic silver-medalist in men's combined sport climbing.
- Kevin Curtis, National Football League player
- Carol DaRonch, human rights activist
- Bruce Hardy, former Miami Dolphins football player, Arena Football head coach
- Allan Howe, U.S. Representative 1974–1976.
- Paul Hunt, comedian gymnast and gymnastics coach.
- Alejandra Ibáñez, 2020 Paralympic bronze medalist in women's wheelchair basketball.
- Darian Jenkins, soccer player
- Ken Jennings, 74 consecutive wins and $2.52 million in Jeopardy!
- Britton Johnsen, NBA basketball player
- Mark Koncar, NFL player for the Green Bay Packers and Houston Oilers
- Art Laboe, was an American-Armenian radio host, songwriter, record producer, and radio station owner. He was generally credited with coining the term "Oldies but Goodies".
- Golden Richards, former wide receiver for the Dallas Cowboys
- James Henry Madsen Paleontologist from University of Utah
- Chris Mazdzer, Olympic Luge silver medalist.
- Leonidas Ralph Mecham, former Director of the Administrative Office of the United States Courts
- Jerold Ottley, American music director and conductor. He served as the director of the Mormon Tabernacle Choir from 1974 to 1999.
- LaVern W. Parmley, LDS Church Primary President
- Kim Peek, inspiration for the character of Raymond Babbitt, played by Dustin Hoffman, in the movie Rain Man.
- Emily S. Richards national suffrage leader.
- Dan Snarr, four-time mayor of Murray
- Stan Watts, longtime head coach of BYU basketball team

== Newspapers ==
- American Eagle, Murray Eagle and The Green Sheet covered Murray from 1891 to the first decade of the 21st century.
- The Murray Journal covering Murray since early first decade of the 21st century.

== In the media ==
- American Idol featured Murray and Murray High School for David Archuleta's homecoming during season 7's finale. Mayor Dan Snarr's distinctive handlebar mustache received notice from show host Ryan Seacrest.
- Tiffany filmed parts of her video "I Think We're Alone Now" at Fashion Place Mall, 49th Street Galleria and Murray Park.
- Walt Disney Productions filmed four movies at Murray High School: A few of the scenes from the wrestling movie Take Down (1978). Read It and Weep (2006), the auditorium scene of High School Musical (2006), and Minutemen (2008) Disney used the Murray High School for the 2008 reality TV show High School Musical: Get in the Picture.
- The Real Housewives of Salt Lake City featured Heather Gay's Beauty Lab + Laser located in Murray. Jen Shah's arrest took place in the parking lot of the clinic.

== See also ==
- List of cities and towns in Utah
- Utopia community FTTH program
