= Henry J. Wheeler Farm =

- U.S. National Register of Historic Places
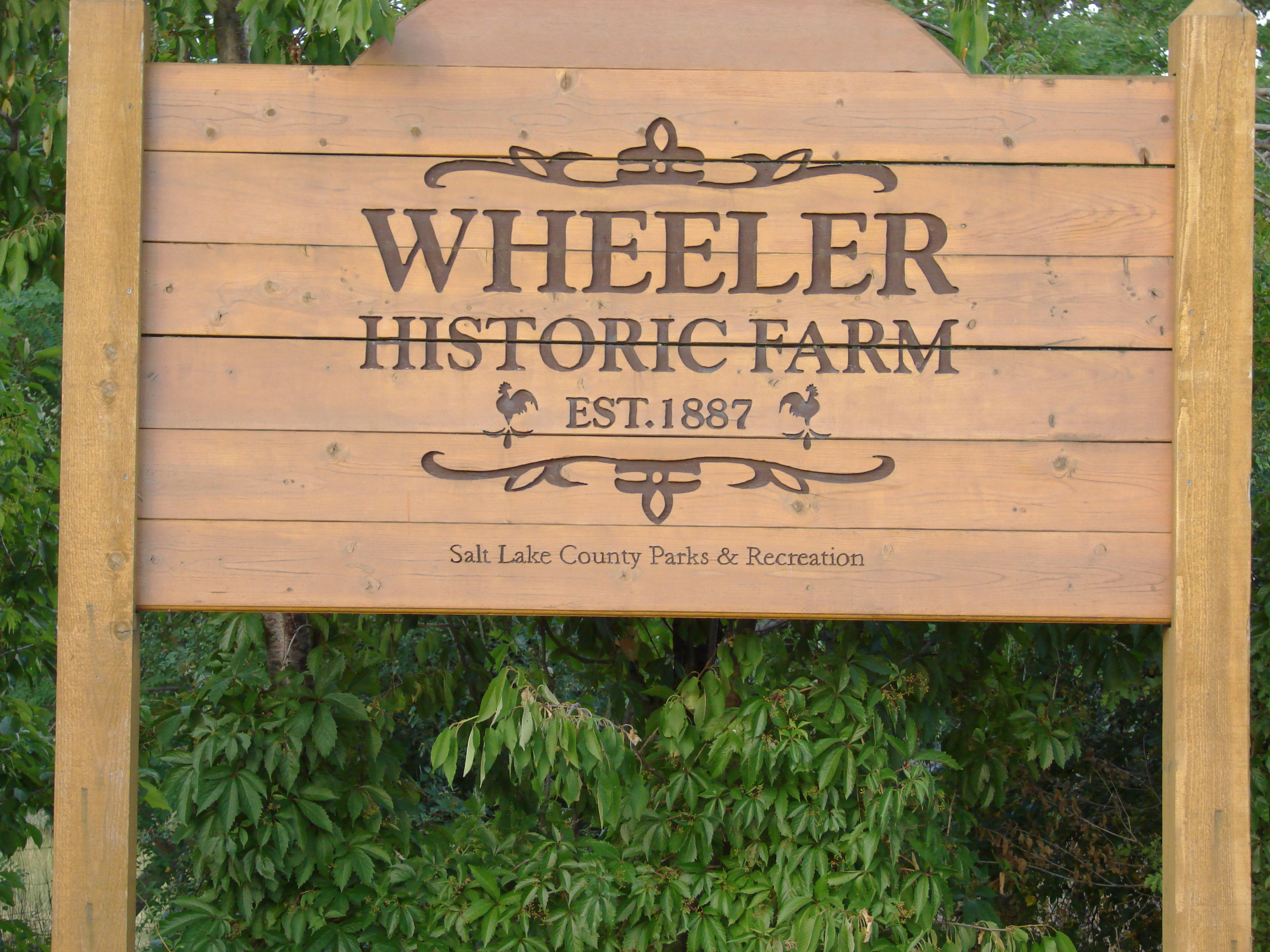
- Wheeler Historic Farm sign, June 2015

- Location within Utah Location within the United States
- Location: 6343 South 900 East; Murray, Utah; United States
- Coordinates: 40°38′3″N 111°51′42″W
- Area: 75 acres (30 ha)
- Built: 1898
- Architectural style: Late Victorian Style
- NRHP reference No.: 76001832
- Added to NRHP: May 4, 1976

The Henry J. Wheeler Farm is a farmstead in Murray, Utah, United States, that is one of the few remaining late 19th century farmsteads in the Salt Lake Valley that has not been lost to expanding housing developments of metropolitan Salt Lake City. It has been listed on the National Register of Historic Places since 1976.

== Description ==
The historic complex, situated on 75 acres (300,000 m^{2}), includes an adobe and brick home and several outbuildings, all constructed in 1898. There are, in addition to the home, a granary, ice house, chicken house, and work shed. A barn, also built in 1898, burned down in 1973. Together, this complex of buildings, along with the fences, trees, stream, ice ponds, roads, constitutes one of the few complete and operating historic farmsteads in the county. It is currently operated as the Wheeler Historic Farm by the Salt Lake County Parks and Recreation Department.

The farm was established by Henry J. Wheeler, the third son of English Mormon converts, who came to Utah in 1852. Born February 18, 1866, Henry grew up on his father's farm in the South Cottonwood (now Murray) area. In 1886, at the age of twenty, he married Sariah Pixton and established his own farm in the vicinity of his father's farm. The present brick home and several outbuildings were constructed in 1898 by Sid Gills and Hans Yorgensen. A Mr. Hayes, employed by the Sugar House Lumber Company, was the carpenter for the interior woodwork. The home, according to the 1902 publication, Biographical Record of Salt Lake City and Vicinity, "...was planned by Mrs. Wheeler and reflects great credit upon her knowledge of architecture, as it is not only homelike and convenient, but one of the prettiest little farm houses to be found in the county.”

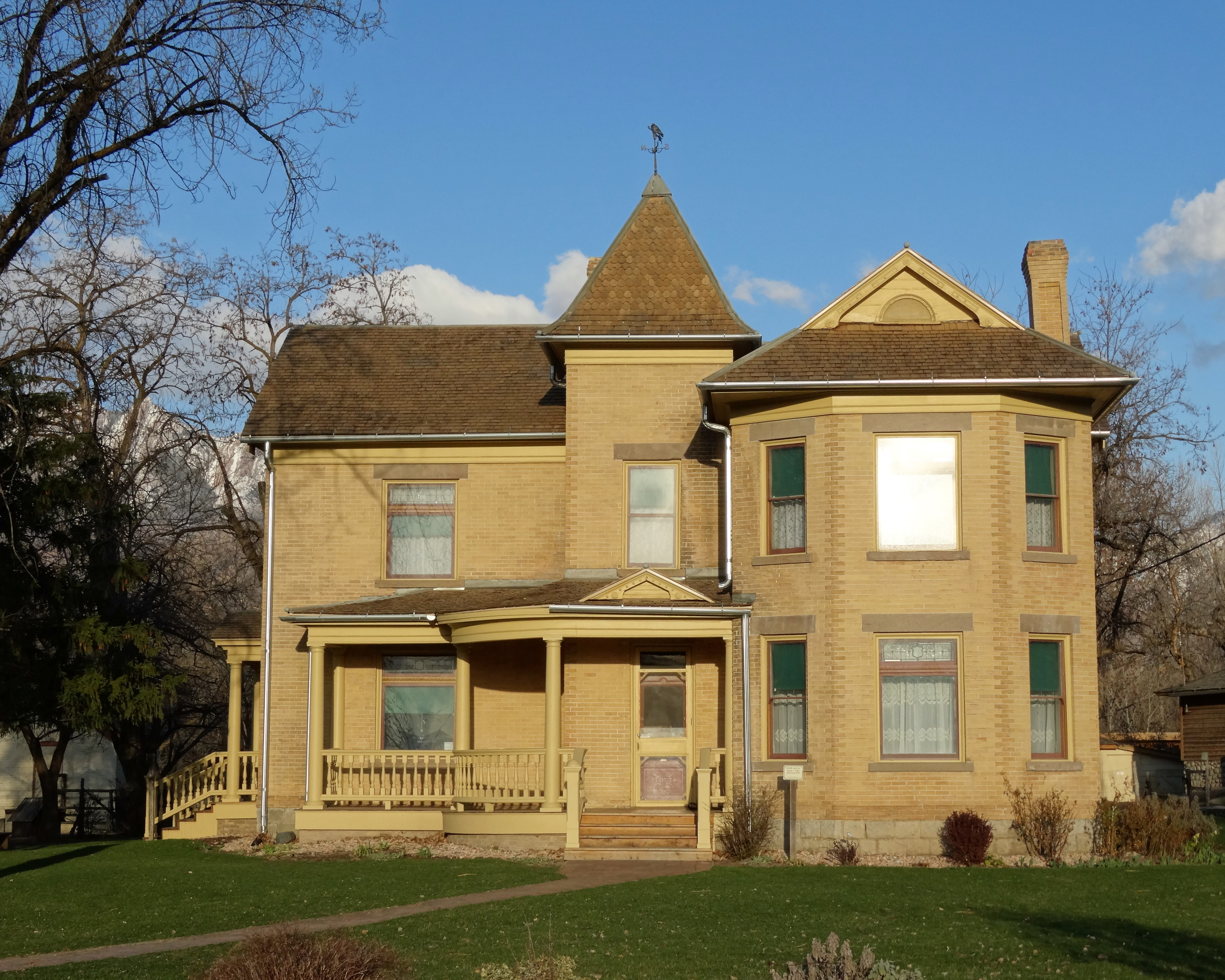
Wheeler farm house, March 2016

The house was built upon a granite foundation, the interior walls were made of adobe, much of which was taken from a previous residence, while the exterior walls were of ochre brick, later painted white. The Wheeler home is Victorian in style. The building is roughly L-shaped and has an entry tower at the nexus of the L, there were eleven rooms in the house. The bottom floor had a pantry, kitchen-dining area, and formal dining room, bathroom, living room, parlor, large staircase and hall. Upstairs were four bedrooms with walk-in closets and one large central storage closet. The interior was distinguished by its fine fireplaces, high ceilings, cherry and oak woodworking and staircase.

In 1969 Salt Lake County purchased the 75 acres (300,000 m^{2}) which comprise today's farm. Wheeler Historic Farm was placed on both the Utah State and National register of Historic Places in 1976. Originally started as a 1976 project of the United States Bicentennial of the American Revolution, the restored museum farm evolved into several buildings including a blacksmith shop, store, and reconstructed barn. An amphitheatre was installed in the 1980s, followed by a large "activity barn" in the 1990s that would function as a multi-purpose center. In the 2000s, Salt Lake County purchased remaining farmland south of the farm to create South Cottonwood Regional Park. Wheeler Farm is fully functional with farm animals and crops that are overseen by Utah State University's outreach programs. Granite School District uses the farm as an agricultural classroom for some of its vocational programs.

For the Current station of Wheeler Historic farm, look here: http://www.sevenslopes.com/wheeler-historic-farm/

== See also ==
- National Register of Historic Places listings in Salt Lake County, Utah
