= The Green Sheet =

- Type: Weekly newspaper
- Format: Broadsheet
- Owner: Various
- Publisher: Jeffrey Hatch (final print-edition publisher)
- Founded: 1891
- Ceased publication: Early 2000s
- Headquarters: 4768 South State; Murray, Utah 84107; United States
- Circulation: 25,000
- ISSN: 1074-9268
- Website: none

The American Eagle, later known also as Murray Eagle and The Green Sheet, was a newspaper that covered central Salt Lake Valley, especially the city of Murray, Utah.

== History ==
The beginnings of The American Eagle of Murray, Utah, are shrouded in mystery. The newspaper may have been published as early as 1891 as the American. Other sources list 1896 as the beginning publication date, before Murray was incorporated in 1903. The first known editor was Martin A. Willumsen. The Murray Eagle and Midvale Journal started out as the American Eagle. By 1908 the newspaper was named the Murray Eagle.

During the 1920s, Peter K. Nielsen, the editor and business manager, began to expand the newspaper's circulation area. P. K. Nielsen was foreman in the composing department of The Bikuben, the Danish paper of Salt Lake City. He was then with the Deseret News, at which time he became connected with the Eagle Publishing Company at Murray, which was then publishing only the American Eagle, with a subscription list of about four hundred and fifty. Since then the company took over or established the Sandy City Star, the Midvale Times and the Magna and Garfield Messenger with the total subscription becoming nearly three thousand. The paper maintained an independent political attitude.

Jim and Bette Cornwell came from Nebraska to purchase the Murray Eagle in the mid-1950s and from it spun off the Green Sheet, named for the tint of paper of the front page. Their weeklies supplemented the Salt Lake dailies by dealing with readers on a more local level than possible in the metropolitan press. They also helped give their communities an identity in the urban sprawl. The first green newspaper hit Murray's streets in 1960. Eventually, the paper forsook the green paper for traditional white due newsprint shortages and times when newsprint manufacturers didn't want to put green dye in their paper. Even being printed on white paper, the newspaper retained the Green Sheet name.

Cornwell, worked alongside his wife Bette to publish the Green Sheet once a week for another quarter of a century. The Cornwells sold out in 1984 to a young Eastern publisher, Peter Bernhard, a principal in Diversified Suburban Newspapers. Bernhard was for several years an absentee owner; busy running other papers in Alameda and Oakland, California. Even after Cornwell sold the paper in 1984, the local news tint of choice remained green for 10 more years until the Murray Eagle was sold to another owner in 1995.

Jeffrey B. Hatch, the former president and general manager of KUTV Television in Salt Lake City, joined John N. Ward, an independent public relations consultant and member of the Murray City Council in purchasing the newspaper and returned the Murray Eagle name back to the Green Sheet, the name it published under in the 1970s-1980s.

The Murray Green Sheet had home delivery, and combined circulation of 24,500. The papers were free except for mail subscriptions. The Green Sheet eventually folded in the early 2000s. Two notable journalists wrote for the Murray Eagle. Pulitzer Prize winning columnist Jack Anderson began his career as a teenage journalist covering Murray's local beat. He eventually worked for the Washington Post and was known for his muckraking columns, especially during the Richard Nixon/Watergate era. Ethel Bradford was a favorite local columnist who received national recognition for her folksy views in her "Out My Window" column.
