= Murray Downtown Historic District =

Historic district in Utah, United States

- U.S. National Register of Historic Places
- U.S. Historic district
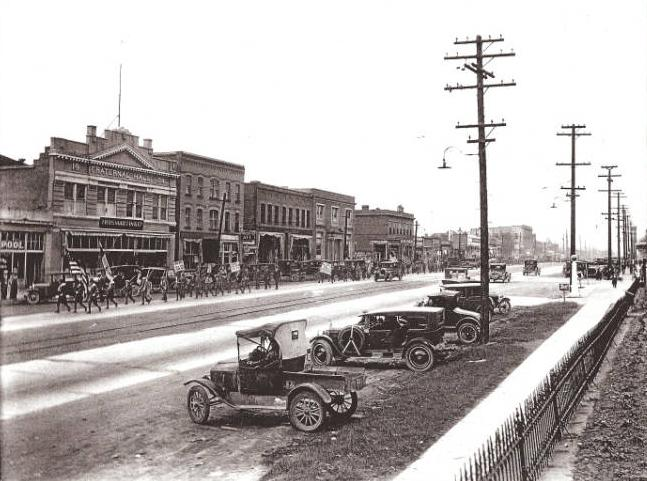
- Downtown Murray City, Circa 1920

- Location within Utah Location within the United States
- Location: Roughly bounded by 4800 South, Poplar St., Vine St. and Center St., Murray, Utah
- Coordinates: 40°40′4″N 111°53′18″W
- Area: 20 acres (8.1 ha)
- Built: 1898
- Architectural style: Late Victorian Style/Art Moderne
- NRHP reference No.: 06000928
- Added to NRHP: September 26, 2006

The Murray Downtown Historic District is located in the historic city center of Murray, Salt Lake County, Utah. It was listed on the National Register of Historic Places in 2006.

The historic district is significant for its association with the development, particularly economic and social, of the community from a rural outpost to an industrialized city with a remarkably urban core in its commercial district. Murray is one of only a few towns in Utah and the only community in the Salt Lake Valley, other than Salt Lake City, to have substantial mixed commercial/residential development with resident population living in the upper floors of commercial buildings. The population of Murray's urban center was remarkable for its integrated mix of Utah-born residents and recent immigrants attracted by the smelter industry. The tight urban streetscape along State Street between approximately 4800 South Street (formerly Murray Boulevard) and Vine Street is a distinctive reminder of the heyday of Murray's commercial importance in the south-central part of the valley. The district is also significant as an urban streetscape and for the architectural variety and quality of the individual buildings, three of which were individually listed on the National Register. Many of the buildings are particularly noteworthy as examples of the evolution of the modern Main Street, in Murray's case, State Street. Between the 1920s and 1950s, the storefronts of numerous buildings were updated to reflect the changes in America's architectural tastes.

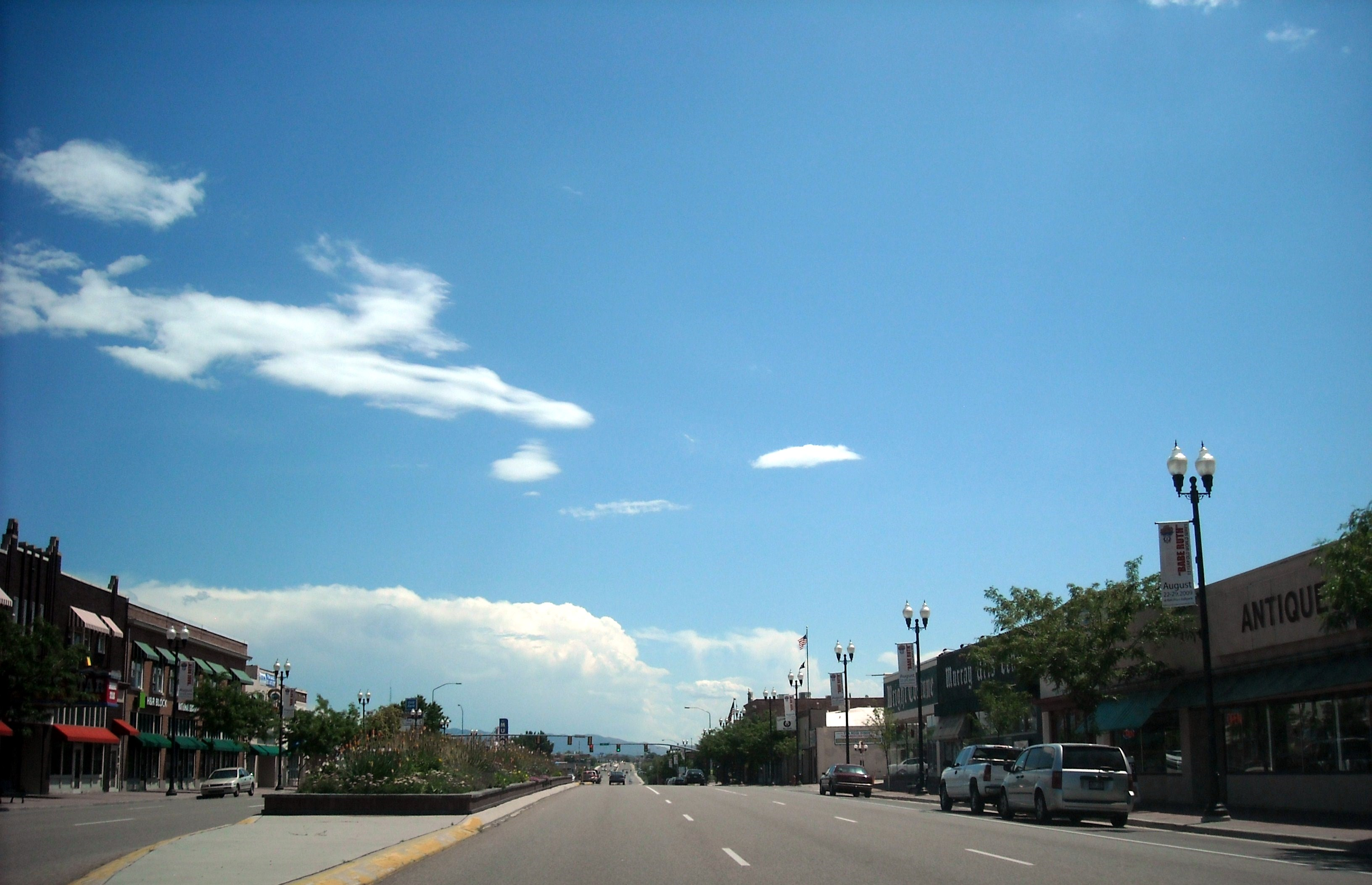
Downtown Murray, present day

The contributing buildings represent Murray's major historic construction phases, and have good integrity for the historic period, which ranges from 1897 to approximately 1956. The commercial business district is a companion to the Murray Downtown Residential Historic District, which abuts the business district on the east and was listed on the National Register of Historic Places in 2005.

The district includes three buildings previously listed on the National Register of Historic Places: the Warenski-Duvall Commercial Building and Apartments; the Iris Theater (Desert Star Theater), Apartments, and Commercial Building; and the Murray Theater.
