= Big Cottonwood Park =

Public park in Utah, USA

Big Cottonwood Regional Park
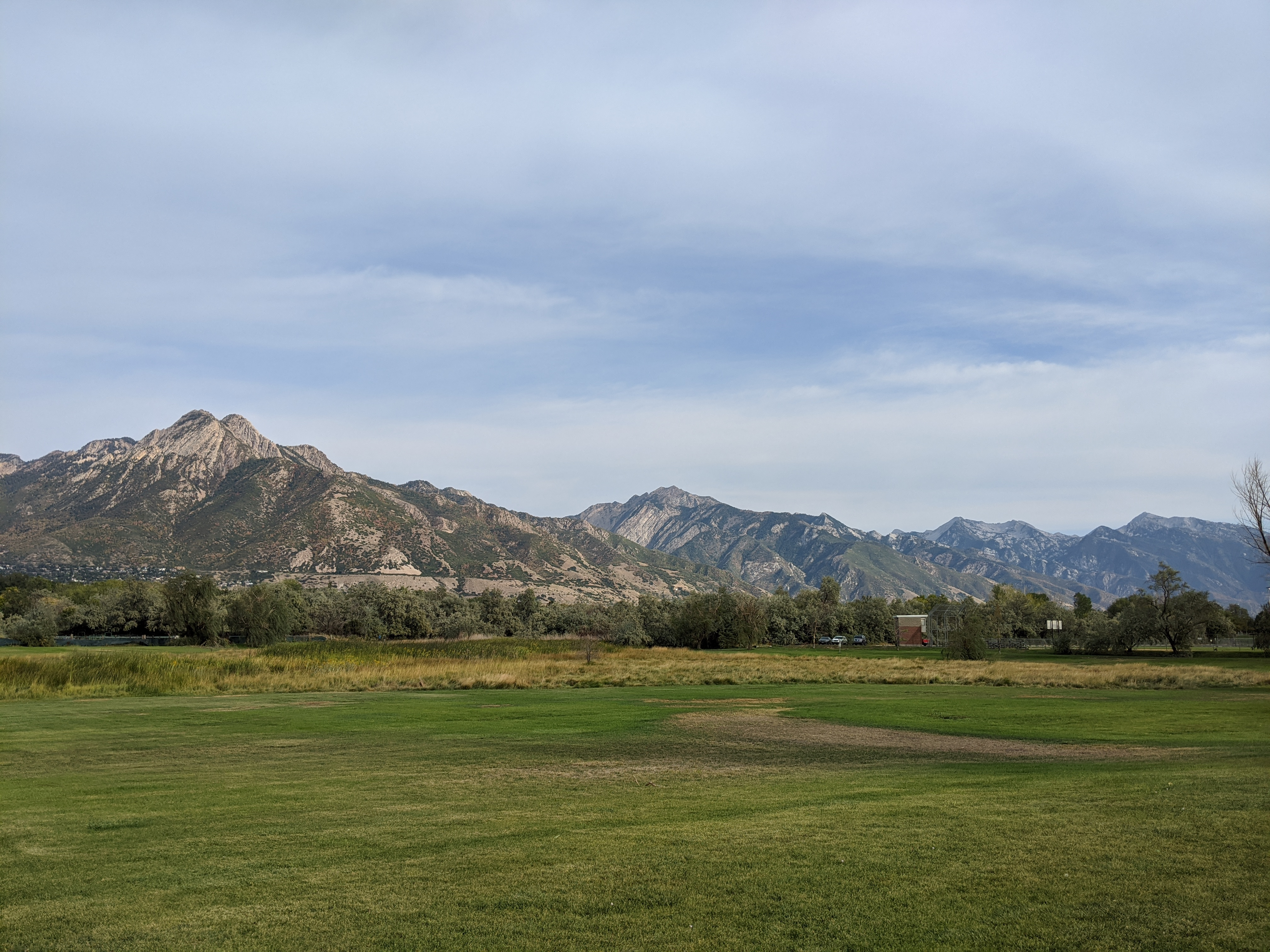
- Big Cottonwood Regional Park, Holladay Lions Area
- Interactive map of Big Cottonwood Regional Park
- Type: urban park
- Location: Millcreek, Utah; Holladay, Utah
- Nearest city: Salt Lake City, Utah
- Coordinates: 40.6789°N 111.8572°W
- Area: 123.1 acres (49.8 ha)

Big Cottonwood Regional Park is a public park located around Holladay and Millcreek, Salt Lake County, Utah. It consists of three separate areas: Big Cottonwood Area (47.5 acres), Creekside Area (37.8 acres), and Holladay Lions Area (37.8 acres). The park features the Larry H. Miller Softball Complex, volleyball courts, pavilions, playgrounds, and walking paths. The Big Cottonwood Regional Park Outer Loop is a 1.2 miles (1.9 km) looping trail, which allows dogs on leashes.

In 2020, it was one of three Salt Lake City parks included in the Salt Lake County Animal Services' Good Dog awareness campaign, which aimed to educate dog owners about safety, laws, and ordinances concerning pets.
