= Wheeler Farm =

- Location within Massachusetts
- Town/City: Lincoln
- State: Massachusetts
- Country: United States
- Coordinates: 42.42739°N 71.30144°W
- Owner: Rural Land Foundation (since 1965)
- Area: 54 acres (220,000 m^{2})

Wheeler Farm is a historic farm in Lincoln, Massachusetts, United States. Settled in 1717, it was farmed for almost 250 years. Covering 54 acres (22 ha), it is now owned by the Rural Land Foundation (RLF), which was formed in 1965, after the property was placed on the market.

== History ==
The 1965 sale of the property is believed to have been the first limited-development strategy of conversation planning in the country, in that the eleven private-home lots are clustered to ensure the maximum amount of land can be protected.

Abner, Benjamin and Eliphalet lived at the farm in the 18th century. Stephen Buttrick (1772–1828), son of John, lived at the farm in the 19th century.
