= Murray Theater (Murray, Utah) =

- U.S. National Register of Historic Places
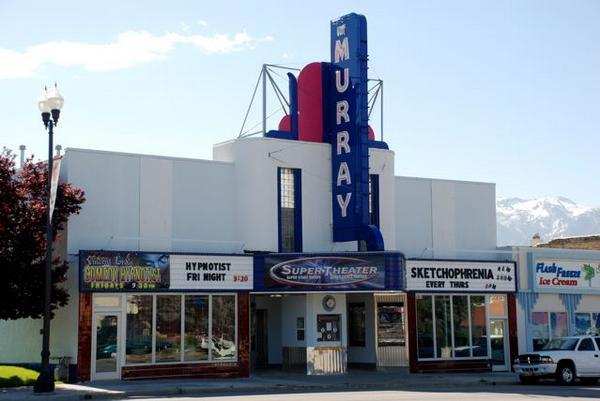
- Murray Theater

- Location within Utah Location within the United States
- Location: 4961 South State Street Murray, Utah
- Coordinates: 40°39′50″N 111°53′17″W
- Area: .31 acres (0.13 ha)
- Built: 1938
- Architectural style: Art Moderne
- NRHP reference No.: 01000476

The Murray Theater is a theater located in Murray, Utah. It is listed on the National Register of Historic Places, and is one of the area's best examples of the Art Moderne style in theater architecture. The theater operated as both a first-run and second-run venue for motion pictures, and has been extensively renovated and redesigned during its history.

== History ==
The Murray Theater, located at 4961 South State Street in Murray, Utah, was built in 1938 by Tony Duvall, who built the Gem and New Iris theaters in Murray, and Joseph L. Lawrence, who built the Villa and Southeast in Salt Lake and the Academy in Provo. It opened on 28 October, 1938, showing “Alexander’s Ragtime Band” and “Hawaiian Holiday”. Advertisements from local papers show that it screened two of Hollywood's first major color films: Gone with the Wind and The Wizard of Oz.

The Murray Eagle reported “The white front of this beautiful theater will be amply lighted with the latest type of tube lighting and the marquee and vertical sign will be trimmed in ruby red. The box office and entrance has been finished in stainless steel. The lighting in the foyer and inner lobby is all in indirect tubing and is designed to blend harmoniously with the delicate wall decorations and the heavy red floor carpets. The spacious auditorium is fitted with full upholstered chairs which are so situated that every patron may have an unobstructed view of the screen. The auditorium is also lighted with concealed tubing. The aisles are five and one half feet wide. The latest Mirrophonic sound system and projection equipment has been installed. The whole theater has been completely air-conditioned so that a complete change of air may be made every three minutes. A cooling system will provide for the comfort of the patrons in the summer months. The restrooms are large and nicely fitted with an ultra modern lounge provided for the ladies.” In September 1964, Art M. Jolley purchased the Murray from Fox-Intermountain Theaters. By the end of January 1965 he completed a $15,000 “modernization program” on the theater. In 1981, Mr. Jolley sold the Murray to another party, but later he took the theater back. In 1989, after the death of Art Jolley, the Jolley family sold the theater to his son-in-law, Steve Webb. Steve Webb operated the Murray as a second-run theater, with the help of his wife and children, and his brother. The Murray closed for two days, starting 28 October, 1992, so the stage could be enlarged to accommodate live performances. Vandermeide, who had been performing at the Avalon, then moved his hypnotist show to the Murray. In October 1999 the Murray Theater closed suddenly. The theater was to be auctioned in February 2000.

In October 2001, the Murray Theater was bought by the Murray Unity Spiritual Center. The interior was remodeled with a bookstore, a Sunday School, a prayer room, and a new coffee shop. The auditorium became a 550-seat sanctuary. The Unity Spiritual Center vacated the theater in the summer of 2004 and the theater. In early 2006 the theater was remodeled as a live entertainment and dancing venue with a new stage, extensive sound, light and video technology and tiered seating platforms with a large dance floor. A pizza restaurant, built in a connected building to the south of the theater operated as a part of the theater enterprise. In December 2007, the theater was named the Murray Super Theater and hosted a variety of musical acts cultural events, private parties, and wrestling venue. The owners of the Murray Super Theater folded operations during the Great Recession.

In 2015, Murray City bought the theater and incorporated it as part of its Murray City Center District redevelopment zone. The City announced in 2018 that it was investing in significant renovations to the theater to become a film and performance venue.

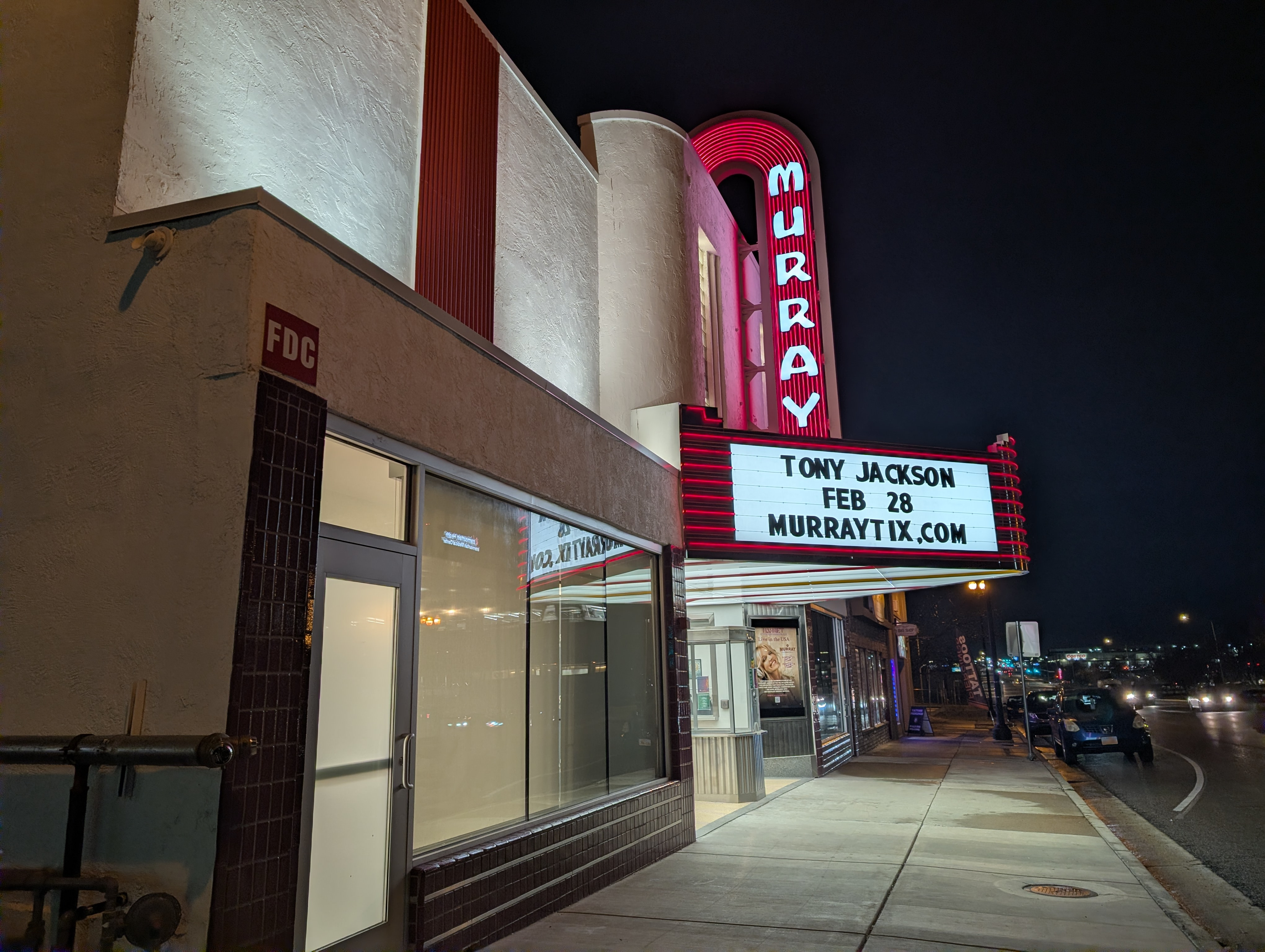
Murray Theater after Renovations

Due to delays and funding complications, the renovation by Murray City had been delayed. There were multiple opening dates between 2020 and 2025. There was hope that it would be open for the 2025 Sundance Film Festival, however complications arose as there was water discovered under the stage and house of the auditorium.

The theater reopened on 26 September, 2025 under the management of Katie Lindquist. Salt Lake County Mayor Jenny Wilson and Murray City Mayor Brett Hales delivered opening remarks, followed by performances from Homestead Circus and Loren Allred. Murray City Cultural Arts presented a documentary on the history of the theater.
