= Murray City Park =

Public park in Murray, Utah, U.S.

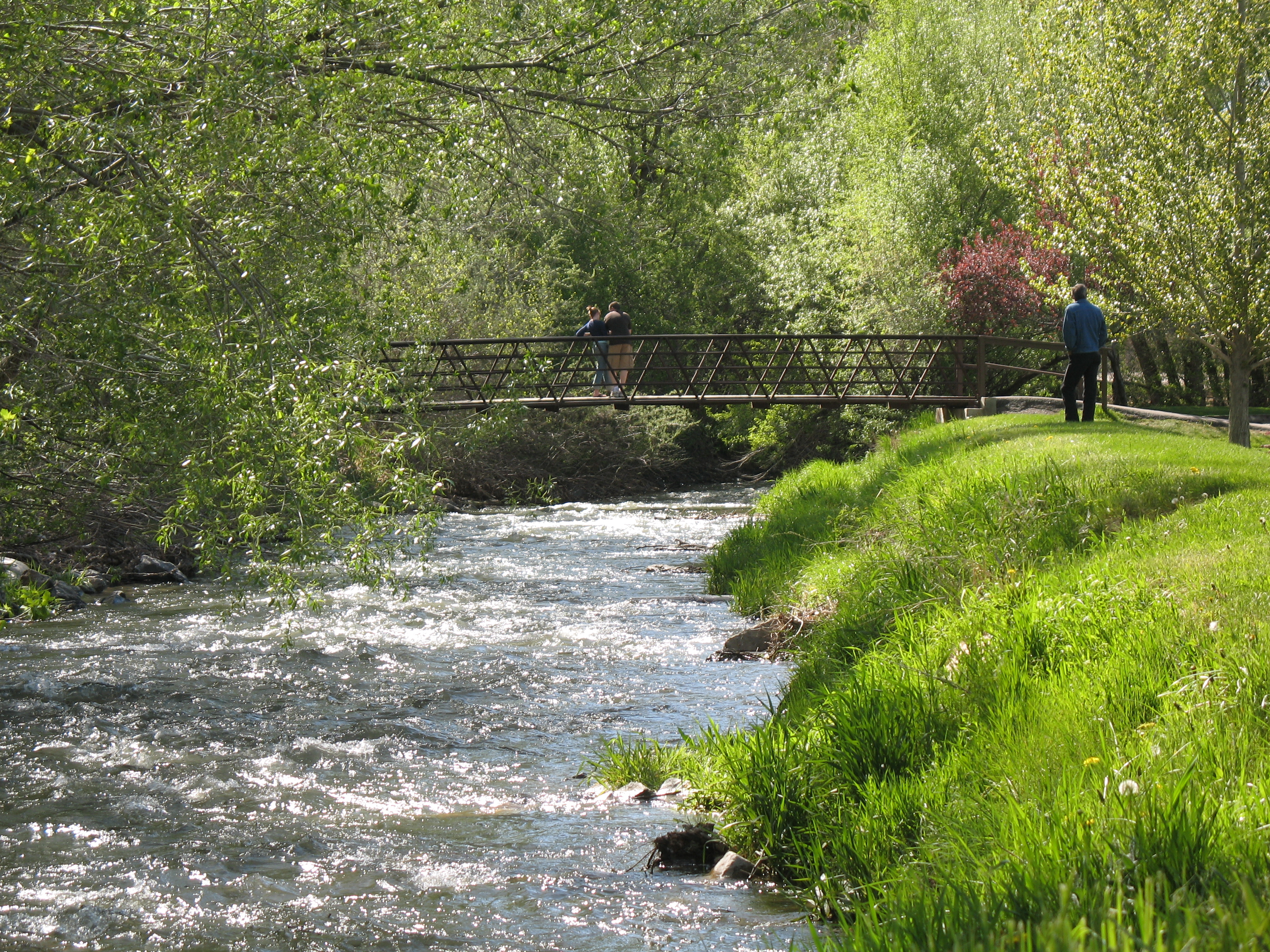
- Little Cottonwood Creek in Murray Park
- Interactive map of Murray City Park
- Type: Urban Park
- Location: Murray, Utah, United States
- Coordinates: 40°39′30″N 111°52′50″W

Murray City Park (or Murray Park) is a public urban park located in and operated by the city of Murray, Utah, USA.

== Features ==
Murray City Park's most recognizable feature is a large wooden sculpture of Chief Wasatch, a fictional composite of local tribes, by artist Peter Wolf Toth, standing at the main entrance of the park on State Street and 5100 South.

There are numerous public facilities including an outdoor amphitheater, an outdoor swimming pool, an outdoor ice rink, an arboretum, a rugby field, a softball field, a soccer field, multipurpose fields, a gazebo, playgrounds, picnic sites with barbecue grills, hiking trails, restrooms, and five pavilions.

The Boys and Girls Club of Murray is located in the park.

=== The Park Center ===
The Park Center is a recreation center at the south end of the park with indoor pools, including a kid's splash pool with slides, a "lazy river" float area, and colorful play equipment. The center also has an elevated track, two full-size basketball courts, a weight room, and a cardio area and a game room. Child care is available for children ages infant through 12.

=== Ken Price Ballpark ===
Ken Price Ballpark is a 3,000 seat baseball stadium located at the park that hosts the Murray High School team's home games, as well as Utah High School state championships and other tournaments.

=== County Ice Center ===
The County Ice Center is an indoor ice rink located in Murray Park, it regularly plays home to several local ice hockey and figure skating events, as well as commonly being open for public ice skating and skate lessons.

== History ==
The park used to house the Salt Lake County Fairgrounds, until newer facilities were built in South Jordan.
