= Little Cottonwood Creek (Salt Lake County, Utah) =

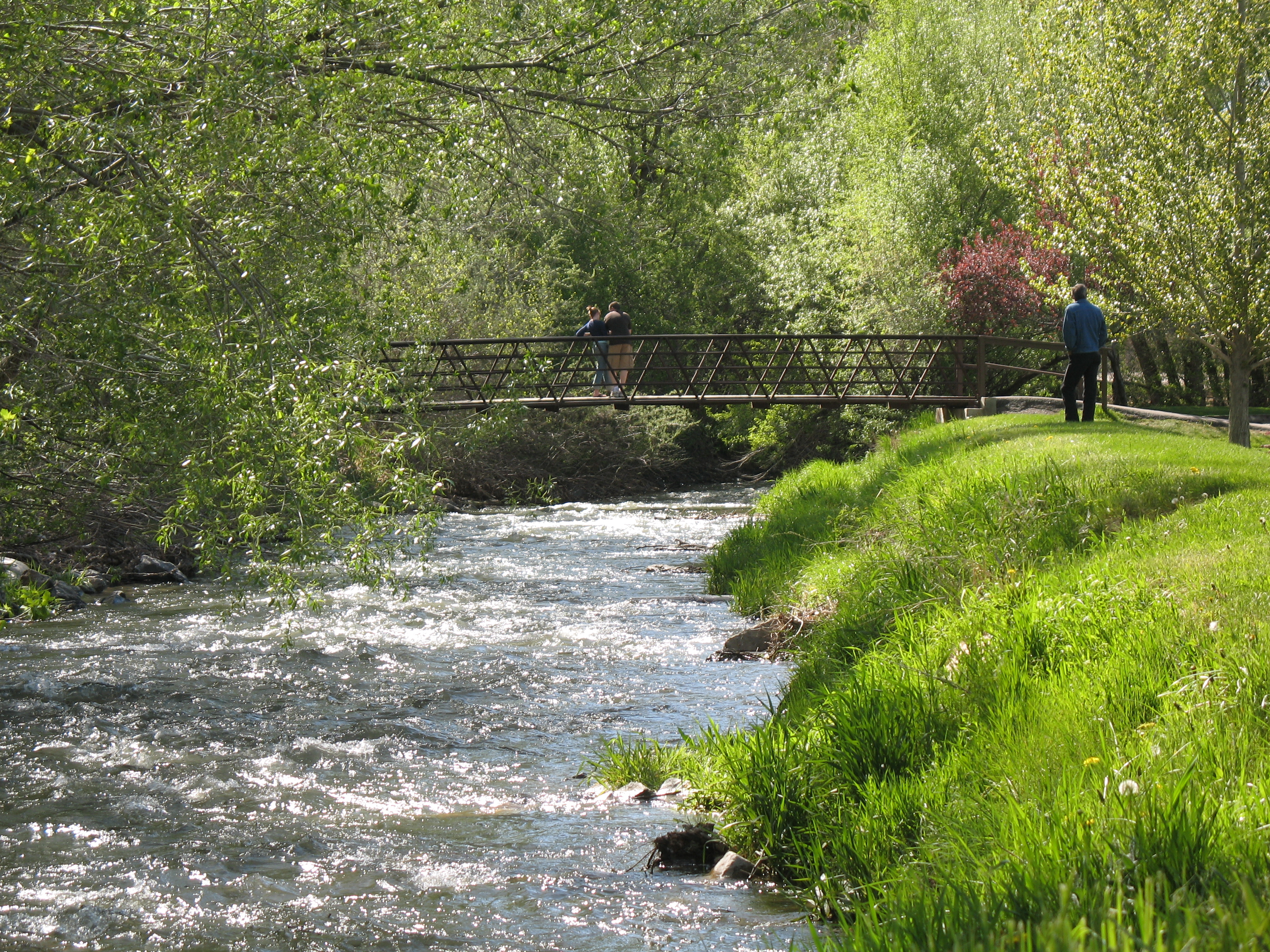
- The Little Cottonwood Creek in Murray City Park, Murray, Utah

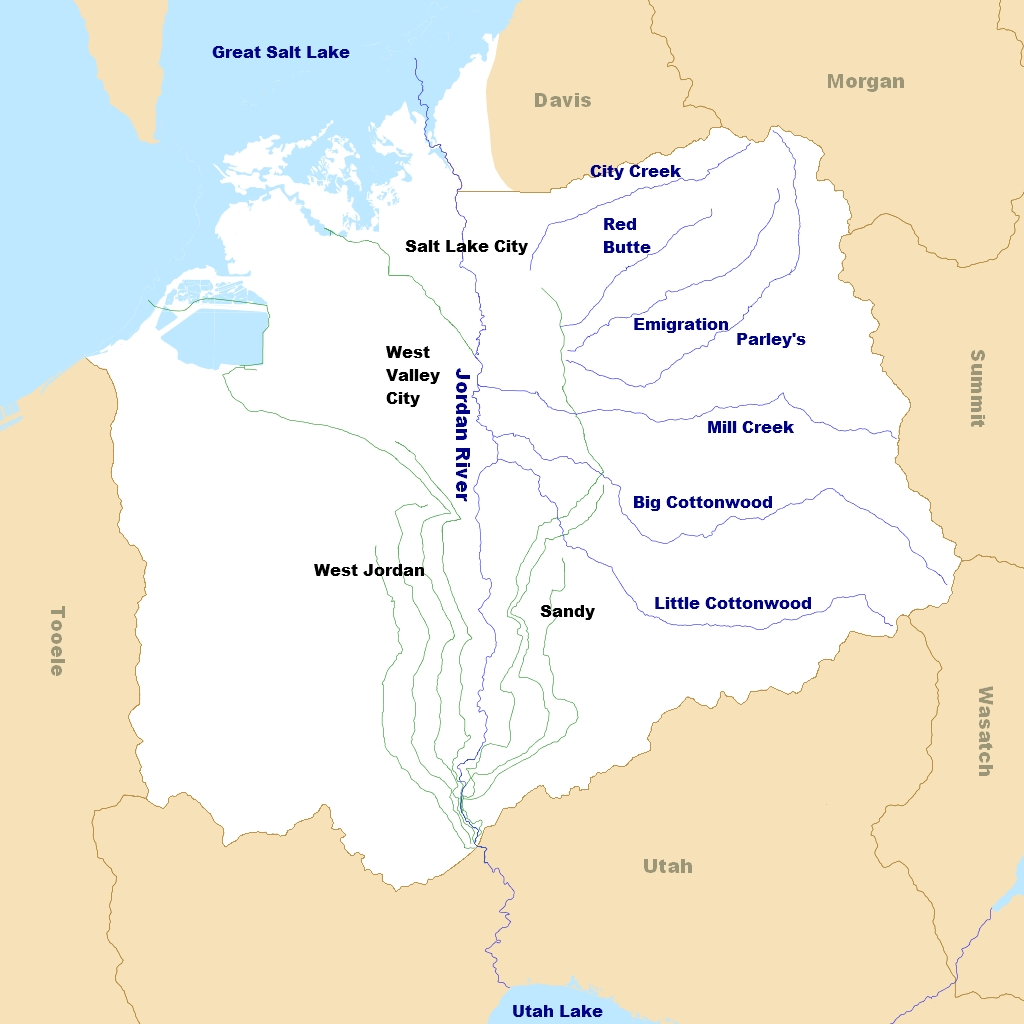
- Little Cottonwood Creek and other Salt Lake County streams

Location
- Country: United States
- State: Utah

Physical characteristics
- Source
  - location: Cecret Lake, Alta, Utah, Salt Lake County, Utah
  - coordinates: 40°34′12″N 111°37′19.2″W
  - elevation: 11,500 ft (3,500 m)
- Mouth: Jordan River
  - location: Murray, Utah, Salt Lake County, Utah
  - coordinates: 40°39′57″N 111°54′27″W
  - elevation: 4,490 ft (1,370 m)
- Length: 27.72 mi (44.61 km)
- Basin size: 46 sq mi (120 km^{2})
- Discharge
  - location: Murray, Utah
  - average: 111 cu ft/s (3.1 m^{3}/s)
  - minimum: 99 cu ft/s (2.8 m^{3}/s)
  - maximum: 5,290 cu ft/s (150 m^{3}/s)

Little Cottonwood Creek is one of the principal streams entering Salt Lake Valley from the east. The creek rises near the summit of the Wasatch Mountains, a short distance south of the ski resort town of Alta, and flows in a westerly direction through Little Cottonwood Canyon until it emerges into Salt Lake Valley about eleven miles from its source. Thence its course is north westerly through Sandy, Midvale and Murray, Utah until it empties into the Jordan River, about six miles south of Salt Lake City. Its whole length is nearly 27 miles (43 km). The headwaters of Little Cottonwood Creek are in Little Cottonwood Canyon, a glaciated canyon in Uinta-Wasatch-Cache National Forest and the Wasatch and Uinta Mountains eco-region. One of the main tributaries of the creek rises in Cecret Lake, a small sheet of water situated near Alta. The entire Little Cottonwood Creek drainage basin encompasses 46 square miles (120 km^{2}), ranging in elevation from about 4,490 to 11,500 feet (1,370 to 3,510 m).

Communities were founded around the creek soon after the pioneer settlement of Salt Lake Valley in 1847 and supported agricultural activities. Following the discovery of gold, silver, copper, and lead in nearby canyons in the 1870s, ore-refining activities brought an influx of people to these communities. During the mid-to the late 1900s, residential land use replaced agriculture as the dominant land-use type in the lower Little Cottonwood Creek drainage basin as the population of Salt Lake Valley expanded.

Land cover upstream from the mouth of Little Cottonwood Canyon is 60 percent forest land and 33 percent rangeland. The watershed in Little Cottonwood Canyon is protected as a drinking water source but receives extensive recreational use. The urbanized part of the Little Cottonwood Creek drainage basin includes that part from the mouth of Little Cottonwood Canyon to the confluence with the Jordan River. The stream provides electrical power generation for Murray City.

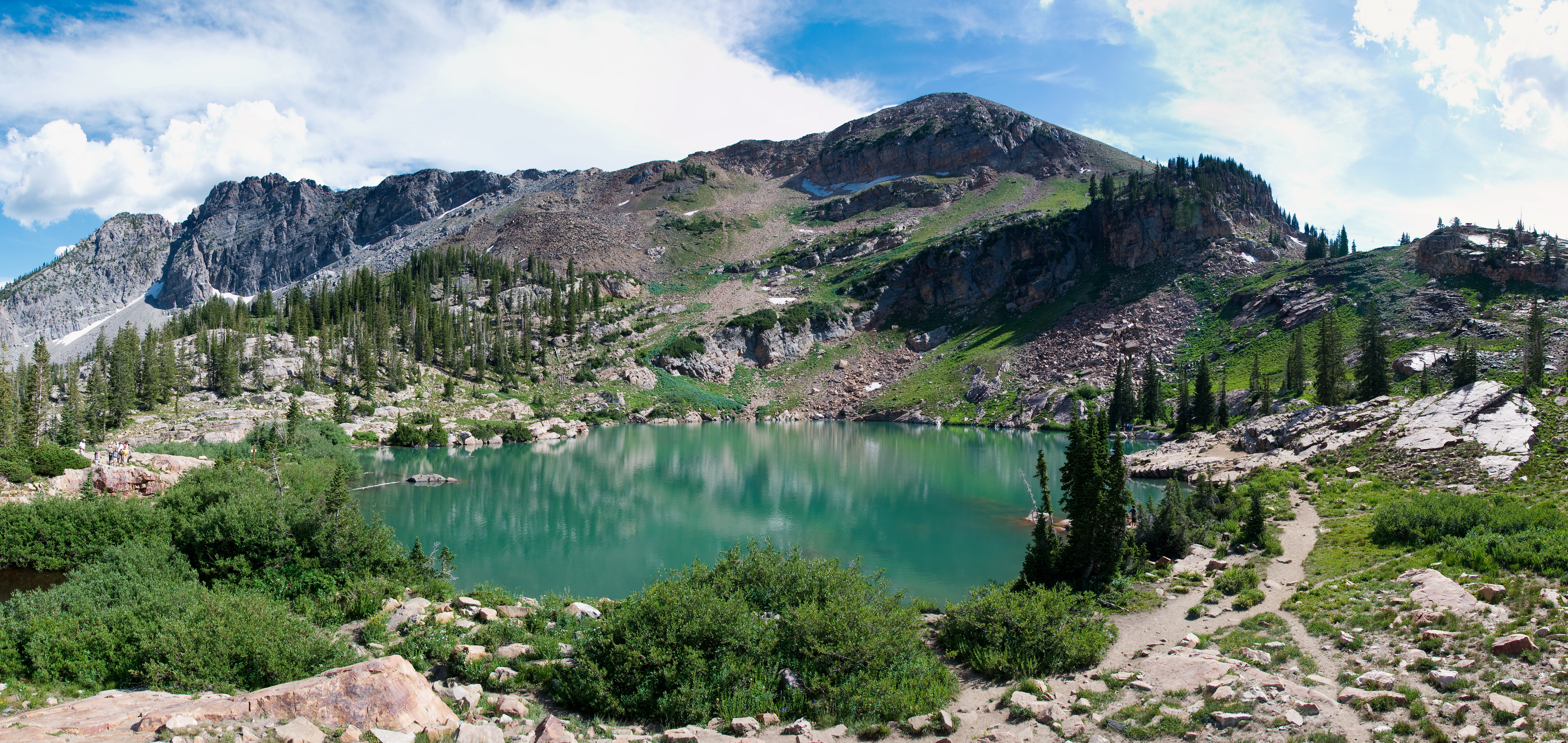
Cecret Lake, headwater of Little Cottonwood Creek

The first legitimate mining operation in Little Cottonwood Canyon was established in 1865. The ore deposits in Little Cottonwood Canyon yielded principally silver and lead with some copper, gold, and zinc. These ore deposits were formed mainly in shale, limestone, and dolomite. Galena or lead sulfide was the common primary lead mineral of the area. Argentite was found in most primary ores and was probably an abundant primary silver mineral. Ore production varied with time because of the nature of the deposits and the scattered control of holdings. The 1870s were especially productive when rich deposits were mined. Several smelters operated along Little Cottonwood Creek during the 1870s. Smelting operations produced a variety of by-products that included arsenic, matte, arsenical speiss, and slag.

Past mining activities and ore-smelting operations continue to influence the water chemistry of the stream. Mine and smelter tailings in the Little Cottonwood Creek drainage basin can contribute trace metals to the stream. Metals from fluvial tailings deposits in the stream can be re-suspended and dissolved in the stream. Currently, the greatest threat to the streams ecosystem is pesticides from residential run-off.

== Hydrology ==
The hydrology of the urbanized reach of Little Cottonwood Creek is highly variable and complex because of the canals and diversion structures employed by different water users. Source water for the urban reach of Little Cottonwood Creek varies spatially and seasonally. Sources include snowmelt, stormwater, groundwater, irrigation return, and water imported from the Jordan River. The effect that each of these sources has on stream quality varies seasonally and with stream flow. About 85 percent of the runoff at the mouth of Little Cottonwood Creek was from snowmelt.

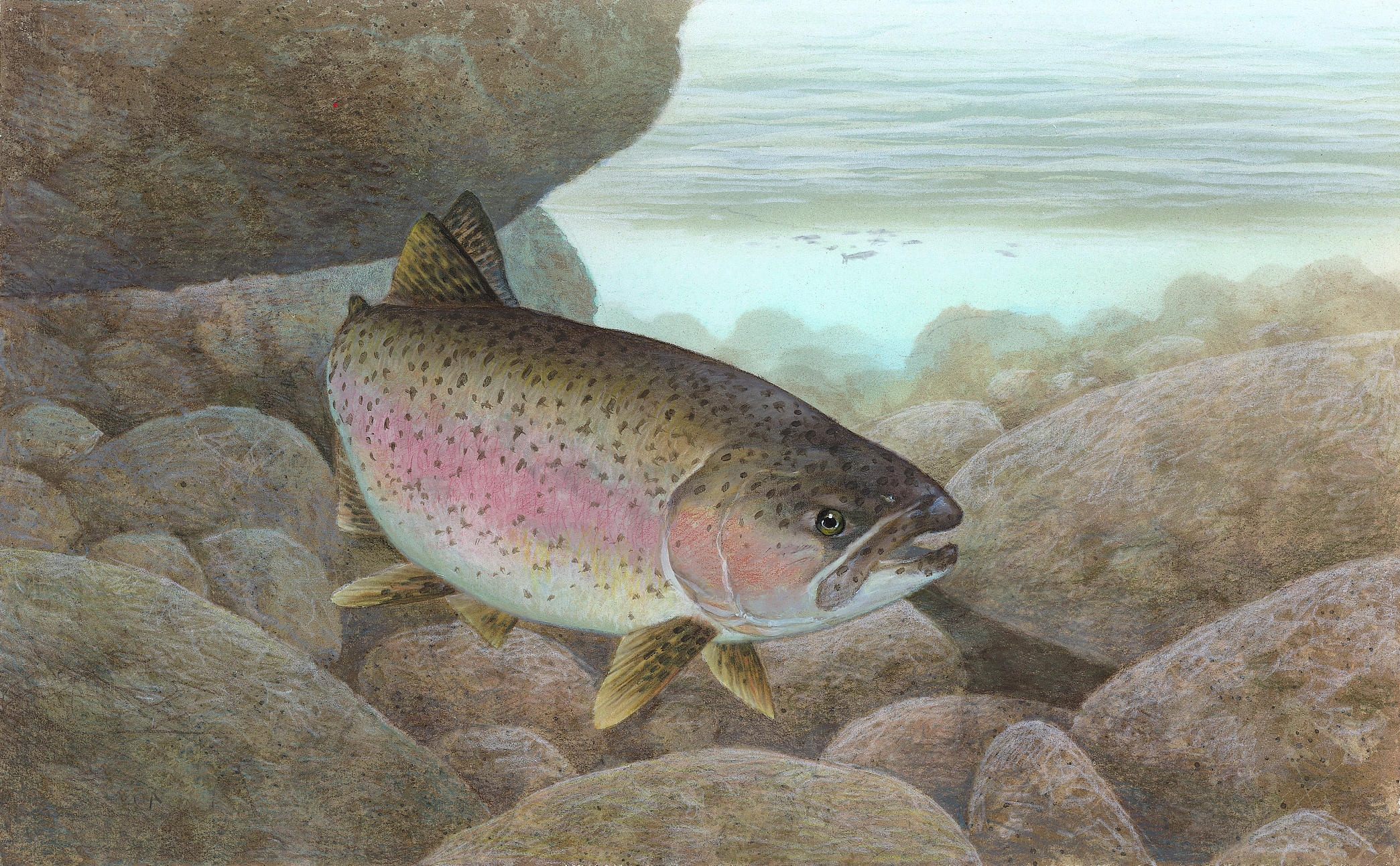
Rainbow trout, commonly found in Little Cottonwood Creek.

The hydrology of Little Cottonwood Creek is typical of that of many urban streams along the Wasatch Front and in the Intermountain West. A system of diversions for withdrawal of irrigation water began to be developed on many Wasatch Front streams soon after settlers arrived in Salt Lake Valley in 1847. As the population of the Wasatch Front increased, more of the water in valley streams was needed for drinking and domestic purposes. To meet domestic needs, water is withdrawn from several Wasatch Front streams, including Little Cottonwood Creek, as they emerge from headwater canyons and enter Salt Lake Valley. The water needs of irrigators downstream from the canyon mouths are satisfied with water diverted out of the Jordan River and transported across the valley in a system of canals. Some of the water from the Jordan River is imported to the urbanized reach of Little Cottonwood Creek.

The flood stage for the urban waterways is 5.7 feet (1.7 m). Notable flooding is rare, with significant flooding in 1983 and as recently as the summer of 2010, when the waterline was 6.3 feet (1.9 m) above bank level.

== Fauna ==
The Utah Division of Wildlife Resources stocks the creek with 1,000 trout yearly. The trout are primarily rainbow and Bonneville cutthroat trout. As the higher elevations of the creek still are affected by early mining operations, there is a little carryover from each year’s stocking.

== See also ==
- List of rivers of Utah
