= National Register of Historic Places listings in Salt Lake County, Utah =

Location of Salt Lake County in Utah

This is a list of the National Register of Historic Places listings in Salt Lake County, Utah, except those in Salt Lake City. Listings for Salt Lake City can be found here.

This is intended to be a complete list of the properties and districts on the National Register of Historic Places in Salt Lake County, Utah, United States. Latitude and longitude coordinates are provided for many National Register properties and districts; these locations may be seen together in a map.

There are more than 350 properties and districts listed on the National Register in the county, including six National Historic Landmarks. More than 200 of these sites, including four National Historic Landmarks, are located in Salt Lake City, and are listed separately; the 155 sites outside the city, including two National Historic Landmarks, are listed here. Six other sites in the county outside of Salt Lake City were once listed on the Register, but have been removed.

This National Park Service list is complete through NPS recent listings posted October 16, 2026.

== Current listings ==
	Name on the Register	Image	Date listed	Location	City or town	Description
1	J. R. Allen House	J. R. Allen House	August 28, 1980 (#80003912)	1047 E. 13200 South; 40°30′44″N 111°51′41″W	Draper	
2	Allsop-Jensen House	Allsop-Jensen House	August 8, 1996 (#96000885)	8829 S. 400 East; 40°35′29″N 111°52′48″W	Sandy	House and log barn behind
3	Dyre and Maria Amundsen House	Dyre and Maria Amundsen House	April 6, 2015 (#15000131)	307 E. Winchester St. 40°38′00″N 111°52′54″W	Murray	
4	Thomas and Beda Anderberg House	Thomas and Beda Anderberg House	December 30, 2004 (#04001420)	28 E. Pioneer Ave. (8530 South); 40°35′46″N 111°53′24″W	Sandy	
5	Alfred C. and Annie L. Olsen Anderson House	Alfred C. and Annie L. Olsen Anderson House	December 9, 1999 (#99001556)	8850 S. 60 East; 40°35′27″N 111°53′17″W	Sandy	
6	Charles M. and Fannie M. Allsop Anderson House	Charles M. and Fannie M. Allsop Anderson House	December 9, 1999 (#99001558)	498 E. Locust St. 40°35′24″N 111°52′43″W	Sandy	
7	Frederick C. and Anna Anderson House	Frederick C. and Anna Anderson House	July 9, 1997 (#97000641)	8650 S. Center St. 40°35′38″N 111°53′06″W	Sandy	
8	John A. Anderson House	John A. Anderson House	August 28, 1992 (#92001066)	510 E. 8800 South; 40°35′29″N 111°52′34″W	Sandy	
9	Y. Martin and Hannah Nelson Anderson House	Y. Martin and Hannah Nelson Anderson House	December 9, 1999 (#99001549)	8832 S. 90 East; 40°35′28″N 111°53′11″W	Sandy	
10	Nathaniel Baldwin House	Nathaniel Baldwin House	May 9, 1985 (#85000963)	2374 E. Evergreen Ave. 40°41′47″N 111°49′20″W	Millcreek	
11	Bateman Agriculture and Development Company	Bateman Agriculture and Development Company	August 8, 1996 (#96000888)	198 E. 8760 South; 40°35′31″N 111°53′00″W	Sandy	
12	Burtch W. Jr. and Susan Beall House	Burtch W. Jr. and Susan Beall House	April 12, 2021 (#100006366)	4644 South Brookwood Cir. 40°40′10″N 111°51′32″W	Millcreek	
13	Reid Beck House	Reid Beck House	January 27, 2012 (#11001067)	12542 S. 900 East; 40°31′22″N 111°52′01″W	Draper	part of the Draper, Utah Multiple Property Submission
14	Beckstead-Butterfield House	Beckstead-Butterfield House	April 12, 2021 (#100006389)	13032 South Redwood Rd. 40°30′51″N 111°56′19″W	Riverton	
15	Amanda Conk Best House	Amanda Conk Best House	December 4, 2008 (#08001154)	3622 S. 1100 East; 40°41′33″N 111°51′36″W	Millcreek	
16	Bingham Canyon Open Pit Copper Mine	Bingham Canyon Open Pit Copper Mine	November 13, 1966 (#66000736)	16 miles (26 km) southwest of Salt Lake City on State Route 48; 40°31′21″N 112°09′07″W	Copperton	
17	Black Rock Site	Black Rock Site	March 24, 2021 (#100006332)	2.5 miles (4.0 km) west of jct. UT 202 and I 80; 40°43′30″N 112°13′40″W	Lake Point vicinity	Black Rock and the foundation ruins of Black Rock Resort. Extends into Tooele County.
18	Ernie and Irmgard Bourne House	Ernie and Irmgard Bourne House	June 28, 2016 (#16000418)	3460 E. Ranch View Dr. 40°40′45″N 111°47′48″W	Millcreek	
19	Rawsel and Jane Bradford House	Rawsel and Jane Bradford House	January 7, 2015 (#14001137)	570 E. 4800 South; 40°39′55″N 111°52′29″W	Murray	
20	Brady-Brady House	Brady-Brady House	December 30, 2004 (#04001419)	8395 S. 1000 East; 40°35′56″N 111°51′42″W	Sandy	
21	Brinton-Dahl House	Brinton-Dahl House	February 14, 1980 (#80003917)	1501 E. Spring Lane; 40°39′28″N 111°50′47″W	Holladay	
22	David B. Brinton House	David B. Brinton House	May 22, 1978 (#78002665)	1981 E. Murray–Holladay Road; 40°39′58″N 111°50′03″W	Holladay	
23	Harold W. and Evelyn Burton House	Harold W. and Evelyn Burton House	August 7, 2017 (#100001440)	2195 E. Walker Ln. 40°39′10″N 111°49′46″W	Holladay	
24	Butler School Teachers Dormitory		March 15, 2023 (#100008743)	2680 East Fort Union Blvd. 40°37′26″N 111°48′59″W	Cottonwood Heights	
25	Butler-Wallin House	Butler-Wallin House	June 10, 2005 (#05000593)	1045 E. 4500 South; 40°40′29″N 111°51′38″W	Millcreek	
26	John P. Cahoon House	John P. Cahoon House	March 3, 1983 (#83003186)	4872 S. Poplar St. 40°39′56″N 111°53′22″W	Murray	
27	Santa Anna Casto House	Santa Anna Casto House	February 3, 1983 (#83004422)	Approximately 4555 S. Holladay Blvd. 40°40′18″N 111°49′39″W	Holladay	Originally located at 2731 E. Casto Ln., moved in 2001 to 2210 E. Murray-Holladay Rd., moved again on Oct 20, 2012.
28	Morton A. Cheesman House		July 23, 1982 (#82004137)	2320 E. Walker Ln. 40°38′56″N 111°49′19″W	Holladay	
29	William Christopherson House	William Christopherson House	December 9, 1999 (#99001554)	8847 S. 360 East; 40°35′27″N 111°52′46″W	Sandy	
30	Copperton Community Methodist Church	Copperton Community Methodist Church	February 21, 2007 (#07000080)	410 E. Hillcrest St. 40°33′45″N 112°05′46″W	Copperton	
31	Copperton Historic District	Copperton Historic District	August 14, 1986 (#86002642)	Roughly bounded by State Route 48, 5 East, Hillcrest, and 2 West Sts. 40°33′56″N 112°05′55″W	Copperton	
32	Crescent Elementary School	Crescent Elementary School	November 22, 2000 (#00001303)	11020 S. State St. 40°33′05″N 111°53′27″W	Sandy	
33	Crossgrove House	Crossgrove House	January 27, 2012 (#11001068)	12736 S. Boulter St. 40°31′14″N 111°50′57″W	Draper	part of the Draper, Utah Multiple Property Submission
34	Arthur and Ellen Cushing House	Arthur and Ellen Cushing House	November 6, 2000 (#00001304)	123 E. Pioneer Ave. (8530 South); 40°35′48″N 111°53′09″W	Sandy	
35	Ernest and Sadie Cushing House	Ernest and Sadie Cushing House	August 8, 1996 (#96000887)	60 E. Pioneer Ave. (8530 South); 40°35′46″N 111°53′19″W	Sandy	
36	James and Maria Long Cushing House	James and Maria Long Cushing House	December 9, 1999 (#99001546)	68 E. Pioneer Ave. (8530 South); 40°35′46″N 111°53′18″W	Sandy	
37	Emma Olive Dobbs House	Emma Olive Dobbs House	August 8, 1996 (#96000889)	578 E. Locust St. 40°35′31″N 111°52′25″W	Sandy	
38	Hannah Nash Dowding House	Hannah Nash Dowding House	November 6, 2000 (#00001305)	8830 S. 60 East; 40°35′28″N 111°53′20″W	Sandy	A hall-parlor plan cottage
39	Dowding-Rasmussen House	Dowding-Rasmussen House	November 6, 2000 (#00001306)	98 E. Main St. (8720 South); 40°35′35″N 111°53′20″W	Sandy	
40	Draper Park School	Draper Park School	May 7, 1980 (#80003913)	12441 S. 900 East; 40°31′29″N 111°51′53″W	Draper	
41	Draper Poultrymen and Egg Producers' Plant	Draper Poultrymen and Egg Producers' Plant	May 6, 2004 (#04000403)	1071 E. Pioneer Rd. (12400 South); 40°31′33″N 111°51′42″W	Draper	
42	Draper-Steadman House	Draper-Steadman House	August 21, 1992 (#92001057)	13518 S. 1700 West; 40°30′19″N 111°56′18″W	Riverton	
43	Emigration Canyon	Emigration Canyon	October 15, 1966 (#66000737)	Eastern edge of Salt Lake City on former State Route 65; 40°45′03″N 111°49′04″W	Emigration Canyon	
44	Empress Theatre	Empress Theatre	May 9, 1985 (#85000962)	9104 W. 2700 South (Main Street); 40°42′40″N 112°06′27″W	Magna	
45	Enniss Auto Service Station		July 18, 2024 (#100010546)	11651 S. 700 East; 40°32′24″N 111°52′17″W	Draper	
46	Evergreen Avenue Historic District	Evergreen Avenue Historic District	February 14, 2007 (#07000081)	Roughly bounded by Evergreen Ave., 2300 East, 3300 South, and 2700 East; 40°41′55″N 111°49′10″W	Millcreek	
47	Benjamin and Jane Cook Farrer House	Benjamin and Jane Cook Farrer House	August 28, 1992 (#92001065)	530 E. 8800 South; 40°35′29″N 111°52′32″W	Sandy	
48	John William Farrer House	John William Farrer House	August 28, 1992 (#92001064)	39 E. Pioneer Ave. (8530 South); 40°35′47″N 111°53′19″W	Sandy	
49	Fish-Baughman House	Fish-Baughman House	June 28, 2016 (#16000420)	3436 E. Ranch View Dr. 40°40′45″N 111°47′50″W	Millcreek	
50	Fitzgerald House	Fitzgerald House	January 5, 2017 (#16000679)	12934 S. Fort St. 40°30′59″N 111°51′55″W	Draper	
51	Perry and Agnes Wadsworth Fitzgerald House and Cabin	Perry and Agnes Wadsworth Fitzgerald House and Cabin	May 6, 2004 (#04000404)	1160 E. Pioneer Rd. (12400 South); 40°31′30″N 111°51′22″W	Draper	A boundary decrease was approved July 10, 2023.
52	Gardner Mill	Gardner Mill	September 29, 1982 (#82004153)	1050 W. 7800 South; 40°36′33″N 111°55′21″W	West Jordan	
53	Archibald R. and Violet Clark Gardner House	Archibald R. and Violet Clark Gardner House	July 9, 1997 (#97000642)	31 E. Pioneer Ave. (8530 South); 40°35′48″N 111°53′16″W	Sandy	
54	Robert Gardner Jr. House	Robert Gardner Jr. House	January 18, 2018 (#100001441)	1475 E. Murphy's Ln. 40°41′35″N 111°50′57″W	Millcreek	Oldest standing structure in Utah? What does the interpretative display at site say?
55	Garside-McMullin House		December 17, 1982 (#82004852)	10481 S. 1300 West; 40°33′38″N 111°55′48″W	South Jordan	1898 Queen Anne style house
56	John and Jennette Gerrard House		October 17, 2022 (#100008273)	1488 West 4800 South; 40°39′51″N 111°56′00″W	Taylorsville	
57	Granite Hydroelectric Power Plant Historic District	Granite Hydroelectric Power Plant Historic District	April 20, 1989 (#89000283)	State Route 190 (previously State Route 152); 40°37′09″N 111°46′53″W	Cottonwood Heights	
58	Granite LDS Ward Chapel-Avard Fairbanks Studio	Granite LDS Ward Chapel-Avard Fairbanks Studio	December 30, 2005 (#05000364)	9800 S. 3100 East; 40°34′25″N 111°48′16″W	Sandy	
59	Granite Paper Mill	Granite Paper Mill	April 16, 1971 (#71000848)	6900 S. Big Cottonwood Canyon Rd. 40°37′37″N 111°47′57″W	Cottonwood Heights	
60	Riley H. and Sarah Ann Russell Graves House	Riley H. and Sarah Ann Russell Graves House	December 9, 1999 (#99001559)	8585 S. 100 East; 40°35′44″N 111°52′56″W	Sandy	
61	Alvin and Annie Green House	Alvin and Annie Green House	April 6, 2000 (#00000356)	8400 Danish Rd. 40°35′55″N 111°48′04″W	Cottonwood Heights	
62	Orlando H. and Emma H. Hardcastle House		December 9, 1999 (#99001560)	8751 S. 40 East; 40°35′33″N 111°53′22″W	Sandy	One-story cross-wing frame house, built c.1893
63	Hawarden	Hawarden	February 14, 1980 (#80003924)	4396 S. 3200 West; 40°40′30″N 111°58′05″W	West Valley City	
64	Anders Hintze House	Anders Hintze House	February 1, 1983 (#83004424)	4249 S. 2300 East; 40°40′48″N 111°49′25″W	Holladay	
65	Edward and Irene Hobbs House	Edward and Irene Hobbs House	July 23, 2018 (#100002702)	487 E Vine St. 40°39′36″N 111°52′40″W	Murray	
66	Abba R. Holman Block	Abba R. Holman Block	August 28, 1992 (#92001063)	142 E. Main St. (8720 South); 40°35′34″N 111°53′06″W	Sandy	
67	Samuel and Geneva Holt Farmstead		September 7, 2001 (#01000963)	10317 S. 1300 West; 40°33′50″N 111°55′34″W	South Jordan	
68	Alfred and Hennie Huetter House	Alfred and Hennie Huetter House	September 30, 2019 (#100004477)	187 E. 5600 South; 40°38′57″N 111°53′10″W	Murray	
69	Iceberg Drive-Inn	Iceberg Drive-Inn	July 16, 2026 (#100013211)	3906 S. 900 East; 40°41′13″N 111°52′25″W	Millcreek	
70	Iris Theater, Apartments and Commercial Building	Iris Theater, Apartments and Commercial Building	September 7, 2001 (#01000959)	4861 S. State St. 40°39′58″N 111°53′13″W	Murray	
71	Hyrum and Selma Erickson Jacobson House	Hyrum and Selma Erickson Jacobson House	December 9, 1999 (#99001550)	8908 S. 220 East; 40°35′24″N 111°53′00″W	Sandy	
72	Amos and Ida Jensen House	Amos and Ida Jensen House	November 6, 2000 (#00001307)	387 E. 8800 South; 40°35′31″N 111°52′43″W	Sandy	
73	James B. and Ellen May Cushing Jensen House	James B. and Ellen May Cushing Jensen House	July 9, 1997 (#97000635)	95 E. Pioneer Ave. (8530 South); 40°35′48″N 111°53′10″W	Sandy	
74	Joseph F. and Isabelle Jensen House	Joseph F. and Isabelle Jensen House	June 11, 1998 (#98000640)	428 E. 8800 South; 40°35′31″N 111°52′44″W	Sandy	
75	Michael Jensen House	Michael Jensen House	December 9, 1999 (#99001557)	565 E. 8800 South; 40°35′30″N 111°52′32″W	Sandy	
76	Jensen-Clark House		November 6, 2000 (#00001298)	32 E. Main St. (8720 South); 40°35′35″N 111°53′22″W	Sandy	
77	Jensen-Jensen House	Jensen-Jensen House	November 6, 2000 (#00001299)	55 E. Pioneer Ave. (8530 South); 40°35′48″N 111°53′19″W	Sandy	
78	David and Hattie S. Rasmuson Johnson House	David and Hattie S. Rasmuson Johnson House	December 9, 1999 (#99001553)	8649 S. 90 East; 40°35′39″N 111°53′11″W	Sandy	
79	John A. and Annie C. Olsen Johnson House	John A. and Annie C. Olsen Johnson House	December 9, 1999 (#99001547)	21 E. Pioneer Ave. (8530 South); 40°35′48″N 111°53′20″W	Sandy	
80	Jordan School District Administration Building		April 1, 1985 (#85000810)	9361 S. 400 East; 40°34′54″N 111°52′49″W	Sandy	PWA Moderne-style building, built in 1935 as a Public Works Administration project. May have been demolished.
81	Kearns-St. Ann's Orphanage	Kearns-St. Ann's Orphanage	October 3, 1980 (#80003925)	430 E. 2100 South; 40°43′30″N 111°52′41″W	South Salt Lake	
82	William D. Kuhre House		July 6, 1987 (#87001175)	8586 S. 150 East; 40°35′44″N 111°53′07″W	Sandy	
83	Little Cottonwood Canyon Climbing Area		August 5, 2024 (#100010670)	4385 Little Cottonwood Canyon Road; 40°34′21″N 111°46′29″W	Sandy	
84	Little Dell Station	Little Dell Station	August 12, 1971 (#71000850)	East of Salt Lake City in Mountain Dell Canyon, near the junction of State Route 65 and the road to Emigration Canyon (see Utah State Route 239 (1947-1969)); 40°46′40″N 111°41′09″W	Wasatch-Cache National Forest	
85	William and Annie Livingston House	William and Annie Livingston House	October 16, 2002 (#02001182)	2491 E. Valley View Ave. 40°39′51″N 111°49′07″W	Holladay	
86	Albert and Celestine Mabey House	Albert and Celestine Mabey House	August 27, 2013 (#13000641)	10201 S. 1300 West; 40°33′58″N 111°55′43″W	South Jordan	Part of the South Jordan, Utah MPS
87	Magna Commercial Downtown Historic District		January 4, 2021 (#100006004)	Along West Main St. 40°42′40″N 112°05′43″W	Magna	
88	Magna Community Baptist Church	Magna Community Baptist Church	June 5, 1986 (#86001233)	2916 S. 8900 West; 40°42′26″N 112°06′13″W	Magna	
89	Anne P. Marriott House	Anne P. Marriott House	November 6, 2000 (#00001300)	8543 S. 100 East; 40°35′46″N 111°53′14″W	Sandy	
90	John and Mary Mattson House	John and Mary Mattson House	August 8, 1996 (#96000886)	239 E. Main St. (8720 South); 40°35′36″N 111°52′56″W	Sandy	
91	David McDonald House	David McDonald House	May 29, 1980 (#80003927)	4659 S. Highland Dr. 40°40′10″N 111°50′20″W	Holladay	
92	William McLachlan Farmhouse		February 14, 1980 (#80003928)	4499 S. 3200 West; 40°40′23″N 111°57′58″W	West Valley City	
93	Benjamin and Olivia Meek House	Benjamin and Olivia Meek House	November 29, 2001 (#01001282)	12782 S. Fort St. 40°31′09″N 111°51′52″W	Draper	
94	Joseph E. and Mina W. Mickelsen House	Joseph E. and Mina W. Mickelsen House	May 6, 2004 (#04000405)	782 E. Pioneer Rd. (12400 South); 40°31′30″N 111°52′09″W	Draper	
95	S.J. Mickelsen Hardware Store and Lumber Yard	S.J. Mickelsen Hardware Store and Lumber Yard	May 6, 2004 (#04000406)	12580-12582 S. Fort St. 40°31′22″N 111°51′51″W	Draper	
96	Hyrum and Mary A. Terry Peterson Mickelson House	Hyrum and Mary A. Terry Peterson Mickelson House	December 9, 1999 (#99001551)	8850 S. 120 East; 40°35′26″N 111°53′09″W	Sandy	
97	Midvale City Hall	Midvale City Hall	April 7, 1994 (#94000293)	695 W. Center St. 40°36′37″N 111°54′33″W	Midvale	Now the Midvale Community Building, used as an auditorium
98	Mountair Acres Subdivision Historic District	Mountair Acres Subdivision Historic District	April 1, 2025 (#100011597)	Roughly bounded by Imperial Street on the north, 3150 South on the east, Highland Drive on the south, and 3010 South on the west 40°42′14″N 111°50′53″W	Millcreeek	
99	Mountain Dell Dam	Mountain Dell Dam	June 20, 1980 (#80003930)	East of Salt Lake City on Interstate 80; 40°45′06″N 111°43′12″W	Wasatch-Cache National Forest	A multiple arch with buttress dam of reinforced concrete in Parley's Canyon constructed between 1914 and 1925
100	Mountair Canyon Historic District		August 2, 2023 (#100009201)	East Mt. Aire Rd., South Mt. Aire Rd., and Maple Fork Way; 40°43′41″N 111°43′02″W	Millcreek vicinity	
101	James A. and Janet Muir House		October 22, 2018 (#100003042)	2940 E Mount Jordan Rd. 40°34′16″N 111°48′30″W	Sandy	
102	Murray Baptist Church	Murray Baptist Church	April 6, 2026 (#100012887)	4886 S. Poplar Street; 40°39′55″N 111°53′23″W	Murray	
103	Murray City Diesel Power Plant	Murray City Diesel Power Plant	January 7, 2015 (#14001139)	157 W. 4800 South; 40°40′03″N 111°53′43″W	Murray	
104	Murray Downtown Historic District	Murray Downtown Historic District	September 26, 2006 (#06000928)	Roughly bounded by 4800 South, Poplar St., Vine St., and Center St. 40°40′04″N 111°53′18″W	Murray	
105	Murray Downtown Residential Historic District	Murray Downtown Residential Historic District	January 26, 2005 (#04001566)	Roughly bounded by 4800 South, Clark St., Vine St., and Center St.; also roughly bounded by 4600 South, Meadowview Rd., 4800 South, Brown St. 40°39′53″N 111°52′59″W	Murray	Second set of boundaries represent a boundary increase approved November 5, 2020
106	Murray Hillside Historic District	Murray Hillside Historic District	October 15, 2014 (#14000863)	Roughly bounded by 5300 South, Kenwood Dr., 5600 South & 235 East; 40°39′10″N 111°52′54″W	Murray	
107	Murray LDS Second Ward Meetinghouse	Murray LDS Second Ward Meetinghouse	May 8, 2001 (#01000475)	5056 S. Commerce Dr. (300 West); 40°39′43″N 111°53′55″W	Murray	
108	Murray Theater	Murray Theater	May 8, 2001 (#01000476)	4961 S. State St. 40°39′50″N 111°53′17″W	Murray	
109	August M. and Mabel Jensen Nelson House	August M. and Mabel Jensen Nelson House	July 9, 1997 (#97000643)	427 E. 8800 South; 40°35′31″N 111°52′39″W	Sandy	
110	Nels A. Nelson House		August 28, 1992 (#92001062)	8840 S. 90 East; 40°35′26″N 111°53′10″W	Sandy	
111	Nielsen-Sanderson House	Nielsen-Sanderson House	October 22, 2018 (#100003043)	12758 S Fort St. 40°31′11″N 111°51′53″W	Draper	
112	Oakwood	Oakwood	November 16, 1979 (#79002503)	2610 E. Evergreen Ave. 40°41′47″N 111°48′57″W	Millcreek	
113	John and Elizabeth Brown Oldham House	John and Elizabeth Brown Oldham House	July 9, 1997 (#97000636)	511 E. 8800 South; 40°35′31″N 111°52′32″W	Sandy	
114	Orton-Malstrom House	Orton-Malstrom House	July 9, 1997 (#97000640)	9325 S. 700 East; 40°34′55″N 111°52′15″W	Sandy	
115	John Thomas and Myrtle Bodell Ostler House		December 9, 1999 (#99001552)	589 E. 8800 South; 40°35′31″N 111°52′31″W	Sandy	
116	Parade of Homes Lakewood Site Historic District	Parade of Homes Lakewood Site Historic District	April 11, 2022 (#100007561)	East Lone Peak and South Fairoaks Drs. 40°39′06″N 111°50′39″W	Holladay	
117	Mary Ellen Parmley House	Mary Ellen Parmley House	November 6, 2000 (#00001301)	8850 S. 220 East; 40°35′29″N 111°53′40″W	Sandy	
118	Charles Peterson House	Charles Peterson House	August 28, 1992 (#92001061)	82 E. 8880 South; 40°35′30″N 111°53′13″W	Sandy	
119	Peter and Ingrid C. Larson Pierson House		December 9, 1999 (#99001548)	31 E. 8680 South; 40°35′38″N 111°53′19″W	Sandy	
120	Edward Pugh House	Edward Pugh House	August 31, 1978 (#78002680)	1299 E. 4500 South; 40°40′28″N 111°51′13″W	Millcreek	
121	Riverton Elementary School	Riverton Elementary School	August 8, 1996 (#96000872)	12830 S. Redwood Rd. 40°31′06″N 111°56′22″W	Riverton	Now houses the Riverton City Office
122	Riverton Historic District		January 21, 2004 (#03001484)	Roughly 12300 S. Redwood Rd. to 12600 S. Redwood Rd. 40°31′39″N 111°56′17″W	Riverton	
123	Ross Hame		July 23, 2018 (#100002703)	4769 S Holladay Blvd. 40°39′58″N 111°49′18″W	Holladay	
124	Matthew and Johanna Rowan House	Matthew and Johanna Rowan House	September 30, 2019 (#100004478)	198 W. Winchester St. 40°37′58″N 111°53′48″W	Murray	
125	Salt Lake County Library	Salt Lake County Library	July 26, 1982 (#82004129)	665 W. Center St. 40°36′37″N 111°54′28″W	Midvale	Now the Midvale city hall. Demolished.
126	Sandy City Bank	Sandy City Bank	July 9, 1997 (#97000637)	212 E. Main St. (8720 South); 40°35′33″N 111°52′55″W	Sandy	
127	Sandy Co-Op Block	Sandy Co-Op Block	August 28, 1992 (#92001060)	8744 S. Center St. (150 East); 40°35′33″N 111°53′05″W	Sandy	
128	Sandy Historic District	Sandy Historic District	April 20, 2007 (#07000084)	Roughly bounded by State St., 9000 South, 700 East, and Pioneer Ave. (8530 South); 40°35′34″N 111°52′51″W	Sandy	
129	Sandy LDS Stake Recreational Hall	Sandy LDS Stake Recreational Hall	November 6, 2000 (#00001316)	295 E. 8800 South; 40°35′32″N 111°52′51″W	Sandy	
130	Sandy Second Ward Chapel	Sandy Second Ward Chapel	July 9, 1997 (#97000638)	8630 S. 60 East; 40°35′41″N 111°53′20″W	Sandy	
131	Sandy Tithing Office	Sandy Tithing Office	January 25, 1985 (#85000279)	8845 S. 280 East; 40°35′27″N 111°52′53″W	Sandy	
132	Joseph M. and Celestia Smith House	Joseph M. and Celestia Smith House	April 7, 1994 (#94000291)	12373 S. Relation St. (1565 East); 40°31′31″N 111°50′46″W	Draper	
133	Lauritz H. and Emma Smith House	Lauritz H. and Emma Smith House	February 1, 2006 (#05001633)	12423 S. Relation St. 40°31′32″N 111°50′48″W	Draper	
134	Lauritz Smith House	Lauritz Smith House	June 24, 1983 (#83003179)	1350 E. Pioneer Rd. (12400 South); 40°31′29″N 111°51′02″W	Draper	
135	Mary Smith House	Mary Smith House	April 15, 1994 (#94000292)	12544 S. Relation St. (1565 East); 40°31′24″N 111°50′49″W	Draper	
136	Ray F. and Ethel Smith House	Ray F. and Ethel Smith House	September 30, 2019 (#100004479)	1697 E. Vine St. 40°38′29″N 111°50′34″W	Murray	
137	Spencer Homestead Site		October 17, 2022 (#100008270)	2591 East Dimple Dell Rd. 40°33′22″N 111°49′03″W	Sandy	
138	Stairs Station Hydroelectric Power Plant Historic District	Stairs Station Hydroelectric Power Plant Historic District	April 20, 1989 (#89000284)	State Route 190 (former State Route 152); 40°37′31″N 111°44′39″W	Big Cottonwood Canyon	
139	Roberta Sugden House	Roberta Sugden House	March 22, 2016 (#16000124)	1810 E. Orchard Dr. 40°41′25″N 111°50′24″W	Millcreek	
140	Thomas & Margaret Taylor House		September 9, 2020 (#100005545)	604 East Taylor Ln. 40°39′07″N 111°52′27″W	Murray	
141	Taylorsville LDS Ward Meetinghouse		March 24, 2022 (#100007527)	1247 West 4800 South; 40°39′50″N 111°55′39″W	Taylorsville	
142	Niels and Mary Ann Fitzgerald Thompson House	Niels and Mary Ann Fitzgerald Thompson House	July 9, 1997 (#97000639)	485 E. 8800 South; 40°35′31″N 111°52′36″W	Sandy	
143	Utah Copper Company Mine Superintendent's House		October 31, 1985 (#85003422)	104 E. State Highway; 40°33′56″N 112°05′53″W	Copperton	
144	Utah State Penitentiary Chapel by the Wayside		February 23, 2026 (#100012713)	Off Bitterbrush Lane; 40°29′21″N 111°54′03″W	Draper vicinity	
145	Louis E. and Florence Jensen Van Dam House	Louis E. and Florence Jensen Van Dam House	December 9, 1999 (#99001555)	407 E. 8800 South; 40°35′31″N 111°52′43″W	Sandy	
146	William Tyler and Amorilla Gammet Vincent House	William Tyler and Amorilla Gammet Vincent House	July 9, 1997 (#97000644)	92 E. Pioneer Ave. (8530 South); 40°35′45″N 111°53′11″W	Sandy	
147	Glen M. and Roxie Walbeck House	Glen M. and Roxie Walbeck House	February 1, 2006 (#05001630)	12875 S. Boulter St. 40°31′04″N 111°50′55″W	Draper	
148	George and Lida Walker House		March 11, 2024 (#100010060)	2480 E Walker Ln; 40°39′06″N 111°49′13″W	Holladay	
149	Wesley and Frances Walton House		August 4, 1995 (#95000983)	5197 S. Wesley Rd. 40°39′24″N 111°51′26″W	Murray	
150	Warenski-Duvall Commercial Building and Apartments	Warenski-Duvall Commercial Building and Apartments	May 19, 2000 (#00000521)	4867 S. State St. 40°39′57″N 111°53′12″W	Murray	
151	Wasatch Mountain Club Lodge		November 10, 1980 (#80003935)	Southeast of Salt Lake City; 40°35′46″N 111°35′05″W	Brighton	Log cabin built 1929-30
152	West Jordan Ward Meetinghouse	West Jordan Ward Meetinghouse	April 14, 1995 (#95000415)	1140 W. 7800 South; 40°36′28″N 111°55′27″W	West Jordan	
153	Westwood Village Historic District		March 29, 2024 (#100009202)	Roughly bounded by 2700 West (Constitution Blvd.), the rear property line of the east side of 2475 West, 3800 South, and the rear property line of the south side of 3935 South; 40°41′14″N 111°57′17″W	West Valley City	
154	Henry J. Wheeler Farm	Henry J. Wheeler Farm	May 4, 1976 (#76001832)	6343 S. 900 East; 40°38′03″N 111°51′42″W	Murray	
155	William W. and Christene Wilson House		December 30, 2004 (#04001421)	113 E. 8680 South; 40°35′45″N 111°53′16″W	Sandy	

== Former listings ==
	Name on the Register	Image	Date listed	Date removed	Location	City or town	Description
1	Bonnyview Elementary School		May 8, 2001 (#01000473)	February 21, 2007	4984 S. 300 West	Murray	
2	George Henry Dansie Farmstead		September 27, 1979 (#79002498)	February 21, 2007	12494 S. 1700 West	Riverton	
3	Erickson Artillo Dairy Farmhouse		September 29, 2015 (#15000677)	March 26, 2018	5419 S. 900 E. 40°39′14″N 111°51′53″W	Murray	
4	Jordan High School	Jordan High School	May 17, 1984 (#84002203)	May 15, 2001	9351 S. State St.	Sandy	Demolished in 1997.
5	Utah-Idaho Sugar Factory		February 13, 2009 (#09000018)	June 15, 2015	2140 W. Sugar Factory Rd. 40°36′07″N 111°56′45″W	West Jordan	Demolished in January 2011
6	Webster School		December 28, 2000 (#00001585)	April 28, 2005	2700 S. 9180 West	Magna	Destroyed by fire on June 22, 2004.

== See also ==
- List of National Historic Landmarks in Utah
- National Register of Historic Places listings in Utah
