= Brady House =

Brady House may refer to:

== People ==
- Brady House (baseball) (born 2003), American baseball player

== Structures ==
- The Brady house, fictional home of the TV series The Brady Bunch, and subject of the TV series A Very Brady Renovation
- Brady Cabin, Ardmore, Oklahoma, listed on the National Register of Historic Places (NRHP)
- Brady-Brady House, Sandy, Utah, NRHP-listed
- Halloran-Matthews-Brady House, Spearfish, South Dakota, NRHP-listed

== See also ==
- Brady Building-Empire Theater, San Antonio, Texas, NRHP-listed
- McCord-Brady Company, Cheyenne, Wyoming, NRHP-listed
- Brady Heights Historic District, Tulsa, Oklahoma, NRHP-listed
- Brady Historic District, Tulsa, Oklahoma, NRHP-listed
- Brady Memorial Chapel, Pocatello, Idaho, NRHP-listed
- Brady Street Historic District, Attica, Indiana, NRHP-listed
- Brady (disambiguation)
