= Fitzgerald House =

Fitzgerald House may refer to:

- Fitzgerald Station and Farmstead, Springdale, Arkansas, listed on the National Register of Historic Places (NRHP)
- Fitzgerald House (Minden, Louisiana), listed on the NRHP in Webster Parish, Louisiana
- F. Scott Fitzgerald House, St. Paul, Minnesota, NRHP-listed
- Paul Fitzgerald House, Louisville, Nebraska, listed on the NRHP in Cass County, Nebraska
- Perry and Agnes Wadsworth Fitzgerald House, Draper, Utah, NRHP-listed
- Thomas Fitzgerald House, Port Townsend, Washington, listed on the NRHP in Jefferson County, Washington
- Rural Home, the plantation of Philip Fitzgerald (great-grandfather of Margaret Mitchell) in Clayton County, Georgia.
