= Empress Theatre (Magna, Utah) =

- U.S. National Register of Historic Places
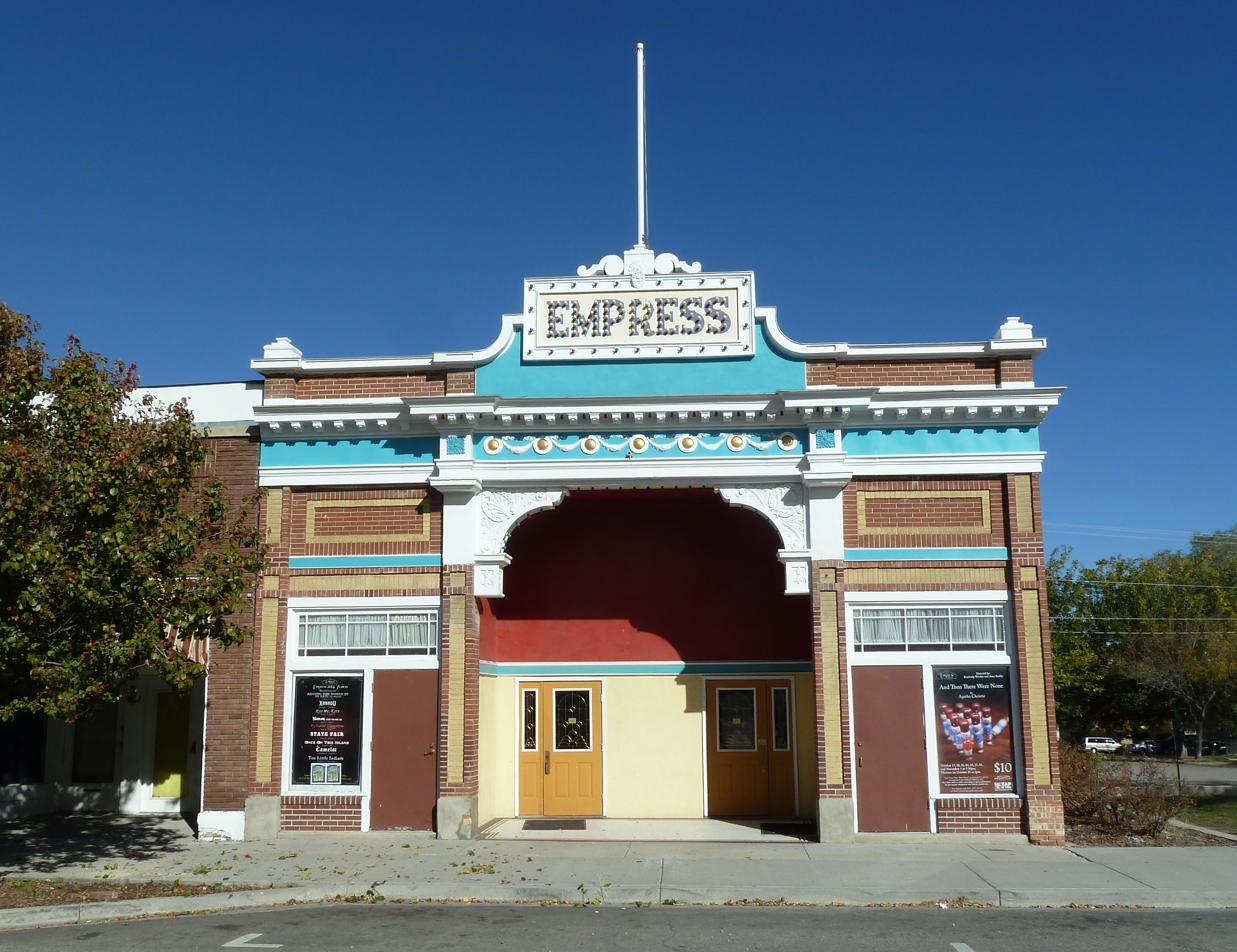
- Front facade

- Location within Utah Location within the United States
- Location: 9104 W 2700 S, Magna, Utah
- Coordinates: 40°42′40″N 112°06′30″W
- Built: 1916
- Architectural style: classical revival, Beaux Arts
- NRHP reference No.: 85000962
- Added to NRHP: 1985

The Empress Theatre is a theater on historic Main Street in the U.S. town of Magna, Utah that has stood for more than 100 years. Built in 1916 by the Western Theatre Corporation, the venue originally opened to provide entertainment to the mine workers of the town.

== Historical significance ==
The design of the building, a combination of Neo-classical and Beaux Arts styles, makes it the most outstanding example of high style architecture in Magna. Though not a premier example of the Neo-classical style in Utah, the Empress Theatre is one of several distinctively styled theaters in small Utah towns that are dominated by relatively plain commercial buildings.

Historically, the Empress Theatre is one of the oldest and best-preserved commercial buildings in Magna, and it is the oldest theater in the community. At the time of its construction, the Empress Theatre was the second theater in Magna. The first, the Palace Theatre, operated from 1914 to 1917, but its location is currently unknown. The Empress Theatre was constructed during the period of greatest growth in Magna, the 1910s and 1920s. The Utah Copper Corporation was established in 1903, incorporating numerous small mining operations into one large one, and soon after erected the Magna and Arthur concentrators near the site of Pleasant Green, which several years later became known as Magna.

The Empress Theatre was one of several buildings that were erected along Main Street during the decades of the 1910s and '20s, creating a substantial commercial district. Most of those buildings have been left vacant and neglected over the past 50 years, however, as the prime commercial district has shifted further west and south and the depressed local economy has dried up most businesses in the old Main Street area. The Empress Theatre is one of the best preserved of the older commercial buildings along Main Street, and it is easily the most sophisticated in terms of its architectural design. Most of the remaining buildings in the area are relatively plain, nondescript commercial buildings.

On May 9, 1985, the theater was entered into the National Register of Historic Places (National Register #85000962), the only building in Magna to hold the distinction.

== Theater operations ==
Day-to-day operations are fulfilled by a group of more than 300 volunteers from around the Salt Lake Valley. In addition to these volunteers, the theater houses a resident creative staff. This staff is responsible for conceiving, developing, and implementing the artistic vision and focus of the theater and for major decisions about the ongoing development of the aesthetic values and activities. These include setting the season, managing the calendar, hiring directors and production staff as well as overseeing each production to make sure they are adhering to the theater's mission and goals.

The operation costs are covered entirely by grants and donations from patrons, making every production a true instance of community theater. In addition to the 8–10 shows put on every year, the theater houses a youth program for anyone aged 6 to 18 during the summer. This program puts on a fully produced and realized musical with only three weeks of preparation.

The theater, along with other buildings in Downtown Magna, sustained visible damage during a magnitude 5.7 earthquake on the morning of March 18, 2020.

== Oquirrh Hills Performing Arts Alliance ==
Starting in 2006, the Oquirrh Hills Performing Arts Alliance (OHPAA) – succeeded in once again making the Empress Theatre a working theater. Since that time, the volunteers, actors, and, board members of the OHPAA have worked tirelessly to improve both the organization and the building in order to continue to bring quality family entertainment to this corner of the Salt Lake Valley.

== See also ==
- National Register of Historic Places listings in Salt Lake County, Utah
