= Copperton Historic District =

- U.S. National Register of Historic Places
- Location within Utah Location within the United States
- Location: Roughly bounded by State Highway, Apex Road, Hillcrest Street, and Dinkyville Way in Copperton, Utah; United States
- Coordinates: 40°33′56″N 112°05′55″W
- Area: 78 acres (32 ha)
- Built: 1926-41
- Built by: Scott & Welch; et al.
- Architectural style: Bungalow/craftsman, Tudor Revival, Spanish Colonial Revival
- NRHP reference No.: 86002642
- Added to NRHP: August 14, 1986

The Copperton Historic District is a historic district in Copperton, Utah, United States, that is listed on the National Register of Historic Places (NRHP).

== Description ==
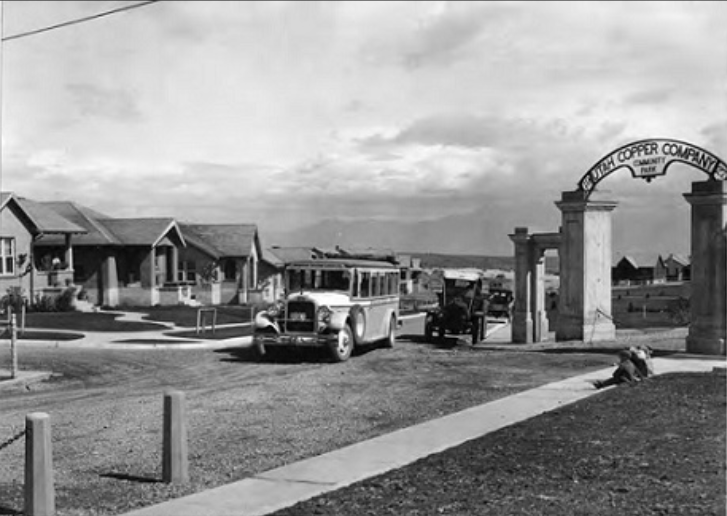
Historic image of Copperton, unknown date

The district includes 237 contributing buildings and two contributing structures, on 78 acres (32 ha). It is roughly bounded by State Highway (Utah State Route 209, formerly Utah State Route 48), Apex Road (formerly 5th East), Hillcrest Street, and Dinkyville Way (formerly 2nd West).

The district includes most of the historic town of Copperton, which was an isolated community at the mouth of Bingham Canyon, built mostly during 1926 to 1941 to house employees of the Utah Copper Company. The Copperton Community Methodist Church, which is also listed on the NRHP, is located just south of (outside) the boundaries of the historic district.

It includes Bungalow/craftsman, Tudor Revival, Spanish Colonial Revival, and vernacular architecture.

The district was listed on the NRHP on August 14, 1986

== See also ==
- National Register of Historic Places listings in Salt Lake County, Utah
