= Fitzgerald House (Draper, Utah) =

Historic place in Utah, United States

- U.S. National Register of Historic Places
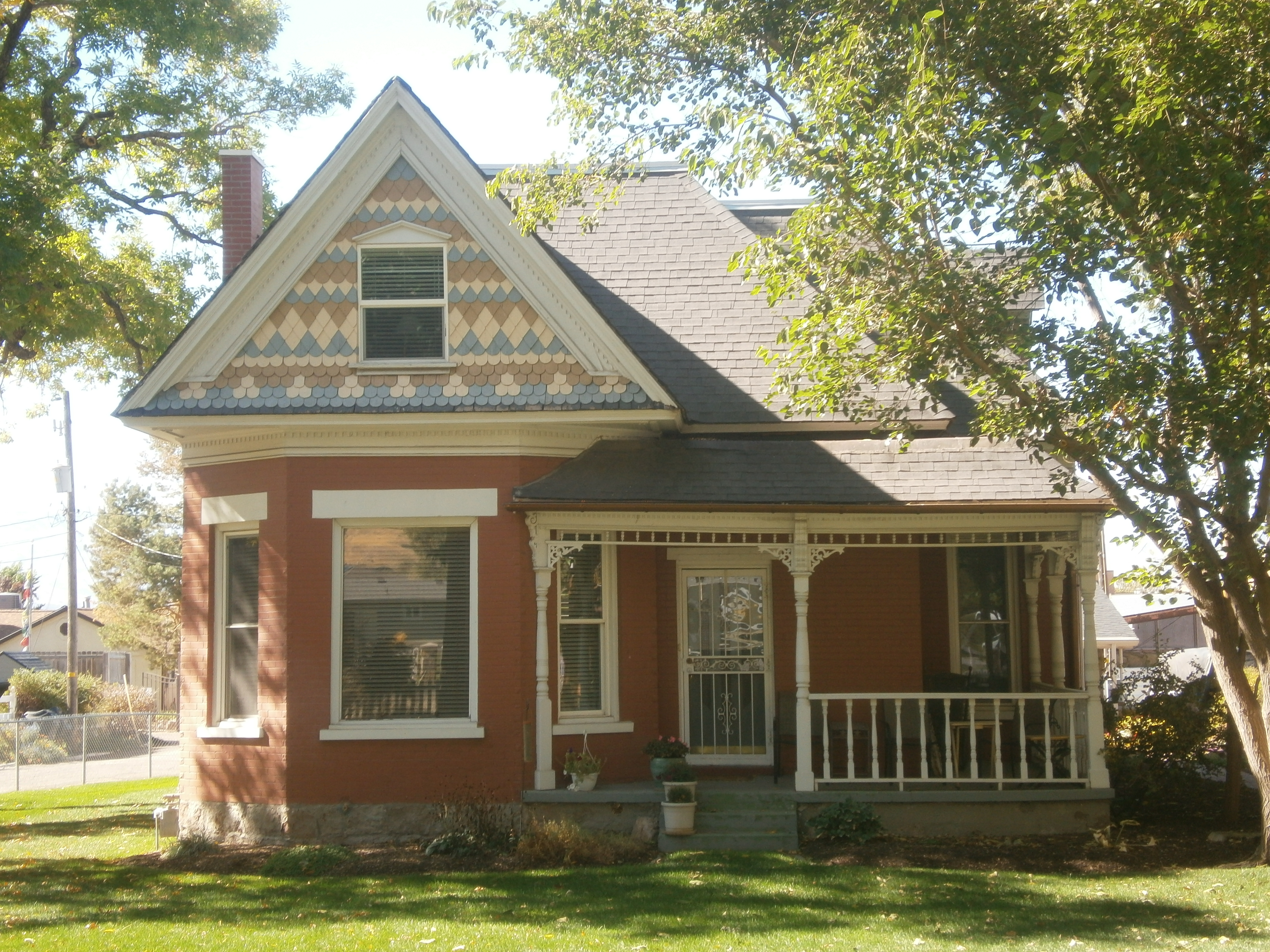

- Location within Utah Location within the United States
- Location: 12934 S. Fort St., Draper, Utah
- Coordinates: 40°30′59″N 111°51′55″W
- Area: .80 acres (0.32 ha)
- Built: 1898
- Architectural style: Victorian Eclectic
- MPS: Draper, Utah MPS
- NRHP reference No.: 16000679
- Added to NRHP: January 5, 2017

The Fitzgerald House in Draper, Utah, at 12934 S. Fort St., was built in 1898. It was listed on the National Register of Historic Places in 2016 or 2017.

It is a one-story brick Victorian Eclectic brick house. It was deemed significant "for its association with the rise of sheep ranching families in Draper at the turn of the twentieth century. The period of significance spans the productive lives of sheep ranchers, Aurelius W. and Nellie Brown Fitzgerald, and their son, Aurelius B. Fitzgerald, from 1898 to 1960. The prosperity of Draper ranchers during this period is represented by four Victorian-era mansions along Fort Street. Built around the same time as the mansions, the Fitzgerald House is more modest in scale, but features Victorian Eclectic ornamentation similar to its larger neighbors. Both Aurelius W. and Aurelius B. married late in life and the home represents the unpretentious aspirations of Draper's bachelor ranchers and farmers. Aurelius W. Fitzgerald maintained a large herd during the height of the sheep and wool industry in Draper. His son, Aurelius B. Fitzgerald, who operated a small dairy farm, was part of a transition in the community from large livestock holdings to specialized agriculture and cottage industries after the Great Depression."

Its listing is consistent with standards for historic properties in Draper established in a 2003 study.

It has a central-block-with-projecting-bays plan and sits on a granite foundation. A brick addition on a concrete foundation was added in 1912 to its rear, northwest corner. A screened porch was added c.1920. Its interior was remodeled during 1951–1952. Another remodeling in 1994-1995 added vinyl sheathing to the porch, and also restored many Victorian features. Its National Register nomination noted that "Despite two major renovations, the house retains its basic form and Victorian Eclectic ornamentation, such as lathe-turned porch posts, spindles, brackets and variegated shingles."

There are two other historic Fitzgerald residences surviving in Draper. The Perry Fitzgerald Cabin, built c.1850, "became a barn after the family built a brick home in the 1860s. The three-room cabin is currently located in the Draper City Park. It was moved from its original site and reassembled in the park around 1990." And the Perry and Agnes Wadsworth Fitzgerald House, at 1144 E. Pioneer Road, is also in Draper and listed on the National Register.
