= Granite LDS Ward Chapel-Avard Fairbanks Studio =

- Granite LDS Ward Chapel--Avard Fairbanks Studio
- U.S. National Register of Historic Places
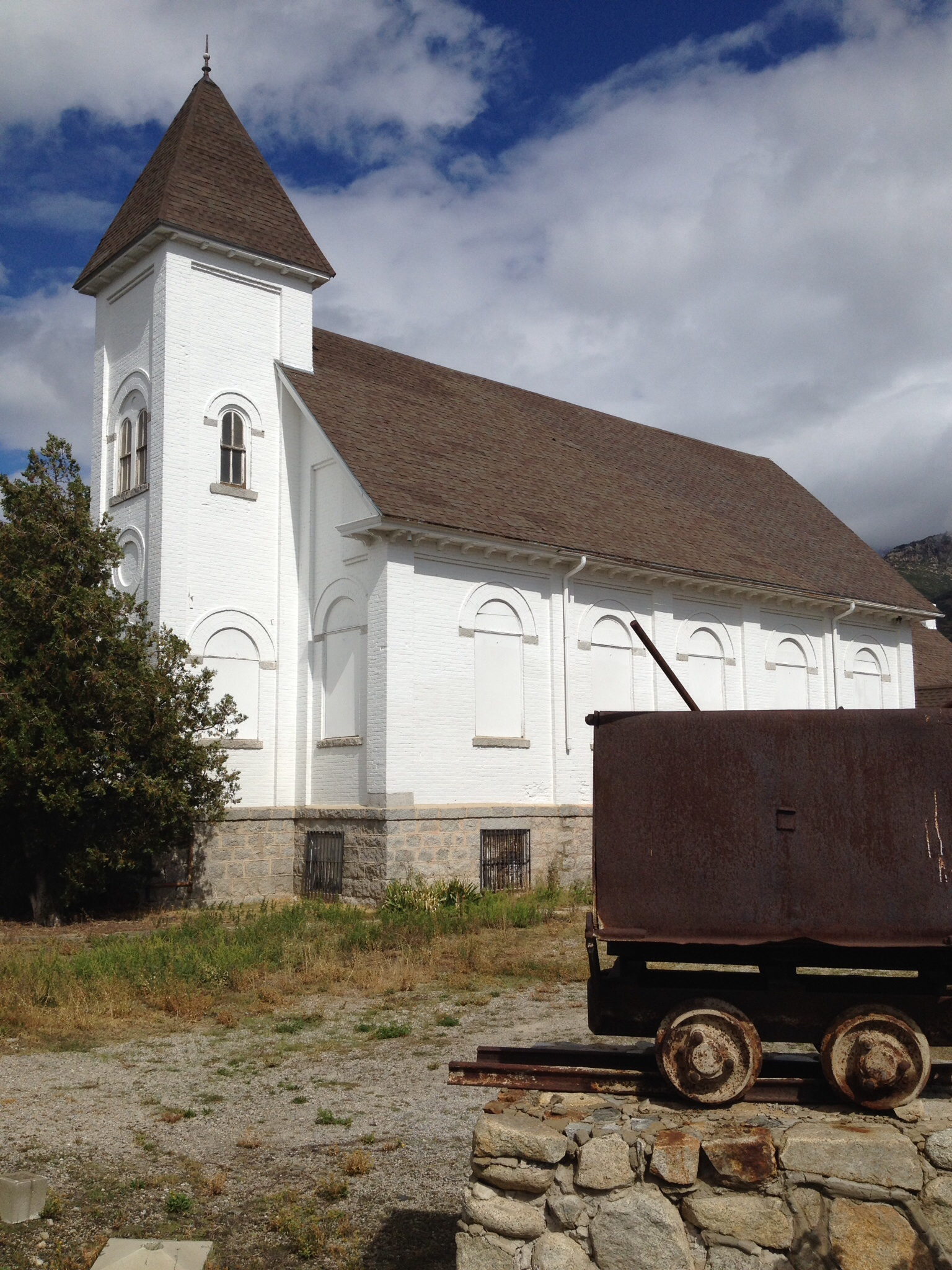
- The building in 2013

- Location within Utah Location within the United States
- Location: 9795 South 3100 East, Sandy, Utah
- Coordinates: 40°34′25″N 111°48′16″W
- Area: .99 acres (0.40 ha)
- Built: 1903
- Architectural style: Romanesque Revival
- MPS: Sandy City MPS
- NRHP reference No.: 05000364
- Added to NRHP: December 30, 2005

The Granite LDS Ward Chapel-Avard Fairbanks Studio is a historic building in Sandy, Utah. It was built in 1903-1905 as a meeting house for the Church of Jesus Christ of Latter-day Saints, and designed in the Romanesque Revival architectural style. It was acquired by sculptor Avard T. Fairbanks in 1966, and remodelled as his art studio. The building has been listed on the National Register of Historic Places since December 30, 2005.

As of at least May 22, 2025, the Granite LDS Ward Chapel-Avard Fairbanks Studio is owned by Grant Fairbanks.
