= John and Mary Mattson House =

Historic house in Sandy, Utah, United States

- U.S. National Register of Historic Places
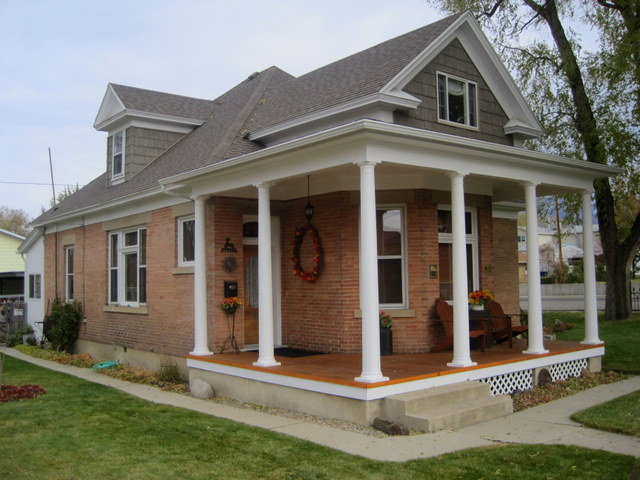
- John and Mary Mattson House, September 2018

- Location within Utah Location within the United States
- Location: 239 East Main Street; Sandy, Utah; United States
- Coordinates: 40°35′36″N 111°52′56″W
- Area: less than one acre
- Built: c. 1910
- Built by: Unknown
- Architectural style: Late Victorian
- MPS: Sandy City MPS
- NRHP reference No.: 96000886
- Added to NRHP: August 8, 1996

The John and Mary Mattson House is a historic house within the Sandy Historic District in Sandy, Utah, United States, that is individually listed on the National Register of Historic Places (NRHP).

== Description ==
The 1 1/2-story brick house was built in about 1910 and is located at 239 East Main Street. . According to its NRHP nomination, the house is significant for its association with the mining, smelting, and small farm period of 1871–1910 in Sandy. It is "among the best preserved examples" of a central-block-with-projecting-bays type of house that was fairly commonly built in Sandy, and its "Victorian Eclectic detailing is expressive of the level of craftsmanship attained locally."

It was listed on the National Register of Historic Places on August 8, 1996.

== See also ==
- National Register of Historic Places listings in Salt Lake County, Utah
