= Hannah Nash Dowding House =

- U.S. National Register of Historic Places
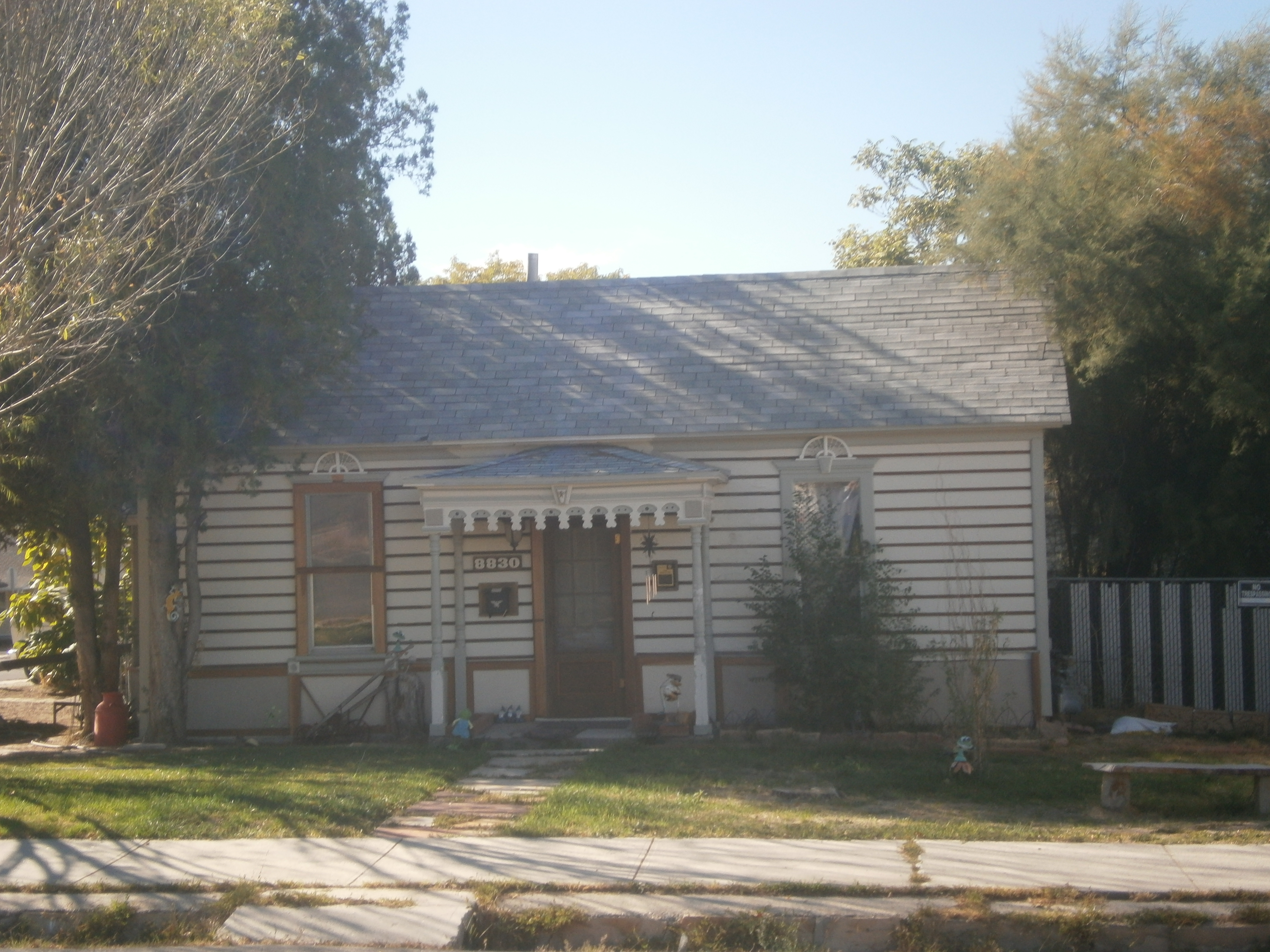

- Location within Utah Location within the United States
- Location: 8830 S 60 E, Sandy, Utah
- Coordinates: 40.591166°N 111.889012°W
- Area: 0.3 acres (0.12 ha)
- Built: c.1898
- Architectural style: Hall Parlor
- MPS: Sandy City MPS
- NRHP reference No.: 00001305
- Added to NRHP: November 6, 2000

The Hannah Nash Dowding House, at 8830 S 60 E in Sandy, Utah, was built around 1898. It was listed on the National Register of Historic Places in 2000.

It is a one-story, wood-frame hall-parlor plan cottage.

It was deemed "a typical example of a residence for the earliest working class citizens of Sandy."

It is also located at 280 South 300 West.
