= McCord-Brady Company =

- U.S. National Register of Historic Places
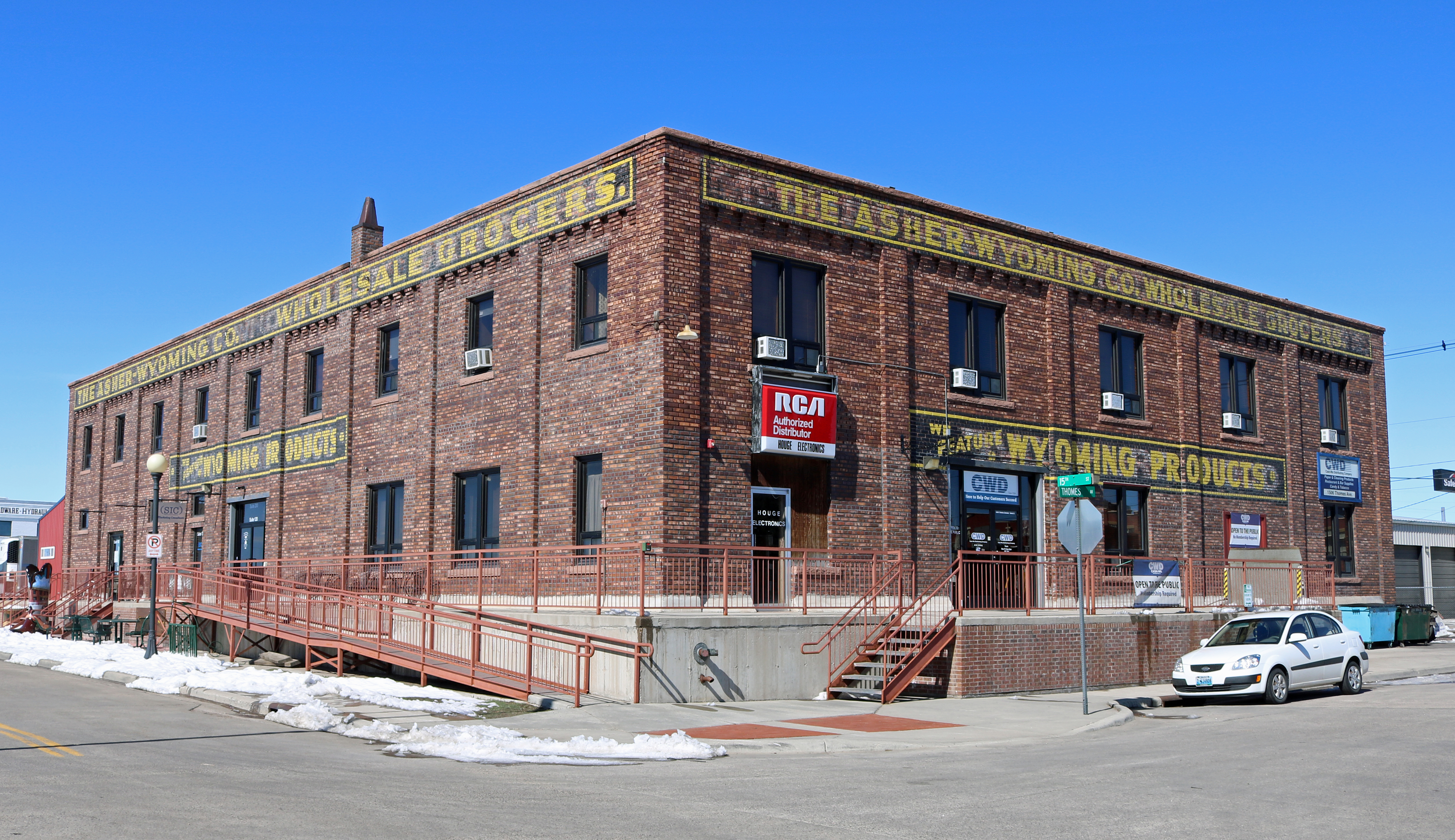

- Location within Wyoming
- Location: 1506 Thomes Ave., Cheyenne, Wyoming
- Coordinates: 41°07′51″N 104°49′05″W
- Area: 0.4 acres (0.16 ha)
- Built: 1914-15, 1966, 1989
- Architectural style: 20th Cent. Factory/Warehouse
- MPS: Industrial Facilities Served by Railroad in Cheyenne, Wyoming MPS
- NRHP reference No.: 03001028
- Added to NRHP: October 13, 2003

The McCord-Brady Company, at 1506 Thomes Ave. in Cheyenne, Wyoming, was built in 1914–15. It was listed on the National Register of Historic Places in 2003. It has also been known as Asher-Wyoming Company Wholesale Grocers and as Cheyenne Winlectric Company.

It is a flat-roofed two-story dark red brick warehouse building, 88 by 120 feet (27 m × 37 m) in plan. It has a one-story, wood-frame, shed-roofed 49 by 13 feet (14.9 m × 4.0 m) addition from 1966 and a one-story, wood-frame gable-roofed 41 by 15 feet (12.5 m × 4.6 m) addition from 1989.

It was deemed notable

because it represents the early twentieth-century commercial activity in Cheyenne, Wyoming. Cheyenne had its origins as a railroad town created in 1867 by the construction of the first transcontinental railroad, making it an important transportation center from its inception. Therefore, its commercial history was inextricably tied to the railroad. The building at 1506 Thomes Avenue was constructed in ca. 1914-15 and was provided with its own railroad siding on the south side, which has been removed. The Colorado and Southern Railroad laid tracks along the north side of the building; these have also been removed. However, the Union Pacific Railroad freight yards are located directly south of West Fifteenth Street, so that the building retains its physical association with the railroad. The building is a well- preserved example of early twentieth-century factory/warehouse architecture and served as a wholesale grocery warehouse from the time it was built until 1974.
