= Albert and Celestine Mabey House =

- U.S. National Register of Historic Places
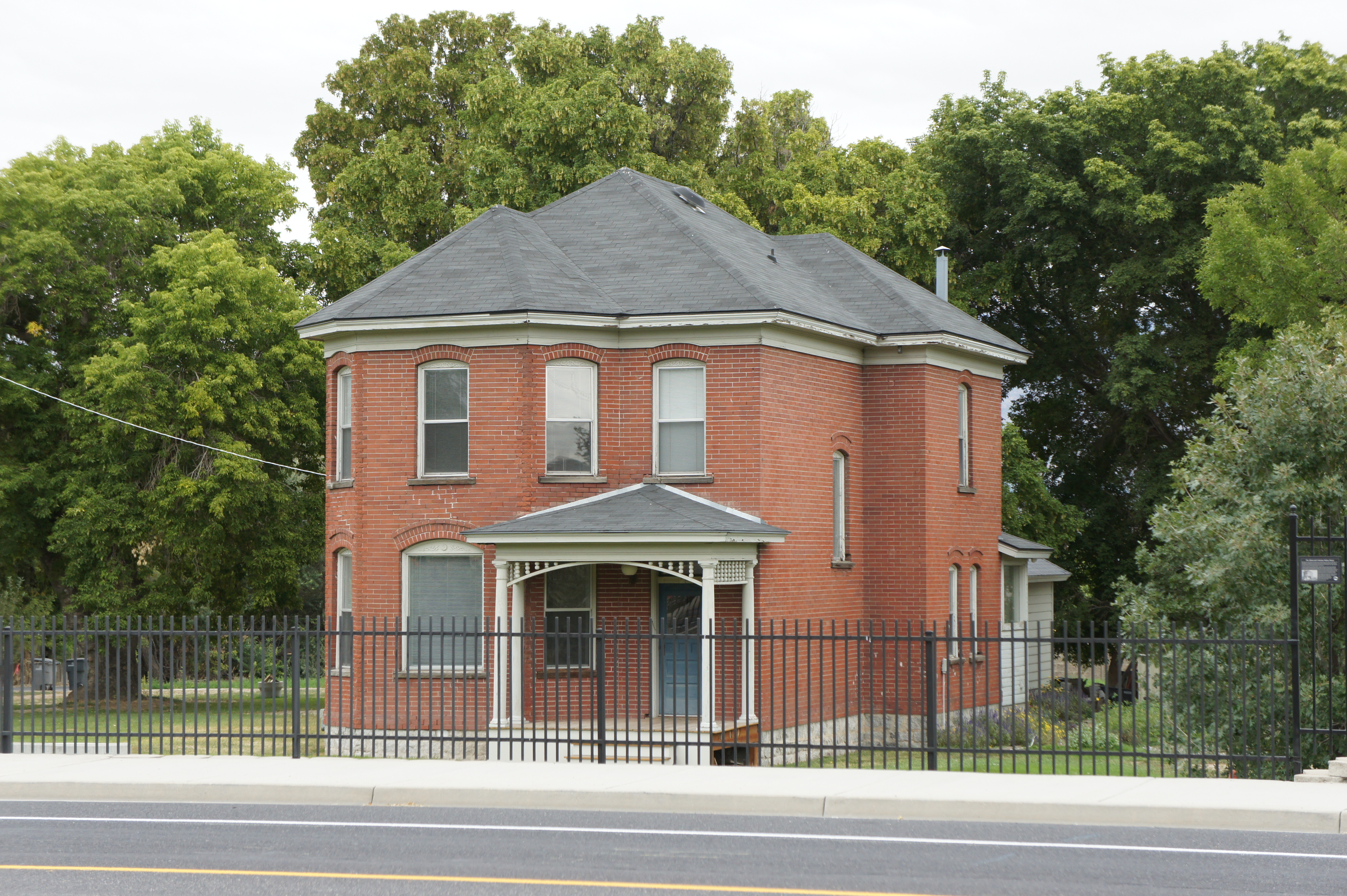
- Mabey House in 2012

- Location within Utah Location within the United States
- Location: 10201 S. 1300 West, South Jordan, Utah
- Coordinates: 40°33′58″N 111°55′43″W
- Area: .43 acres (0.17 ha)
- Built: 1898
- Architectural style: Italianate, Victorian
- MPS: South Jordan, Utah MPS
- NRHP reference No.: 13000641
- Added to NRHP: August 27, 2013

The Albert and Celestine Mabey House, at 10201 S. 1300 West in South Jordan, Utah, was listed on the National Register of Historic Places in 2013.

It is an Italianate and Victorian house built in 1898.
