= Nielsen-Sanderson House =

- U.S. National Register of Historic Places
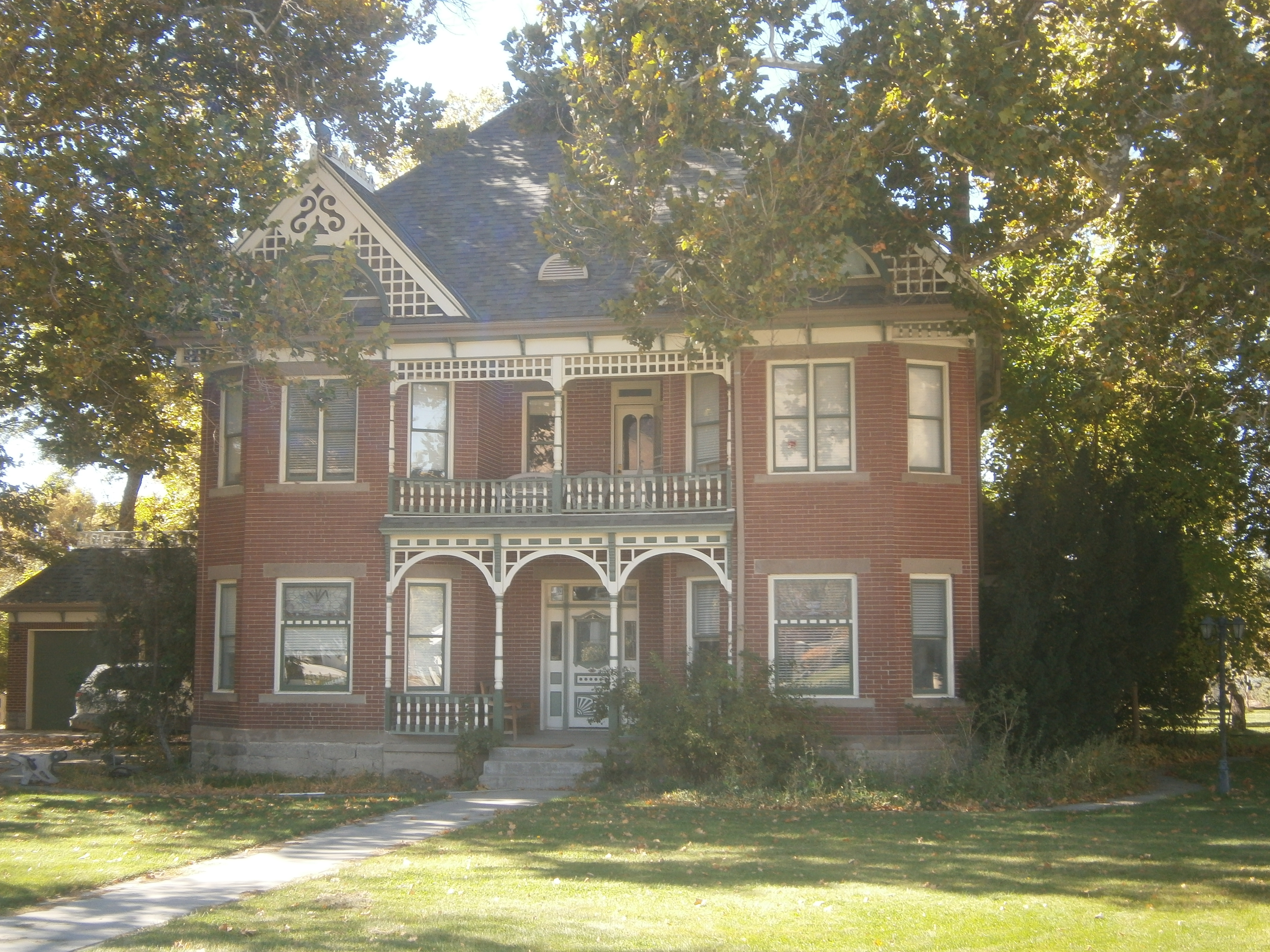

- Location within Utah Location within the United States
- Location: 12758 S. Fort St., Draper, Utah
- Coordinates: 40°31′11″N 111°51′53″W
- Built: 1937
- MPS: Draper, Utah MPS
- NRHP reference No.: 100003043
- Added to NRHP: October 22, 2018

The Nielsen-Sanderson House at 12758 S. Fort St. in Draper, Utah, USA, was listed on the National Register of Historic Places in 2018.

Its listing was noted by the Draper Historical Preservation Commission.
