= Sandy Second Ward Chapel =

- U.S. National Register of Historic Places
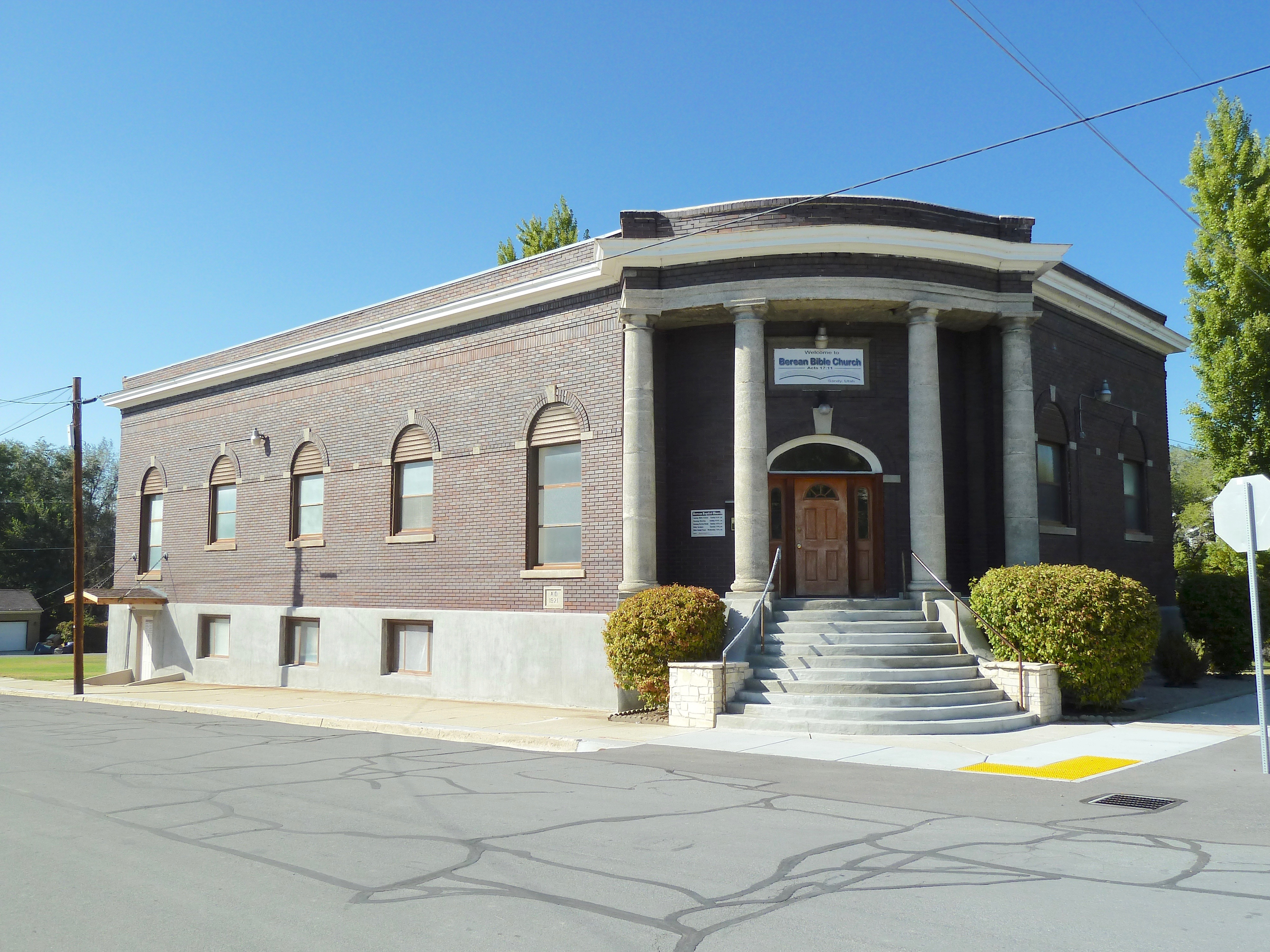

- Location within Utah Location within the United States
- Location: 8630 South 60 East, Sandy, Utah
- Coordinates: 40°35′41″N 111°52′42″W
- Area: 0.8 acres (0.32 ha)
- Built: 1921
- Architect: Joseph Don Carlos Young
- Architectural style: Classical Revival
- MPS: Sandy City MPS
- NRHP reference No.: 97000638
- Added to NRHP: July 9, 1997

The Sandy Second Ward Chapel (formerly known as the Berean Baptist Church and the Anchor Baptist Church) is a location in Sandy, Utah listed on the National Register of Historic Places. It was designed by the architect Don Carlos Young, a son of Brigham Young. It was later sold by the Church of Jesus Christ of Latter-day Saints.

It is built of dark maroon brick on a concrete foundation. A parapet mostly hides the building's low roof. It has four Tuscan columns made of granite-like cast aggregate at its front entrance.
