= Orlando H. and Emma H. Hardcastle House =

- U.S. National Register of Historic Places
- Location within Utah Location within the United States
- Location: 8751 South 40 East, Sandy, Utah
- Coordinates: 40.592574°N 111.889433°W
- Area: 0.3 acres (0.12 ha)
- Built: c.1893
- MPS: Sandy City MPS
- NRHP reference No.: 99001560
- Added to NRHP: December 9, 1999

The Orlando H. and Emma H. Hardcastle House, at 8751 South 40 East in Sandy, Utah, was built around 1893. It was listed on the National Register of Historic Places in 1999.

It is a one-story cross-wing frame house, upon a stone and concrete foundation, with drop siding. The house, in 1999, retained many of its original Victorian Eclectic details such as the lathe-turned posts and scroll-cut fan brackets."

It was a home of Orlando Heathcote Hardcastle (February 26, 1863 - February 7, 1932), who was born in Sheffield, England, and who immigrated to Utah with his family when he was around 13 years old. It was a home of Emma Hardcastle (October 31, 1864 - June 19, 1940), who was born in West Jordan, Utah. They were married on February 19, 1882, and probably settled then in Sandy. Orlando worked at the Mingo smelter in Sandy, as a foreman and shift boss, until it closed in 1901. Then he then worked at the American Smelting and Refining plant in Murray, Utah. He was an active member of the International Order of Odd Fellows.
