= William McLachlan Farmhouse =

- U.S. National Register of Historic Places
- Location within Utah
- Location: 4499 S. 3200 West, Salt Lake City, Utah
- Coordinates: 40°40′23″N 111°57′58″W
- Area: 1.1 acres (0.45 ha)
- Built: 1884
- Built by: McLachlan, William
- NRHP reference No.: 80003928
- Added to NRHP: February 14, 1980

The William McLachlan Farmhouse, at 4499 S. 3200 West, in what is now West Valley City, Utah in Salt Lake County, Utah, listed on the National Register of Historic Places in 1980.

It was built originally as a 22 by 21 feet (6.7 m × 6.4 m) brick and adobe house, during 1884–1885. The two rooms are adobe lined underneath plaster. The masonry work was done by Ed Ashton, and according to McLachlan's journal a man named Bridge did the plastering.

The house was built by William McLachlan, a polygamist, who was "like many of the less wealthy polygamists of the period, extremely distressed by the consequences of anti-polygamy raids. In order that his wives not be left penniless should he be arrested and imprisoned, McLachlan purchased land and built this home in a then-remote area "over Jordan". When it was completed in March 1885 it became home for Maggie Naismith, his second wife, and her five children. McLachlan himself vanished into the underground for nearly eight years. Part of the time he was employed as a carpenter on the Manti temple and used his earnings there to support his families. His wives were visited as often as it was safe, and Margaret received title to her house in 1886 to protect her and her husband from loss of property should he be caught and prosecuted. Fortunately, McLachlan was never brought to trial." However, he was unable to complete the construction of this house, and death by diphtheria of three sons in 1894 contributed to his failure to make a success of the farm.
