= James A. and Janet Muir House =

- U.S. National Register of Historic Places
- Location within Utah Location within the United States
- Location: 2940 E Mount Jordan Rd., Sandy, Utah
- Coordinates: 40°34′16″N 111°48′30″W
- MPS: Historic Resources of Sandy, Utah
- NRHP reference No.: 100003042
- Added to NRHP: October 22, 2018

The James A. and Janet Muir House, at 2940 E Mount Jordan Rd. in Sandy, Utah, was listed on the National Register of Historic Places in 2018.

It was listed in conjunction with the study "Historic Resources of Sandy, Utah". It was deemed to have "local significance under Criterion B for Muir’s association with the agricultural and social history of Sandy, Utah, especially during the "Mining, Smelting and Small Farm Era, 1871-circa 1910" category of the Historic Resources of Sandy, Utah, Multiple Property Submission."
