= Jordan School District Administration Building =

- U.S. National Register of Historic Places
- Location within Utah Location within the United States
- Location: 9361 S. 400 East, Sandy, Utah
- Coordinates: 40.581576°N 111.880296°W
- Area: less than one acre
- Built: 1935
- Architectural style: PWA Moderne
- MPS: Public Works Buildings TR
- NRHP reference No.: 85000810
- Added to NRHP: April 1, 1985

The Jordan School District Administration Building, at 9361 S. 400 East in Sandy, Utah, was listed on the National Register of Historic Places in 1985.

It was built in PWA Moderne style in 1935 as part of a Public Works Administration project.

It appears that the building no longer exists. (Note: Per the Utah State Historical Society form, the property's address is 9361 S. 400 East in Sandy, Utah. The building is supposed to be on the southwest corner of a 22.26 acre property. Looking at property on northeast corner of 9400 St. and S. 300 St. E. (i.e. the southwest corner of a property which spans over where E. 400 St. would run) various ways yields: a) Google Streetview imagery dated June 2019 shows a new building under construction just to the east of an existing building, when accessed October 18, 2019. The existing building appears to be modern, seems not incorporating the historic building. b) Further, Bing aerial view shows the pre-existing building there previously, which appears also not to be or incorporate the historic building, labelled as Canyons Student Support Center; c) The same building viewed in Google Satellite view is labelled Canyons School District Administrative Office.)
