= Joseph E. and Mina W. Mickelsen House =

Historic house in Utah, United States

- U.S. National Register of Historic Places
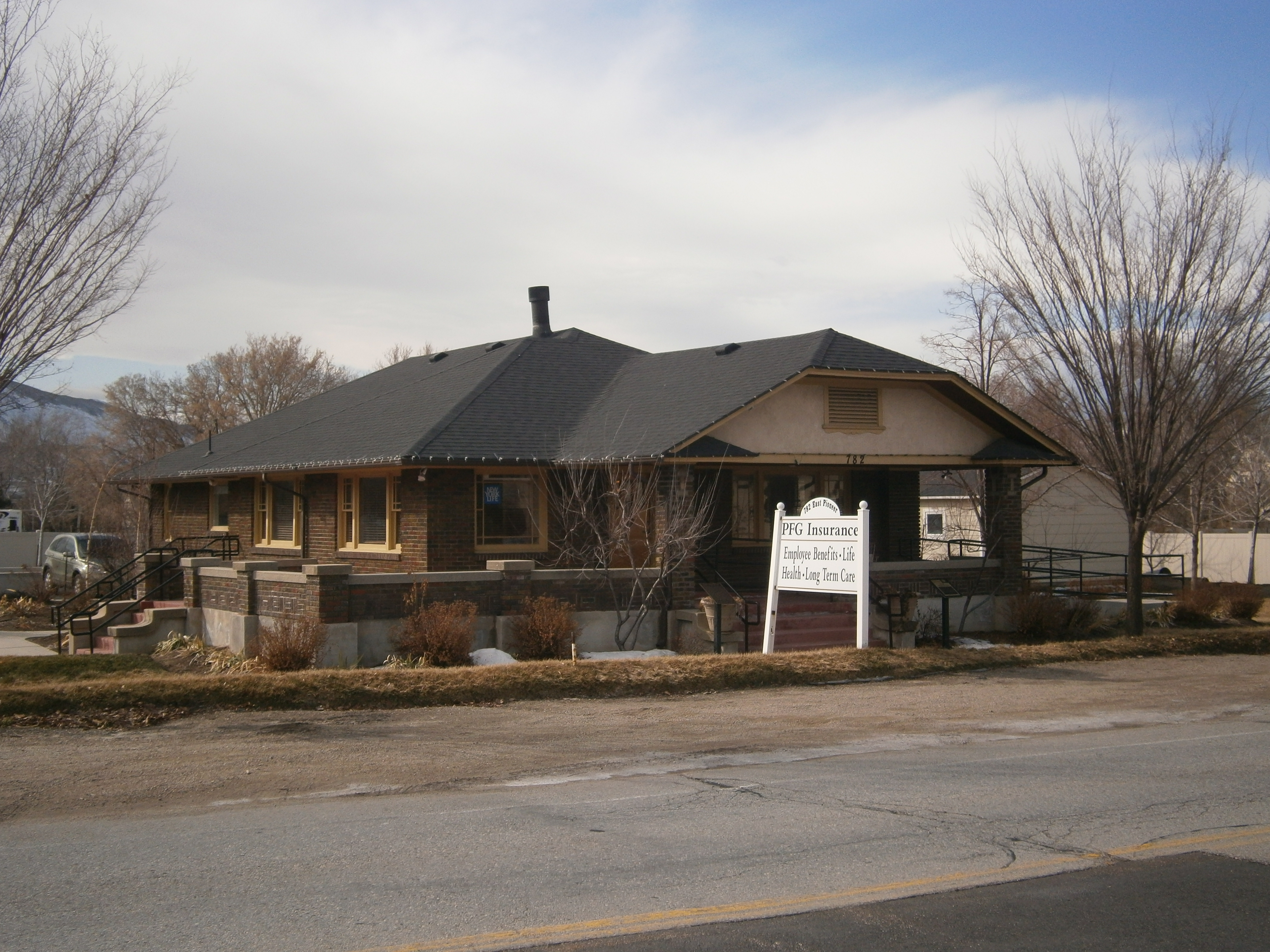

- Location within Utah Location within the United States
- Location: 782 E. Pioneer Rd., Draper, Utah
- Coordinates: 40°31′30″N 111°52′09″W
- Area: 0.5 acres (0.20 ha)
- Built: 1929
- Built by: Vawdrey, Cyrus W.
- Architectural style: Bungalow/Craftsman
- MPS: Draper, Utah MPS
- NRHP reference No.: 04000405
- Added to NRHP: May 6, 2004

The Joseph E. and Mina W. Mickelsen House is a historic house located at 782 East Pioneer Road in Draper, Utah.

== Description and history ==
Constructed by Cyrus W. Vawdrey in 1929, it is a one-story, hip-roofed, Bungalow-style brick house with wide eaves. Originally located at 1020 East Pioneer Road, the house was moved to its present location on August 7, 2002, to make way for the Draper City municipal building.

It was listed on the National Register of Historic Places on May 6, 2004.
