= Warenski-Duvall Commercial Building and Apartments =

- U.S. National Register of Historic Places
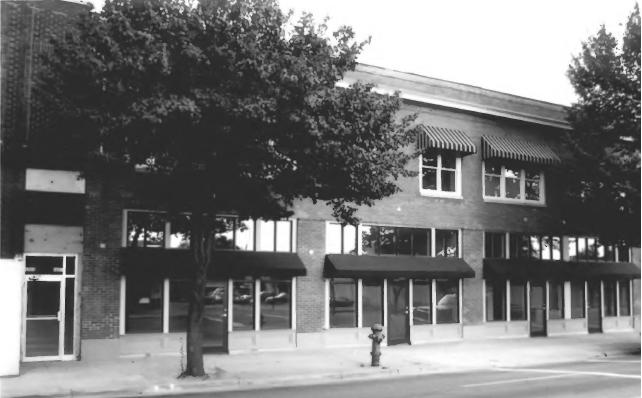
- The Warenski-Duvall Building

- Location within Utah Location within the United States
- Location: 4867 South State Street. Murray, Utah
- Coordinates: 40°39′56″N 111°53′17″W
- Area: 1.00 acre (0.40 ha)
- Built: 1915
- Architectural style: Commercial Style
- NRHP reference No.: 00000521
- Added to NRHP: May 19, 2000

The Warenski-Duvall Commercial Building and Apartments, built in 1915, is a two-story brick, two part commercial block that is listed in National Register of Historic Places. The building is significant for its role in the early urbanization of Murray, Utah. The Warenski-Duvall building represents a building-type common during the early-twentieth century development of Murray's commercial business district and it is also part of the Murray Downtown Historic District. The building's owner was Edward J. Warenski, an early resident of Murray who owned a saloon and grocery store on State Street. Warenski and his family lived just north of the store. In 1923, the Duvall family purchased the building and divided the upper floor into apartments where family members and other workers in downtown Murray lived.

The Warenski-Duvall Commercial Building and Apartments is a transitional building in the context of Murray City's development. This building represents the changes brought to the economic and social structure of the community in the first quarter of the twentieth century. Between 1902 and the 1930s, commercial buildings lined State Street from 4700 South to 5000 South. Most of these businesses were owned by second-generation Mormons who had left their farms for more lucrative employment, but a few were owned by immigrant families originally brought to Murray by the smelter industry.

Edward Charles and Susannah Aldian Warenski were immigrants from Poland and England, respectively, who settled in Salt Lake City in the 1860s. By the start of the 20th century, Edward, Susannah and their children had moved to Murray. The Warenski family owned most of the block between 4800 South and Vine Street, west of State Street. The older store that existed on this site was demolished and the two-story brick Warenski building was constructed in 1915. Among the first retail tenants of the building after the Warenski grocery store were Frank Metcalfs Automotive Repair & Accessories Company at 4865 South State, Granite Furniture Company at 4867 South State, and Carlisle Motor Company at 4877 South State.

On June 6, 1923, the Warenskis sold the commercial building to John W. Johnson in 1923. John Johnson and his brother-in-law, Tony Duvall, remodeled the upper floor into apartments. Tony Duvall also built and managed the Gem Theatre (see Iris Theater) just to the north of the Warenski building. At their new location, the Johnsons and Duvalls followed the practice of living in apartments above the theater. By 1925, Tony and his wife, Marguerite Morris Duvall, were managing the Gem Theatre and living in what were called the Duvall Apartments in the former Warenski building. Minnie Torrance Duvall, who helped finance her family's involvement in the theaters, also moved to the Duvall Apartments in Murray.

In 1926, Tony Duvall was given "control of attorney" to take over the Duvall Building, as the building was by then known. The anchor tenant was the Thomas Martin & Company general merchandise store that occupied the largest retail space. The Murray Post Office took over the space on February 1, 1926. The tenancy of all three retail spaces remained constant for the next two decades with the J.P. O'Brien Jewelry Store at 4869, the Leader Clothing Store at 4873, and the post office at 4879 South State. The Duvall Apartments were occupied throughout this period by members of the Duvall family and others, most of whom worked in Murray's central business district.

== See also ==
- Murray Theater
