= S.J. Mickelsen Hardware Store and Lumber Yard =

- Mickelsen, S.J., Hardware Store and Lumber Yard
- U.S. National Register of Historic Places
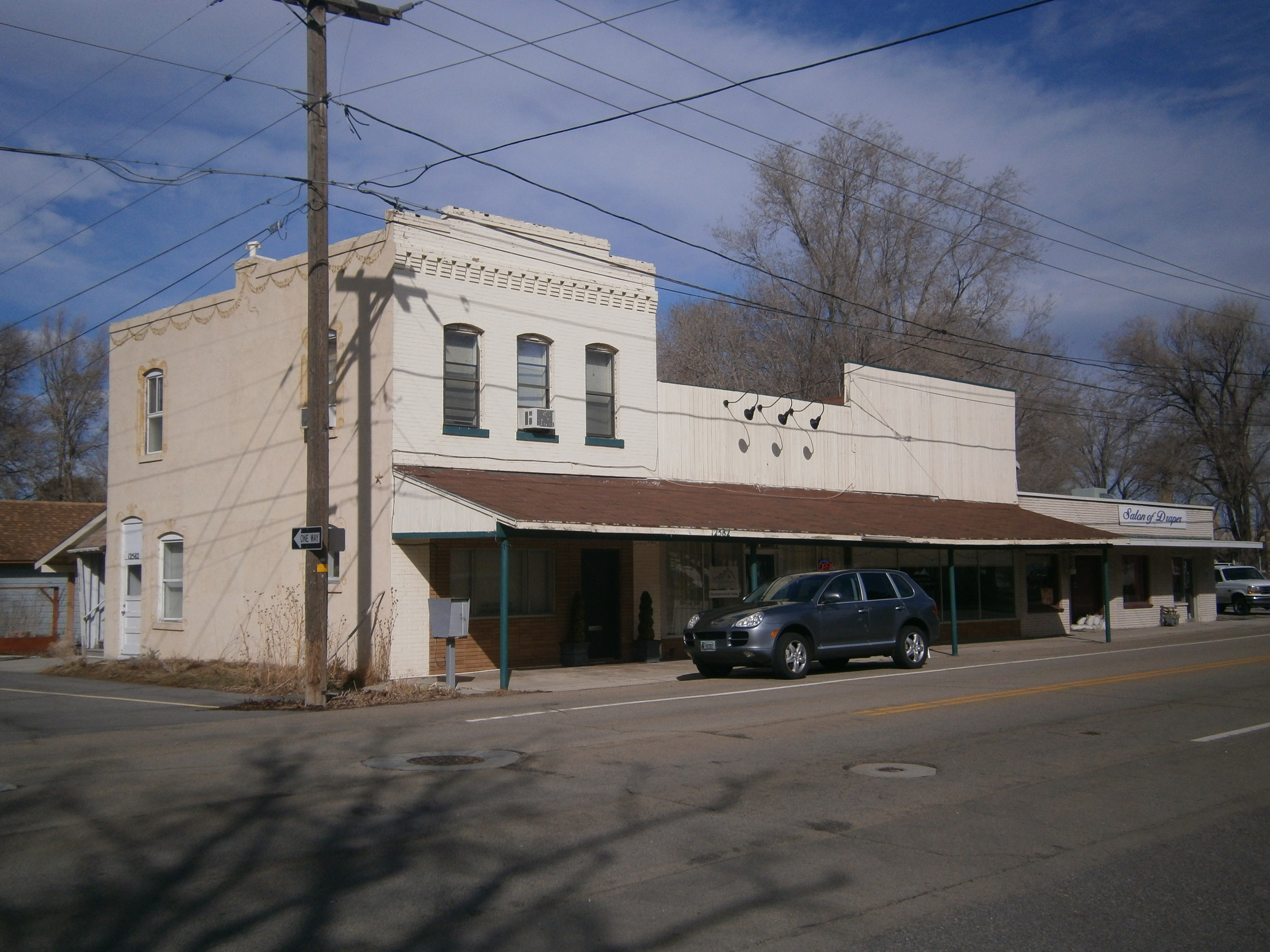

- Location within Utah Location within the United States
- Location: 12580-12582 S. Fort St., Draper, Utah
- Coordinates: 40°31′22″N 111°51′51″W
- Area: 0.4 acres (0.16 ha)
- Built: 1912-32
- Architectural style: Early Commercial
- MPS: Draper, Utah MPS
- NRHP reference No.: 04000406
- Added to NRHP: May 6, 2004

The S.J. Mickelsen Hardware Store and Lumber Yard, located at 12580-12582 S. Fort St. in Draper, Utah, dates from 1912. It was listed on the National Register of Historic Places in 2004; the listing included five contributing buildings.

It is a six-building complex, with a two-story brick building built in 1912 and other buildings constructed as late as 1932. It served as a lumber and hardware store, and, during 1914–1961, served as the post office for Draper.
