= Matthew and Johanna Rowan House =

Historic house in Utah, United States

- U.S. National Register of Historic Places
- The Rowan House in 2026

- Location within Utah Location within the United States
- Location: 198 W. Winchester St., Murray, Utah
- Coordinates: 40.633302°N 111.896872°W
- Area: .26 acres (0.11 ha)
- Built: 1887
- MPS: Historic Resources of Murray City, Utah, 1859-1967
- NRHP reference No.: 100004478
- Added to NRHP: September 30, 2019

The Matthew and Johanna Rowan House, at 198 W. Winchester St. in Murray, Utah, was listed on the National Register of Historic Places in 2019.

It is a one-and-a-half-story central-block-with-projecting bays-type house built in 1887. It has Victorian Eclectic styling.
