= Magna Community Baptist Church =

Historic church in Utah, United States

- U.S. National Register of Historic Places
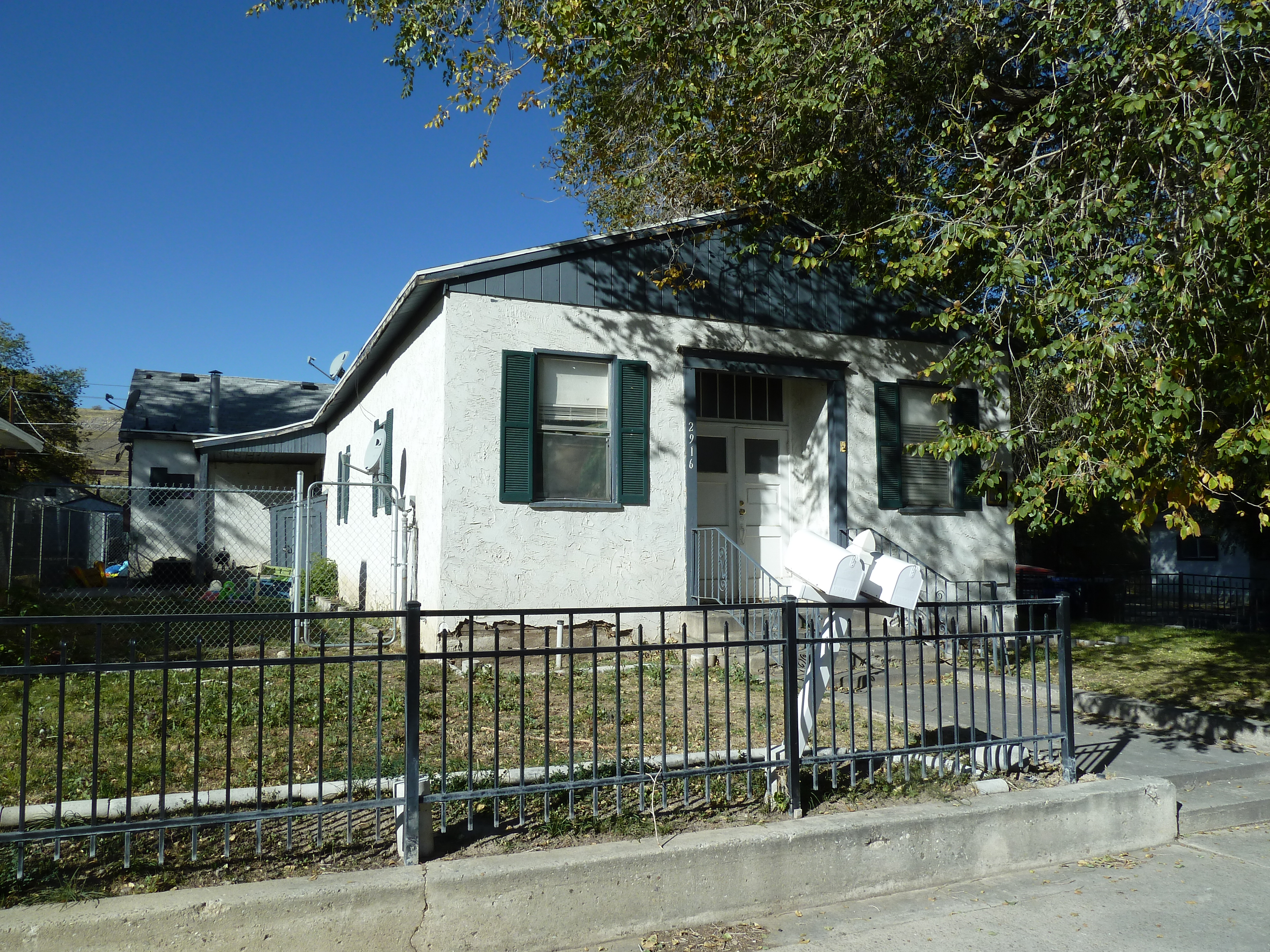

- Location within Utah Location within the United States
- Location: 2916 S. 8900 West, Magna, Utah
- Coordinates: 40°42′26″N 112°6′13″W
- Area: less than one acre
- Built: 1928-33
- NRHP reference No.: 86001233
- Added to NRHP: June 5, 1986

Magna Community Baptist Church (also known as Magna Community Church) is a historic church at 2916 S. 8900 West in Magna, Utah. It was built during 1928-33 and was added to the National Register of Historic Places in 1986.

It was then deemed "significant as the first and only Protestant church building constructed in the town of Magna and for its important role in the religious affairs in the community."

The building has had its cupola removed and is now used as a multi-family dwelling.
