= Mary Smith House =

Historic house in Utah, United States

- U.S. National Register of Historic Places
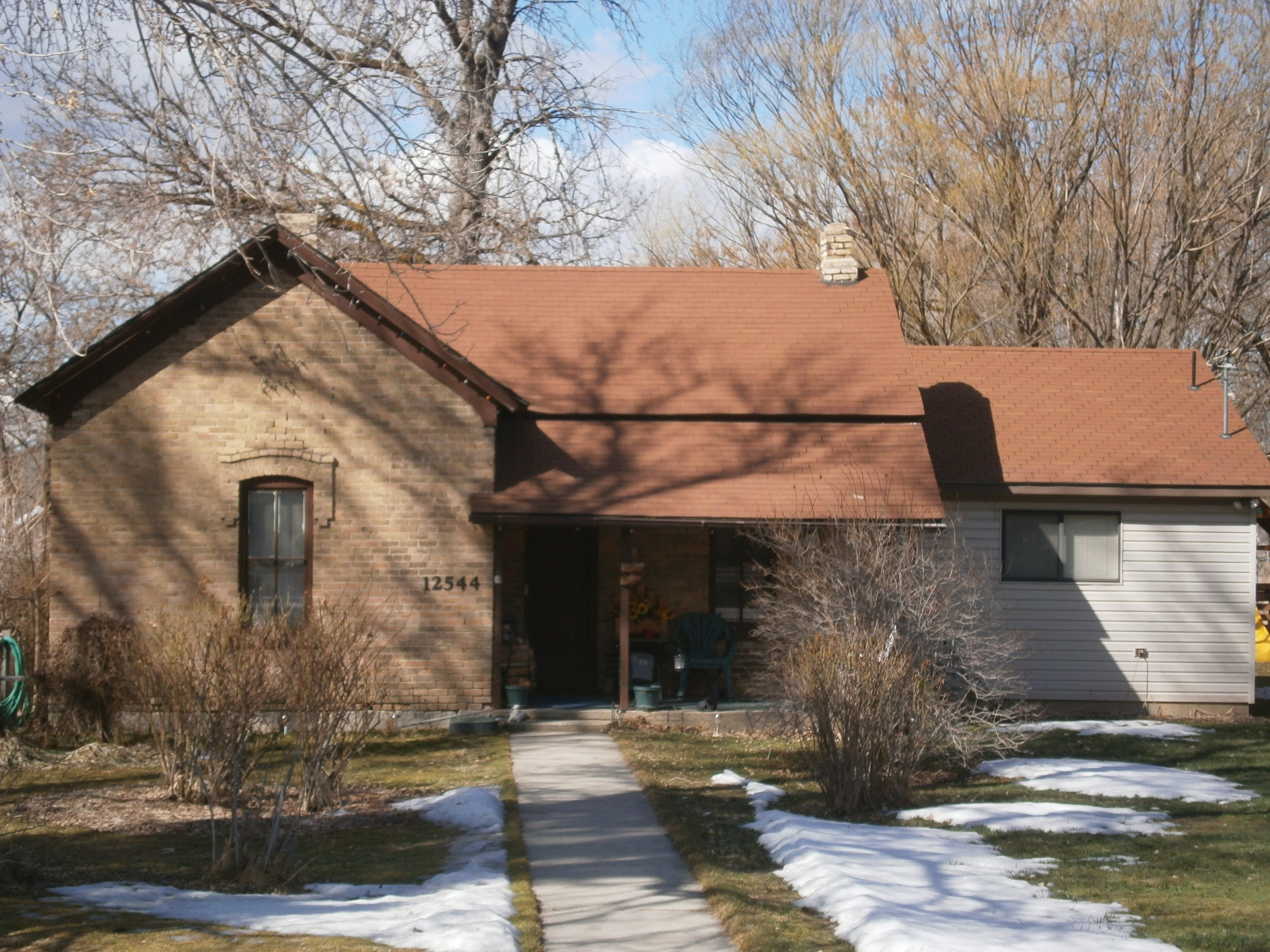

- Location within Utah Location within the United States
- Location: 12544 S. Relation St. (1565 East), Draper, Utah
- Coordinates: 40°31′24″N 111°50′49″W
- Area: less than one acre
- Built: 1883
- Architectural style: vernacular cross-wing
- NRHP reference No.: 94000292
- Added to NRHP: April 15, 1994

The Mary Smith House is a house on the National Register of Historic Places in Draper, Utah, United States. It was listed in 1994.

The house was built around 1883 by Lauritz Smith for his first wife, Mary Kristine Mickelsdotter Smith, to avoid prosecution under the Edmunds Act. Since this law made "cohabitation" illegal, the theory was that if he created a new house for Mary and had his second wife Hannah in his main house he would avoid prosecution.

It is a one-story brick house built on a granite foundation. It has a cross-wing plan and intersecting gable roofs.
