= Benjamin and Olivia Meek House =

Historic house in Utah, United States

- U.S. National Register of Historic Places
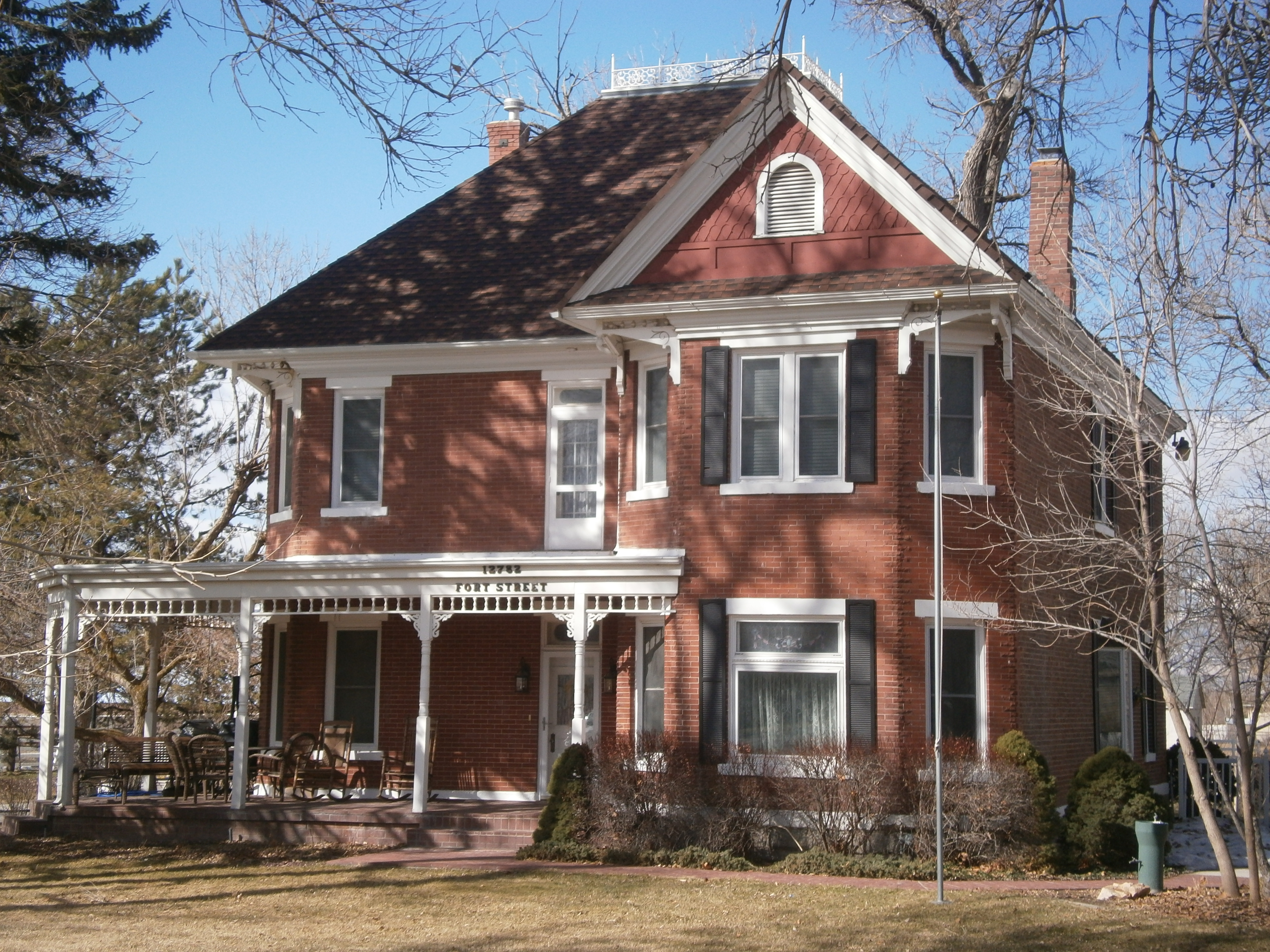

- Location within Utah Location within the United States
- Location: 12782 South Fort St., Draper, Utah
- Coordinates: 40°31′9″N 111°51′52″W
- Area: 2 acres (0.81 ha)
- Built: c. 1898
- Architectural style: Late Victorian, Central block
- NRHP reference No.: 01001282
- Added to NRHP: November 29, 2001

The Benjamin and Olivia Meek House is a historic house located at 12782 South Fort Street in Draper, Utah.

== Description and history ==
The 2 1/2-story house was built in about 1898. According to its 2001 NRHP nomination, the house is significant "as one of only four remaining eligible central-block houses, two-stories or taller and all located on this street, remaining in Draper, Utah", for its Victorian style representing prosperity in Draper, and for its association with the Nielson family (Olivia Meek's family) that was important and successful in sheep and cattle raising in Draper.

It was listed on the National Register of Historic Places on November 29, 2001. The listing included two contributing buildings and one other contributing structure.
