= William D. Kuhre House =

- U.S. National Register of Historic Places
- Location within Utah Location within the United States
- Location: 8586 S. One Hundred and Fiftieth E, Sandy, Utah
- Coordinates: 40°35′44″N 111°53′07″W
- Area: 0.6 acres (0.24 ha)
- Built: 1890, c.1910
- NRHP reference No.: 87001175
- Added to NRHP: July 6, 1987

The William D. Kuhre House, at 8586 S. 150 East in Sandy, Utah, was built in 1890. It was listed on the National Register of Historic Places in 1987.

It was substantially remodeled around 1910, with addition of a full-width porch on the front, stuccoing of the second-story exterior walls, and more, in style typical of early twentieth-century architecture, not of the 1890s Victorian period in which the house was built. Its arrangement is of foursquare type.

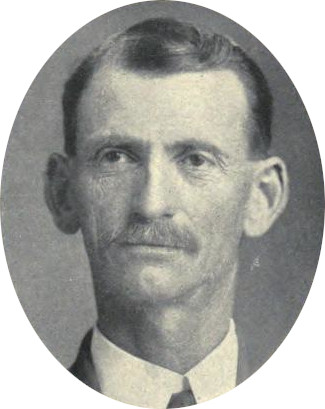
William D. Kuhre

The house was deemed significant for association with William D. Kuhre, who lived here from 1890 until the 1930s. He was mayor of Sandy, was a member of the school board for many years, was bishop of the Sandy Ward of the LDS church, and was a partner in Jensen & Kuhre Lumber and Hardware Company.

Kuhre, born January 21, 1863, at Ephraim, in Sanpete County, Utah was orphaned on October 17, 1865 when his Danish immigrant parents were killed by Indians under Chief Blackhawk; young William was taken but was left unharmed. He was adopted by John and Ellen Dobbie who moved to Salt Lake City and brought up William there. William moved to Sandy in 1881 and worked as bookkeeper at the Pioneer Ore Sampling Mill for many years.

The property has two more contributing buildings, including an old summer kitchen and wash house.
