= Edward and Irene Hobbs House =

Historic house in Utah, United States

- U.S. National Register of Historic Places
- The Hobbs House in 2026

- Location within Utah Location within the United States
- Location: 487 E. Vine St., Murray, Utah
- Coordinates: 40°39′36″N 111°52′40″W
- MPS: Murray City, Utah MPS
- NRHP reference No.: 100002702
- Added to NRHP: July 23, 2018

The Edward and Irene Hobbs House, at 487 E. Vine St. in Murray, Utah, United States, was listed on the National Register of Historic Places in 2018.
