= Garside-McMullin House =

- U.S. National Register of Historic Places
- Location within Utah Location within the United States
- Location: 10481 S. 1300 West, South Jordan, Utah
- Coordinates: 40.560565°N 111.929975°W
- Area: less than one acre
- Built: 1898
- Architectural style: Queen Anne
- NRHP reference No.: 82004852
- Added to NRHP: December 17, 1982

The Garside-McMullin House, at 10481 S. 1300 West in South Jordan, Utah, was listed on the National Register of Historic Places in 1982.

It is a Queen Anne style house built in 1898. It was deemed significant for its architecture and for its association with two families, the Garsides and the McMullins.

It was used for city offices of South Jordan in the 1960s. The street address given at the property now is 10500, and signage calls it the McMullin House.
