= Ross Hame =

- U.S. National Register of Historic Places
- Location within Utah Location within the United States
- Location: 4769 S Holladay Blvd., Holladay, Utah
- Coordinates: 40°39′58″N 111°49′18″W
- Area: 1.35 acres (0.55 ha)
- Built: 1922-23
- NRHP reference No.: 100002703
- Added to NRHP: July 23, 2018

The Ross Hame, at 4769 S Holladay Blvd. in Holladay, Utah, also known as the William Harvey and Sarah Seegmiller Ross House, was built in 1922–23. It was listed on the National Register of Historic Places in 2018. The listing included two contributing buildings, a contributing structure, and a non-contributing building, on 1.35 acres (0.55 ha).

It was commissioned by William Harvey Ross, who had been president of the Gunnison Sugar Company, an entity financially rescued by William Wrigley Jr., the big chewing gum manufacturer. It was designed by architects Walter E. Ware, Alberto O. Treganza, and Georgius Y. Cannon.

According to its National Register nomination, "Ross Hame is a three-story Tudor Revival villa covered with heavy, roughcast stucco. This stucco has been painted white since at least the 1950s but was likely unpainted or painted a different color when the house was new. The stucco finish is interspersed by false half timbering on the stair tower rising from the house’s front or west-facing façade and on a dormer rising from the house’s back or south-facing roof. This half-timbering together with the house’s flared rooflines, leaded glass windows, and parklike setting grant Ross Hame a storybook English cottage feel."

"Ross Hame’s exterior features roughcast stucco interposed in places by false half-timbering on the Tudor Revival-style house. The house’s interior maintains its original asymmetrical cross-wing floorplan which was designed to take full advantage of the house’s location on a rise above Spring Creek which flows through Ross Hame’s grounds. These grounds include many circa 1922 landscape elements including waterfalls, benches, bridges, lawns, and a tennis court, which is considered a contributing structure. The grounds also feature a contributing caretaker’s cottage which is located directly behind, or east of the main house. The two-story cottage, originally built to serve as a stable and carriage house, features a roughcast plaster exterior and a double pile interior. While the exterior of the cottage remains largely unchanged since its construction in 1922, the interior was divided in half at some point in the 1930s or early 1940s. The northwest side of the cottage was remodeled to be a large garage and storage area while its southeast end was transformed into a residence complete with a living/dining room and adjoining kitchen on the first floor, and two bedrooms and a bathroom on the second floor. The cottage is in good repair, retains its historic integrity, and is a contributing property feature. Behind, or east of this cottage stands a large, three-bay, lean-to garage with wooden plank sides and a corrugated metal roof. The garage dates to the late 1940s or early 1950s and is non-contributing as it was constructed outside the designated period of significance."
