= Emma Olive Dobbs House =

Historic house in Utah, United States

- U.S. National Register of Historic Places
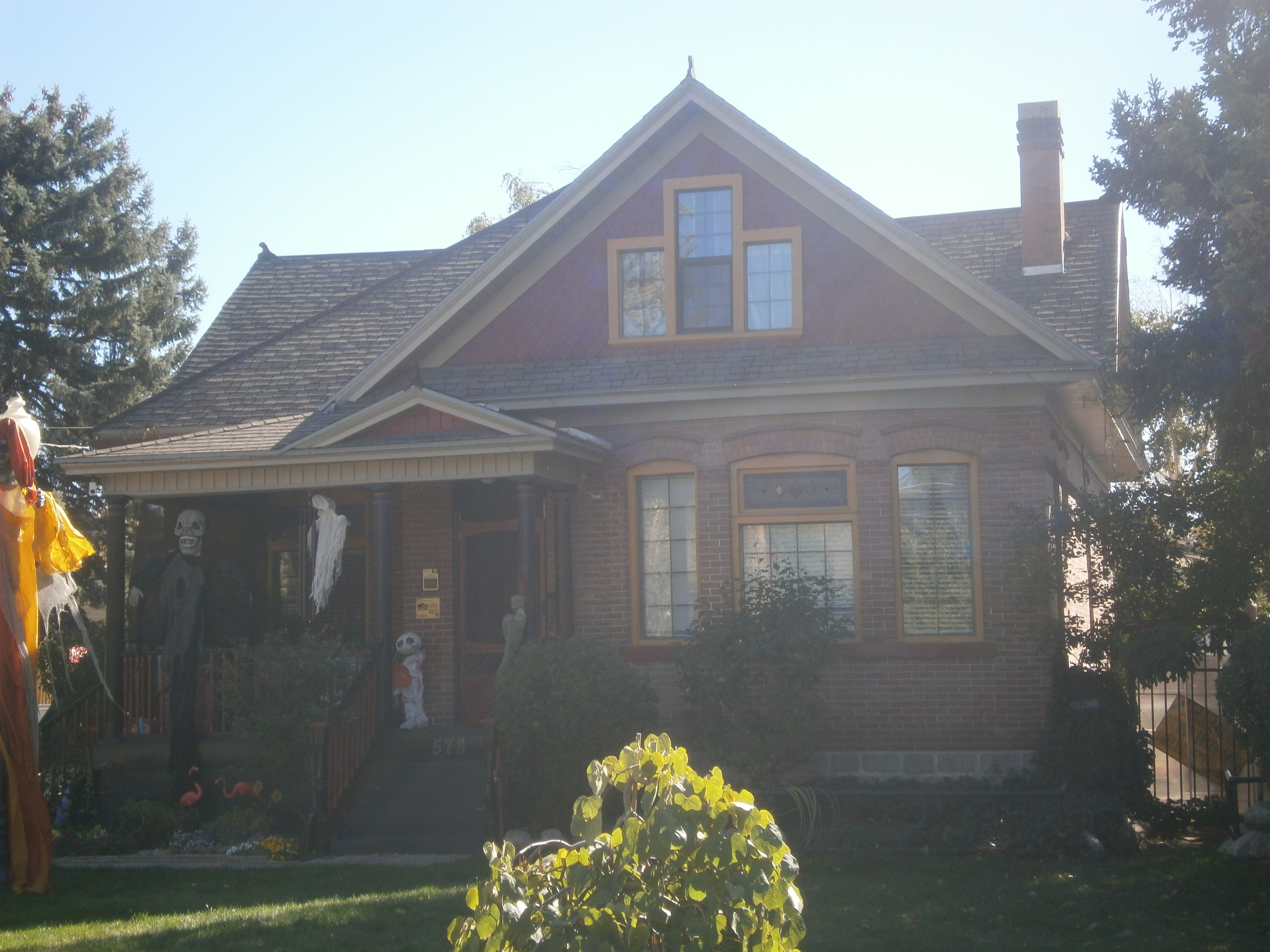

- Location within Utah Location within the United States
- Location: 578 E. Locust St., Sandy, Utah
- Coordinates: 40°35′31″N 111°52′25″W
- Area: less than one acre
- Built: 1905
- MPS: Sandy City MPS
- NRHP reference No.: 96000889
- Added to NRHP: August 8, 1996

The Emma Olive Dobbs House, at 578 E. Locust St. in Sandy, Utah, was built in the years around 1905–10. It was listed on the National Register of Historic Places in 1996.

It is a one-and-one-half-story Victorian style central-block-with-projecting-bays house. It has a front porch with Tuscan columns.

It was deemed significant as one of "the best preserved examples of the central-block-with-projecting-bays constructed during the same time period in Sandy". It was noted that it "is also expressive of the level of craftsmanship attained locally on the construction of such structures, including the use of native materials, such as the granite employed on the foundation."
