= Glen M. and Roxie Walbeck House =

Historic house in Utah, United States

- U.S. National Register of Historic Places
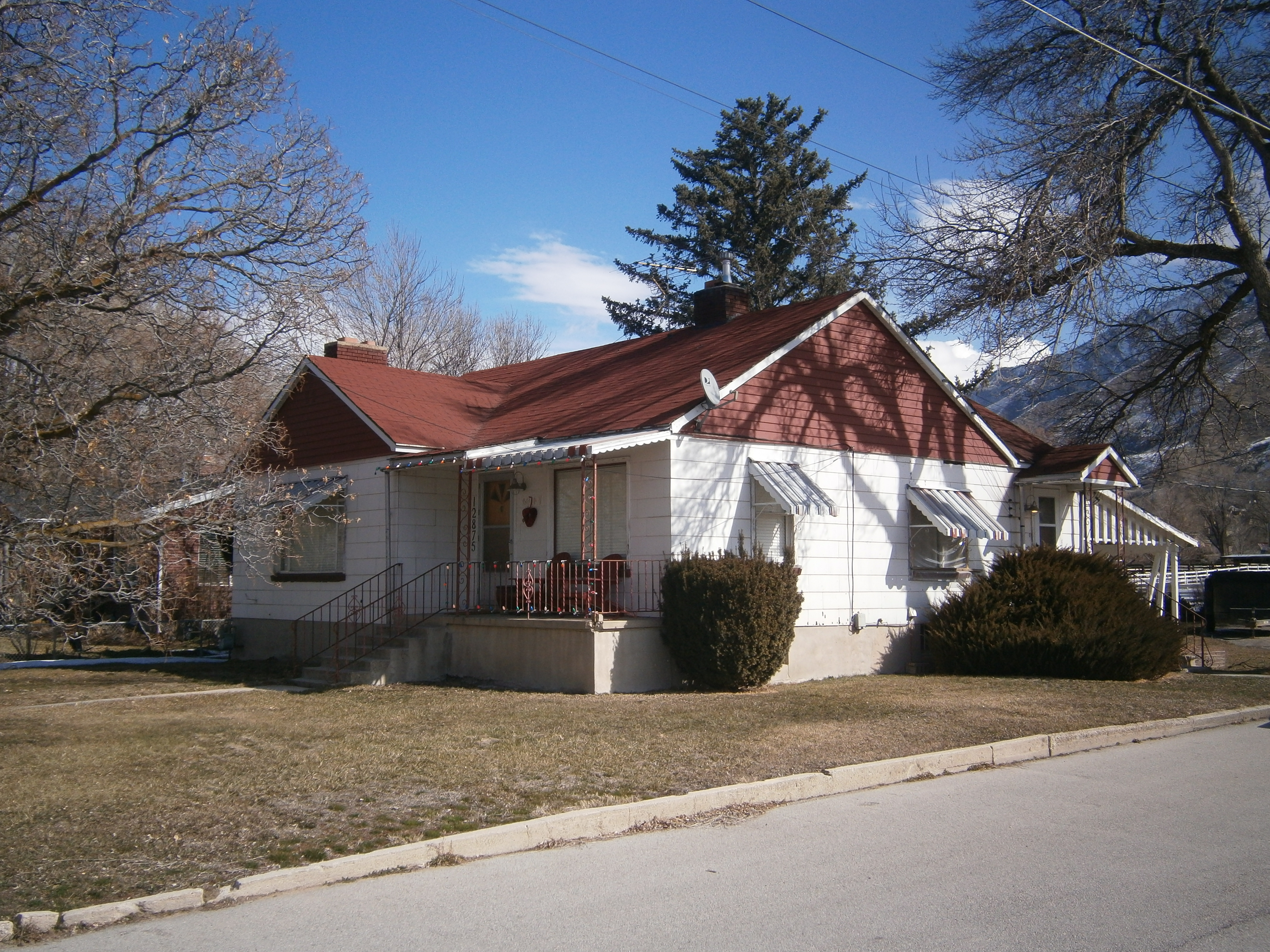

- Location within Utah Location within the United States
- Location: 12875 S. Boulter St., Draper, Utah
- Coordinates: 40°31′4″N 111°50′55″W
- Area: less than one acre
- Built: c1935-1952
- Architectural style: early ranch house
- MPS: Draper, Utah MPS
- NRHP reference No.: 05001630
- Added to NRHP: February 1, 2006

The Glen M. and Roxie Walbeck House, at 12875 S. Boulter St. in Draper, Utah, was built during c.1935–1952 It was listed on the National Register of Historic Places in 2006.

The house is historically significant for its association with the poultry industry in Draper. It was home of Glen M. Walbeck, who was a coal miner and a professional baseball player, and his wife Roxie. The home had chicken coops in the back.
