= Mary Ellen Parmley House =

- U.S. National Register of Historic Places
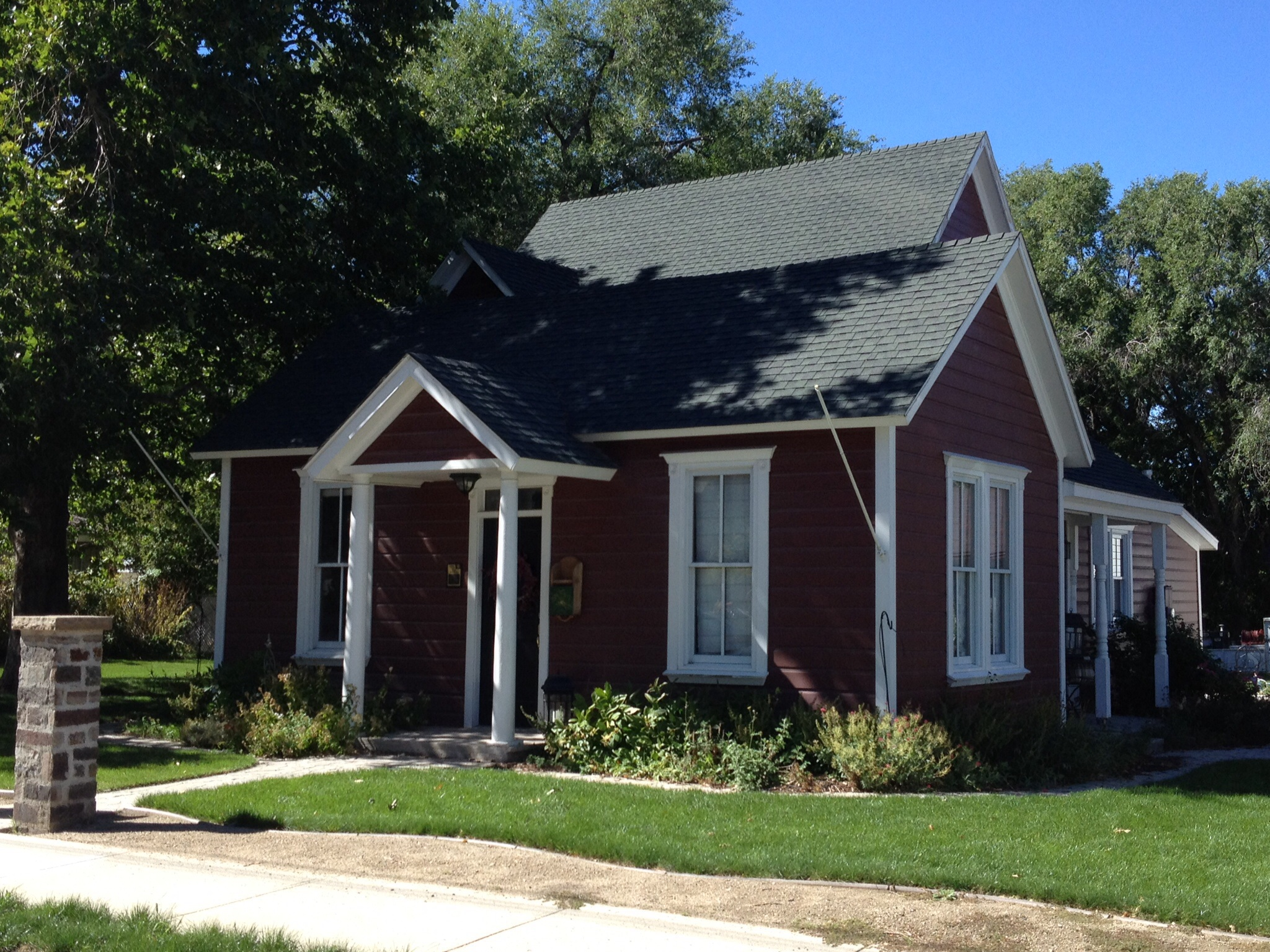

- Location within Utah
- Location: 8850 S. 220 E, Sandy, Utah
- Coordinates: 40°35′29″N 111°53′40″W
- Area: 0.5 acres (0.20 ha)
- Built: c.1898
- MPS: Sandy City MPS
- NRHP reference No.: 00001301
- Added to NRHP: November 6, 2000

The Mary Ellen Parmley House, at 8850 S. 220 East in Sandy, Utah, is a one-story, wood-frame house built originally around 1898 as a Hall-Parlor cottage. It has had several additions on its west side. The first addition plus original portion make a T-shaped crosswing form.

It was listed on the National Register of Historic Places in 2000. And it is also known as 316 South 220 East.
