= Alfred and Hennie Huetter House =

Historic house in Utah, United States

- U.S. National Register of Historic Places
- The Huetter House in 2026

- Location within Utah Location within the United States
- Location: 187 E. 5600 South, Murray, Utah
- Coordinates: 40°38′57″N 111°53′10″W
- Area: .45 acres (0.18 ha)
- Built: 1936
- Built by: Alfred Huetter
- MPS: Historic Resources of Murray City, Utah, 1859-1967
- NRHP reference No.: 100004477
- Added to NRHP: September 30, 2019

The Alfred and Hennie Huetter House, at 187 E. 5600 South in Murray, Utah, was built in 1936. It was listed on the National Register of Historic Places in 2019.

The house is a one-and-a-half-story "cottage with English Tudor and eclectic Swiss/German period cottage stylistic details." It has a timber-framed stucco exterior.
