= Perry and Agnes Wadsworth Fitzgerald House =

Historic house in Utah, United States

- U.S. National Register of Historic Places
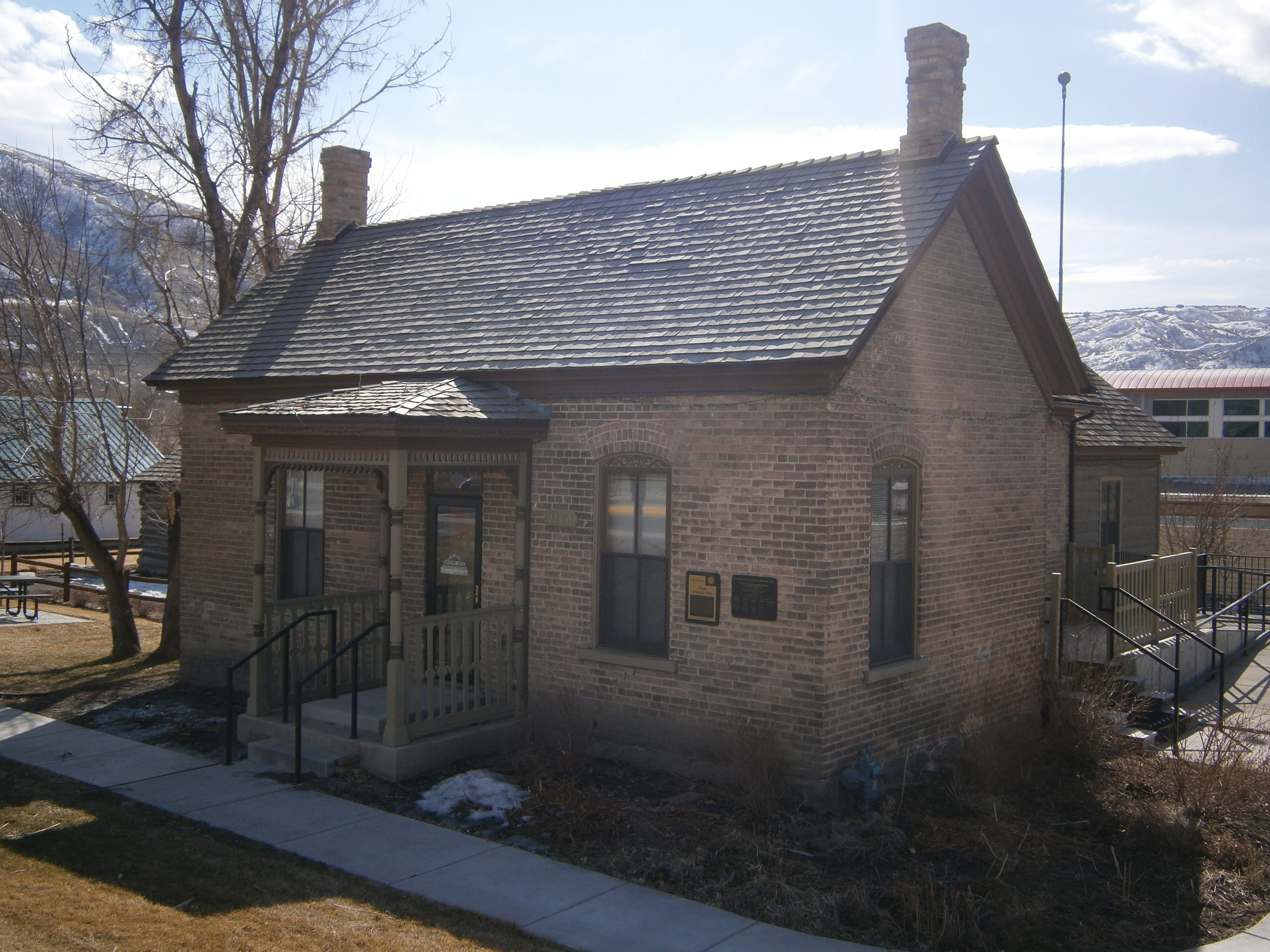
- The Draper Area Chamber of Commerce is headquartered in the house.

- Location within Utah Location within the United States
- Location: 1160 East Pioneer Road; Draper, Utah; United States
- Coordinates: 40°31′30″N 111°51′22″W
- Area: 4.4 acres (1.8 ha)
- Built: 1870
- Architectural style: Late Victorian, Crosswing
- MPS: Draper, Utah MPS
- NRHP reference No.: 04000404; 100009193 (decrease)

Significant dates
- Added to NRHP: May 6, 2004
- Boundary decrease: July 10, 2023

The Perry and Agnes Wadsworth Fitzgerald House, at 1160 East Pioneer Road in Draper, Utah, United States, was built in 1870 as the home for Perry Fitzgerald's third polygamous wife Agnes, who had 13 children. It was listed on the National Register of Historic Places in 2004.

== Description ==
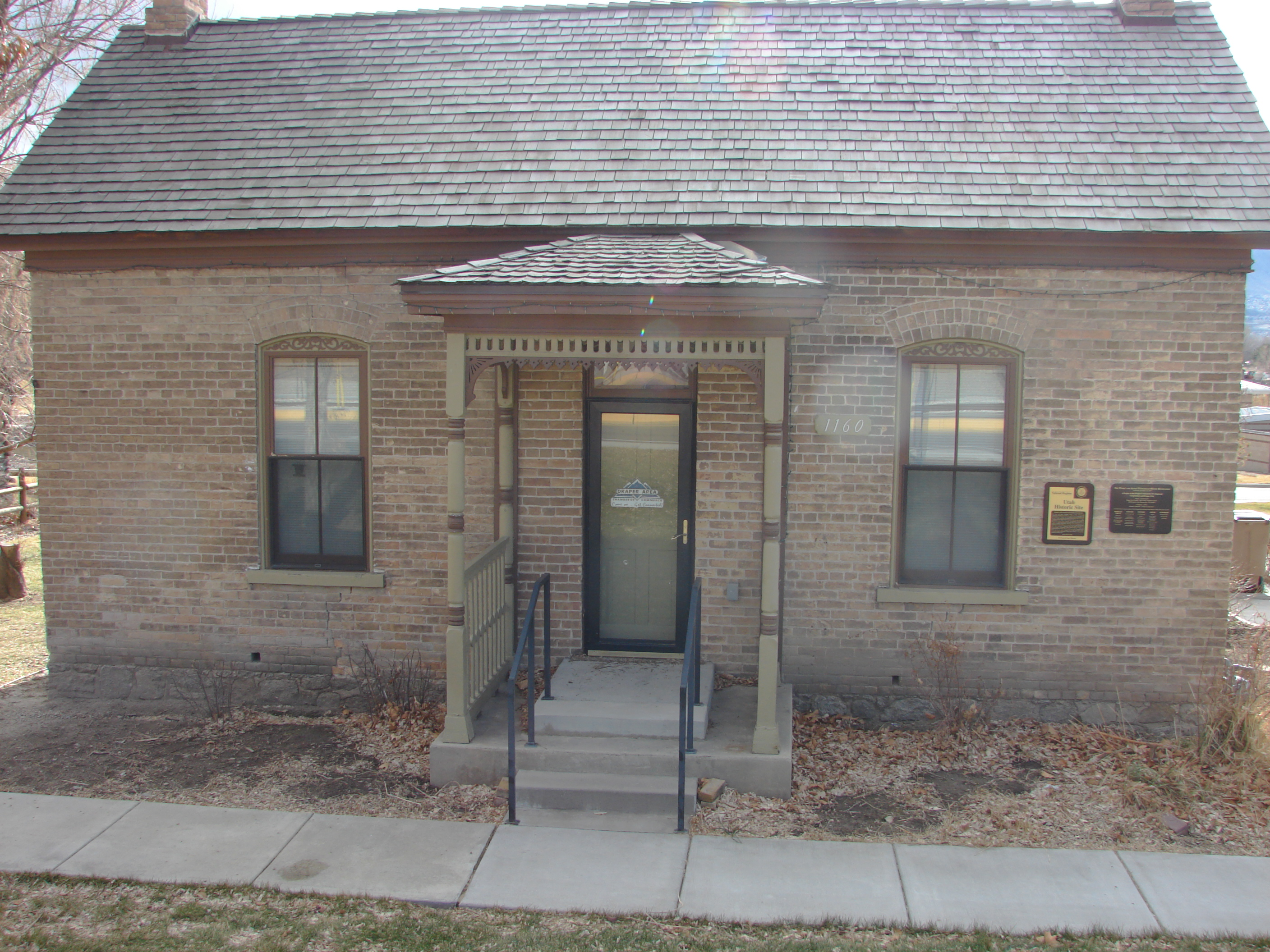
Front view, January 2015

The property was assessed for its historic significance in 2004, when a Draper city library was planned to be built upon the property. A historic log cabin had already been moved to a city park and preserved. Called the Perry Fitzgerald Cabin, it was built around 1850 and "became a barn after the family built a brick home in the 1860s. The three-room cabin is currently located in the Draper City Park. It was moved from its original site and reassembled in the park around 1990."

The Perry and Agnes Wadsworth Fitzgerald House was deemed to "retain remarkable integrity" and to be significant as the oldest brick house in Draper, and as an "excellent example of pioneer craftsmanship".

There is another brick house claimed to be the oldest in Draper: the Burnham House at 12735 S. Fort Street. It and this Fitzgerald house were both "built in the mid to late 1860s, and claim to be the oldest brick homes in Draper. Both have adobe-lined walls."

== See also ==
- National Register of Historic Places listings in Salt Lake County, Utah
