= Brady-Brady House =

- U.S. National Register of Historic Places
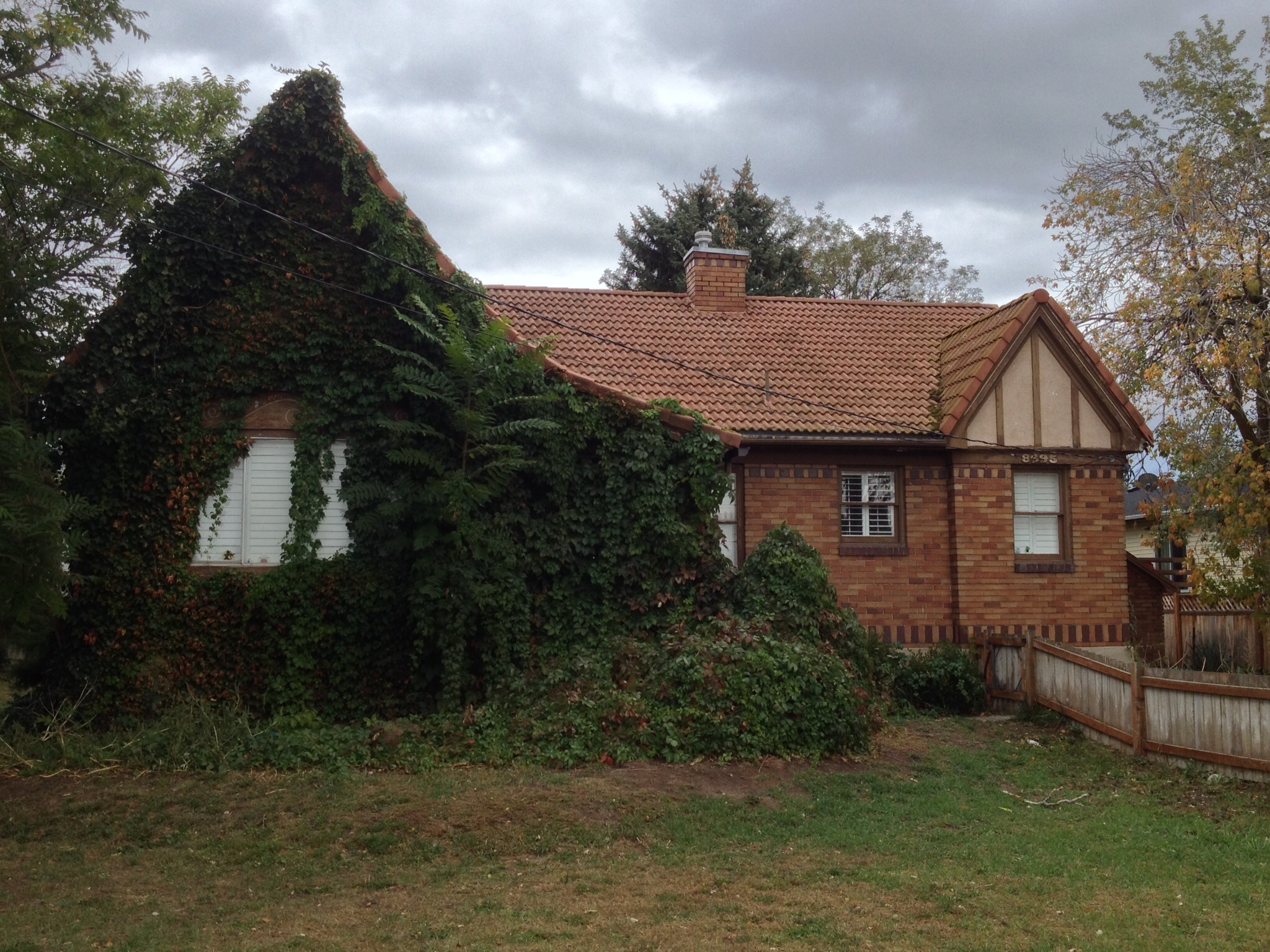

- Location within Utah Location within the United States
- Location: 8395 South 1000 East, Sandy, Utah
- Coordinates: 40°35′56″N 111°51′42″W
- Area: less than one acre
- Built: 1930
- Architectural style: Tudor Revival
- MPS: Sandy City MPS
- NRHP reference No.: 04001419
- Added to NRHP: December 30, 2004

The Brady-Brady House, at 8395 South 1000 East in Sandy, Utah, was built in 1930. It was listed on the National Register of Historic Places in 2004. The listing included two contributing buildings.

It is a Tudor Revival-style house. It is 26 by 40 feet (7.9 m × 12.2 m) in plan, and has aprojecting cross-gabled bay which is 14 feet (4.3 m) wide and 8 feet (2.4 m) deep.
