= Henry Grow =

American architect

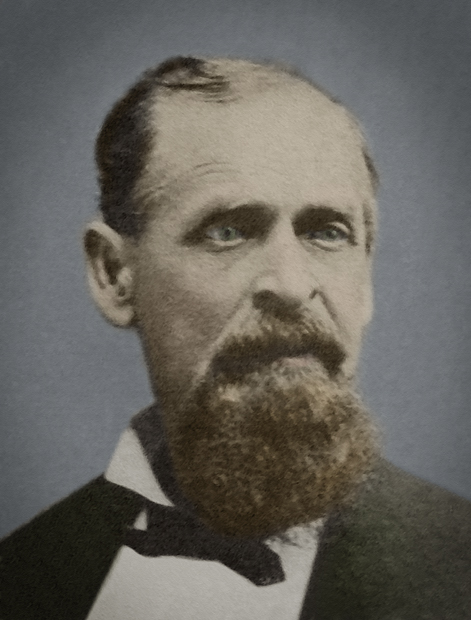
Henry Grow

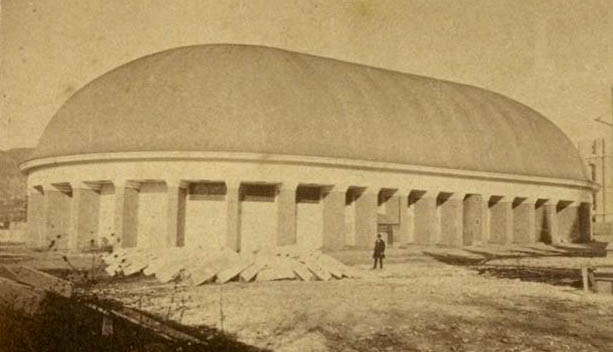
The Tabernacle in the 1870s

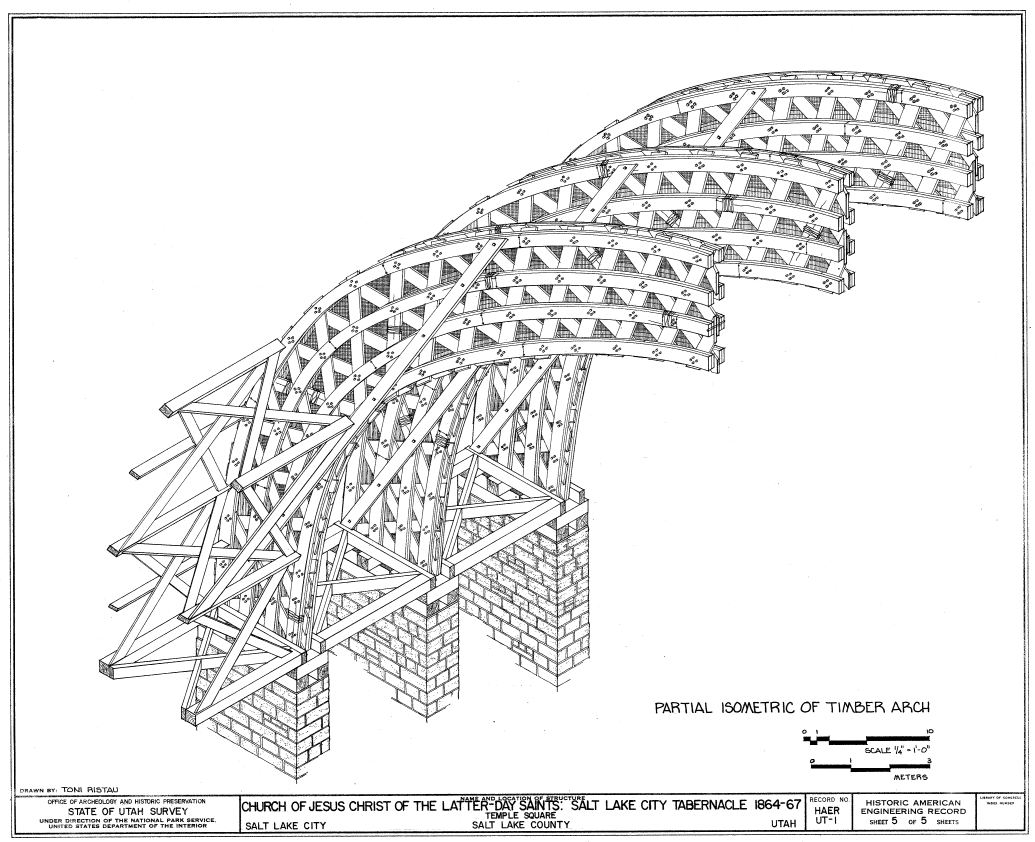
Grow's design is particularly remarkable because he built the roof with almost no nails, which were scarce in pioneer Utah

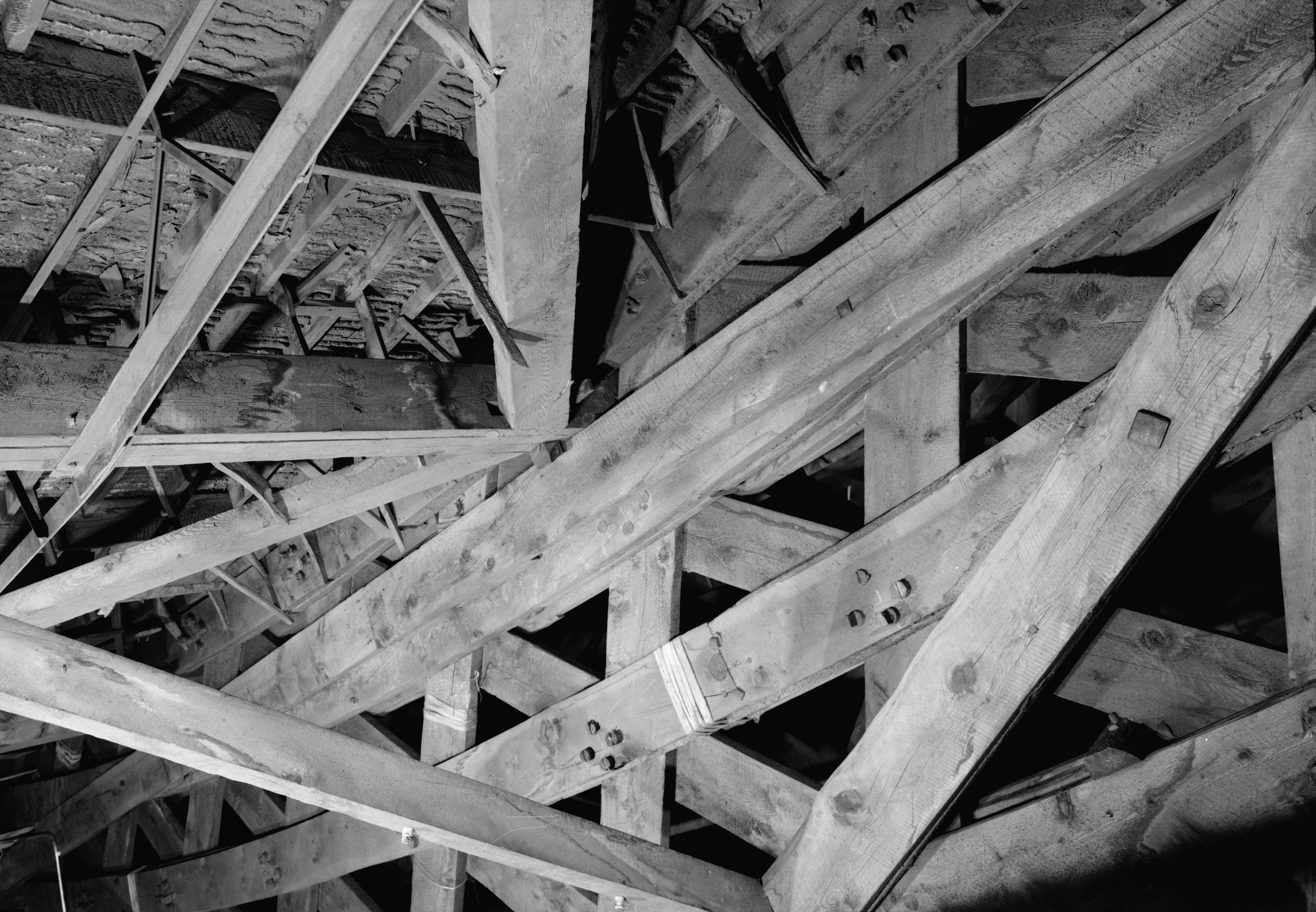
Trusses were bound with wood blocks and rawhide

Henry Grow, Jr. (October 1, 1817 – November 4, 1891) was a Latter-day Saint (Mormon) builder and civil engineer in pioneer-era Utah. His most notable achievement was aiding the construction of the Salt Lake Tabernacle on Temple Square in Salt Lake City, Utah. Grow engineered the meeting hall's unique elongated dome roof.

== Biography ==
Grow was the seventh child of Henry Grow and Mary Riter Grow. Born in Lower Merion Township, Pennsylvania, he spent his childhood on his father's sixty acre (240,000 m²) farm. This farm was one of five bequeathed by Grow's German grandfather, Frederick Grow, to each of his children.

In his early adulthood, Grow was apprenticed as a carpenter and joiner for the Norristown and Germantown railroads. He eventually superintended the construction of all bridges under George G. Whitmore, president of the railroads and ex-mayor of Philadelphia.

In May 1842, Grow was baptized into the Church of Jesus Christ of Latter Day Saints; he traveled to church headquarters in Nauvoo, Illinois, in 1843. Grow worked on the Nauvoo Temple until its completion in May 1846. By that time, church leader Joseph Smith had long been assassinated by a mob, and the church had schismed as Mormons were being driven from Nauvoo.

Following the leadership of Brigham Young, Grow traveled across the Great Plains to Utah in 1851 as part of the James Cummings Company. He arrived in Salt Lake Valley on October 1, 1851, his 34th birthday.

Grow settled north of present-day Ogden, Utah, but was called to Salt Lake City by Young in 1852 to oversee construction projects for Utah Territory and for the Church of Jesus Christ of Latter-day Saints (LDS Church). In 1853, Grow designed and built the first suspension bridge in Utah, over the Weber River. He was also superintendent for the construction of the original Sugar House sugar beet mill under the direction of Bishop Fred Kesler. From 1854 to 1861, Grow built or rebuilt at least five sawmills, mostly in Big Cottonwood Canyon. He also worked on a cotton mill and built more bridges, over the Provo and Jordan Rivers. The Jordan River Bridge, finished in 1861, employed the patented Remington bridge lattice similar to other bridges he helped construct in Pennsylvania.

From 1876 to 1877, Grow served a mission for the church in Maryland, Delaware, and Pennsylvania, where he was able to visit old relatives. Upon his return to Salt Lake City, he was assigned to tear down the so-called "old Tabernacle" that stood on Temple Square and superintended the construction of the Salt Lake Assembly Hall under Obed Taylor. Grow built several residences, including a house for church president John Taylor, and acted as superintendent of carpentry of the church through the 1880s. Grow's last important project was the construction of the Deseret Paper Mill for the LDS Church-owned Deseret News newspaper.

=== Salt Lake Tabernacle ===
In the early 1860s, Young tapped Grow for what became Grow's largest and most famous construction, the dome of the Salt Lake Tabernacle. Young had become infatuated with the idea of constructing the Tabernacle in an elongated dome shape. When asked how large a roof he could construct using a Remington bridge-style lattice, Grow replied that it could be "100 feet wide and as long as is wanted." Grow engineered the tabernacle roof to be 150 feet (46 m) across and 250 feet (76 m) long.

Construction of the Tabernacle began on July 26, 1864, but construction of the roof did not begin until 1865 when all 44 supporting sandstone piers designed by William H. Folsom were in place. Grow rapidly built the roof structure from the center out, but encountered difficulty engineering the semicircular ends of the roof. This difficulty dragged structural work on the roof into fall of 1866 even as other parts of the roof were being shingled. However, Grow finished and shingled the entire roof by the spring of 1867, before the interior of the building was finished. He continued to superintend the construction of the building until it was finished.

== Personal life ==
A polygamist, Grow had seven wives, of which only four bore children. Chronologically in order of marriage, his wives who had children were Mary Moyer, Ann Elliott, Ann Midgley, and Julia Veach. They bore him seven, eight, one, and seventeen children respectively.

Grow was fined $50 and imprisoned for 5 months on March 20, 1887 for unlawful cohabitation.

Notable descendants of Grow include C. Scott Grow and Marlin K. Jensen, general authorities of the LDS Church. In 2012, Grow and Jensen helped plan a large-scale reunion of more than 3,000 descendants of Henry Grow.

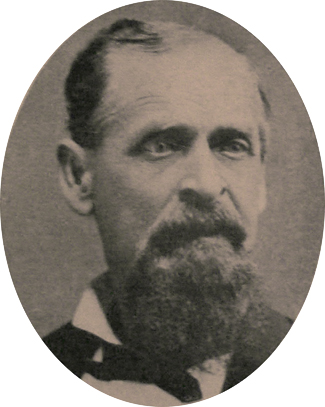
Photo from Pioneers and Prominent Men of Utah (1913).

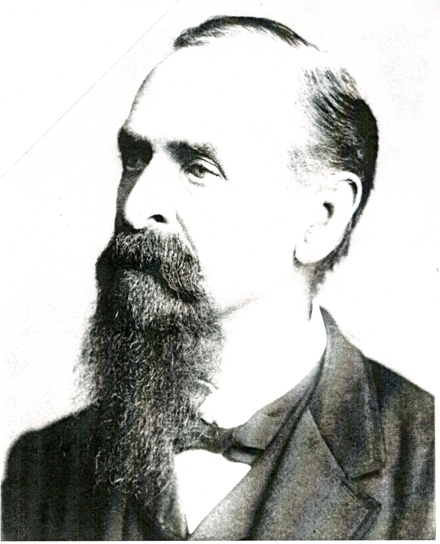
Another image
