= Cottonwood Paper Mill =

- Granite Paper Mill
- U.S. National Register of Historic Places
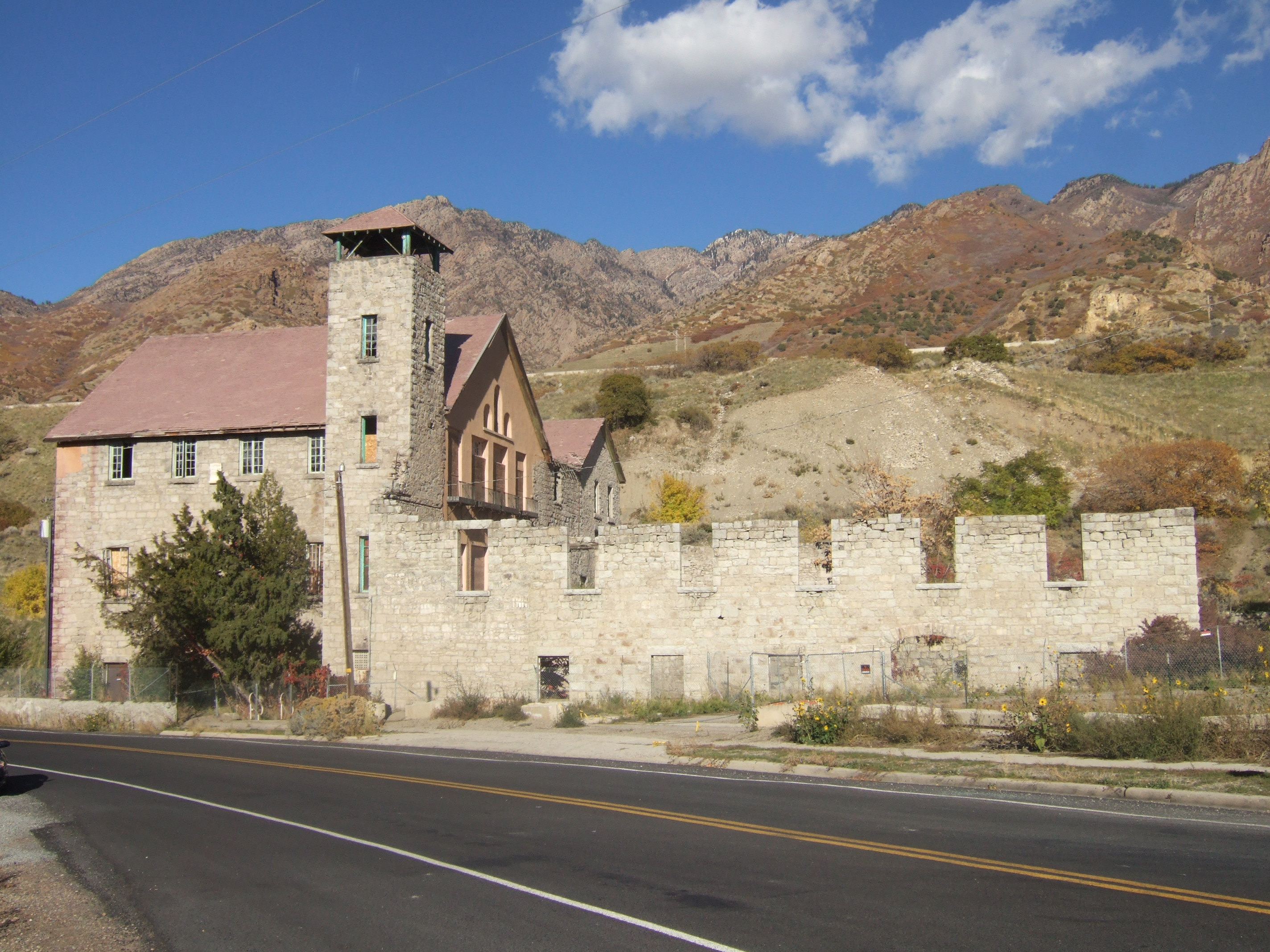

- Location within Utah Location within the United States
- Location: 6900 Big Cottonwood Canyon Rd., Salt Lake City, Utah
- Coordinates: 40°37′37″N 111°47′57″W
- Area: 2 acres (0.81 ha)
- Built: 1880
- Built by: Grow, Henry
- NRHP reference No.: 71000848
- Added to NRHP: April 16, 1971

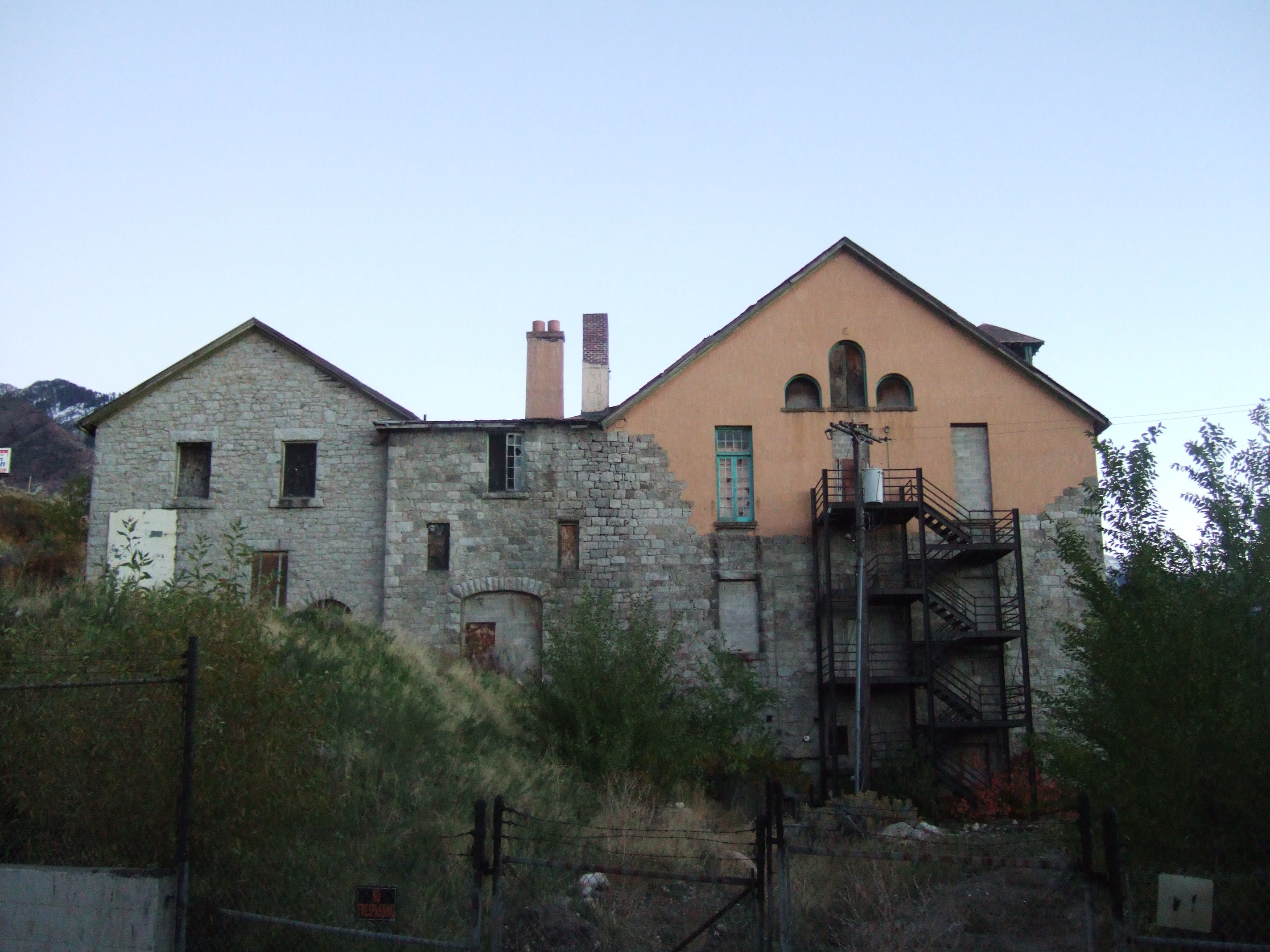
Photo of the back of the Mill

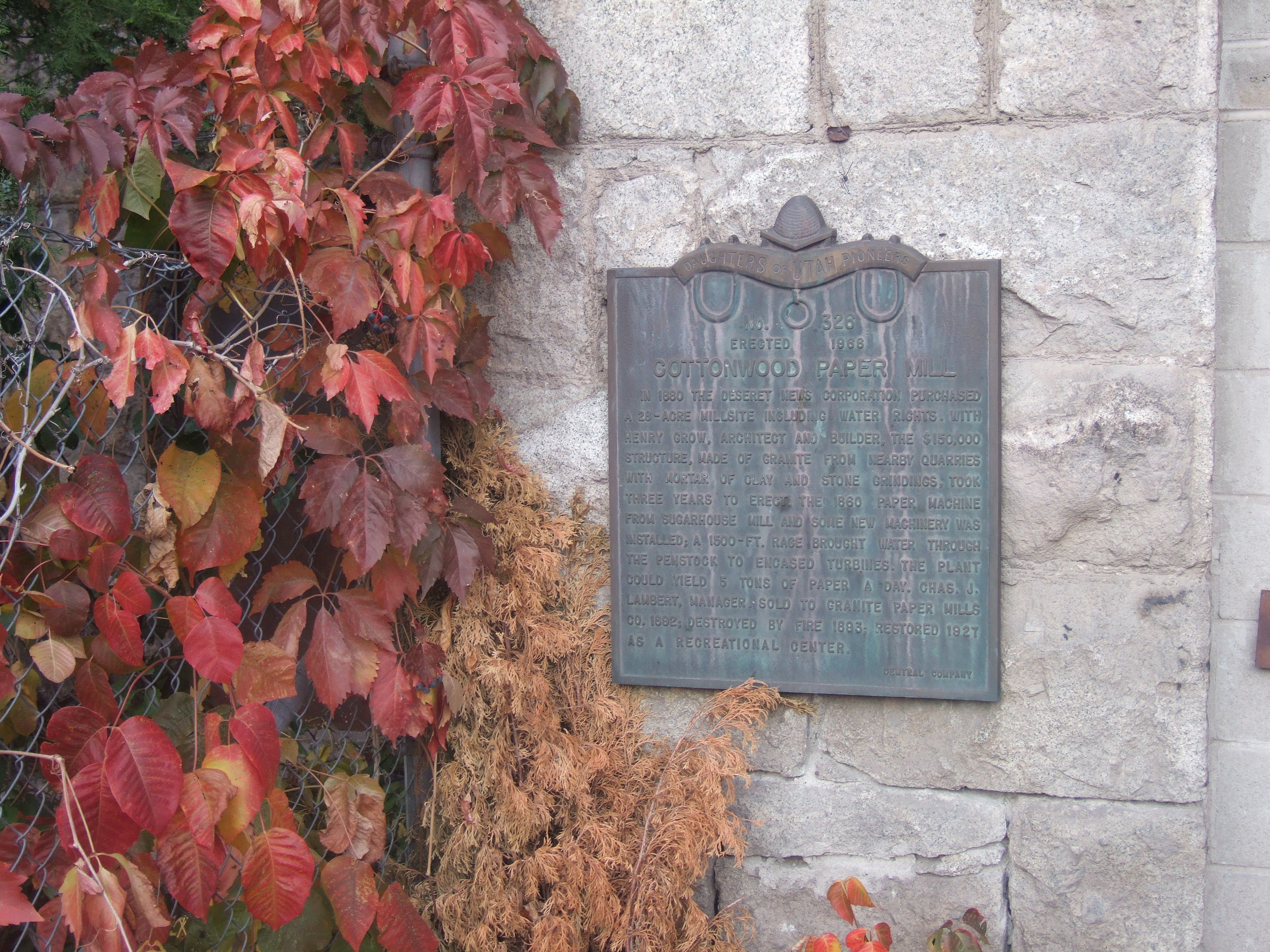
Daughters of the Utah Pioneers Plaque, located at the base of the Mill's tower

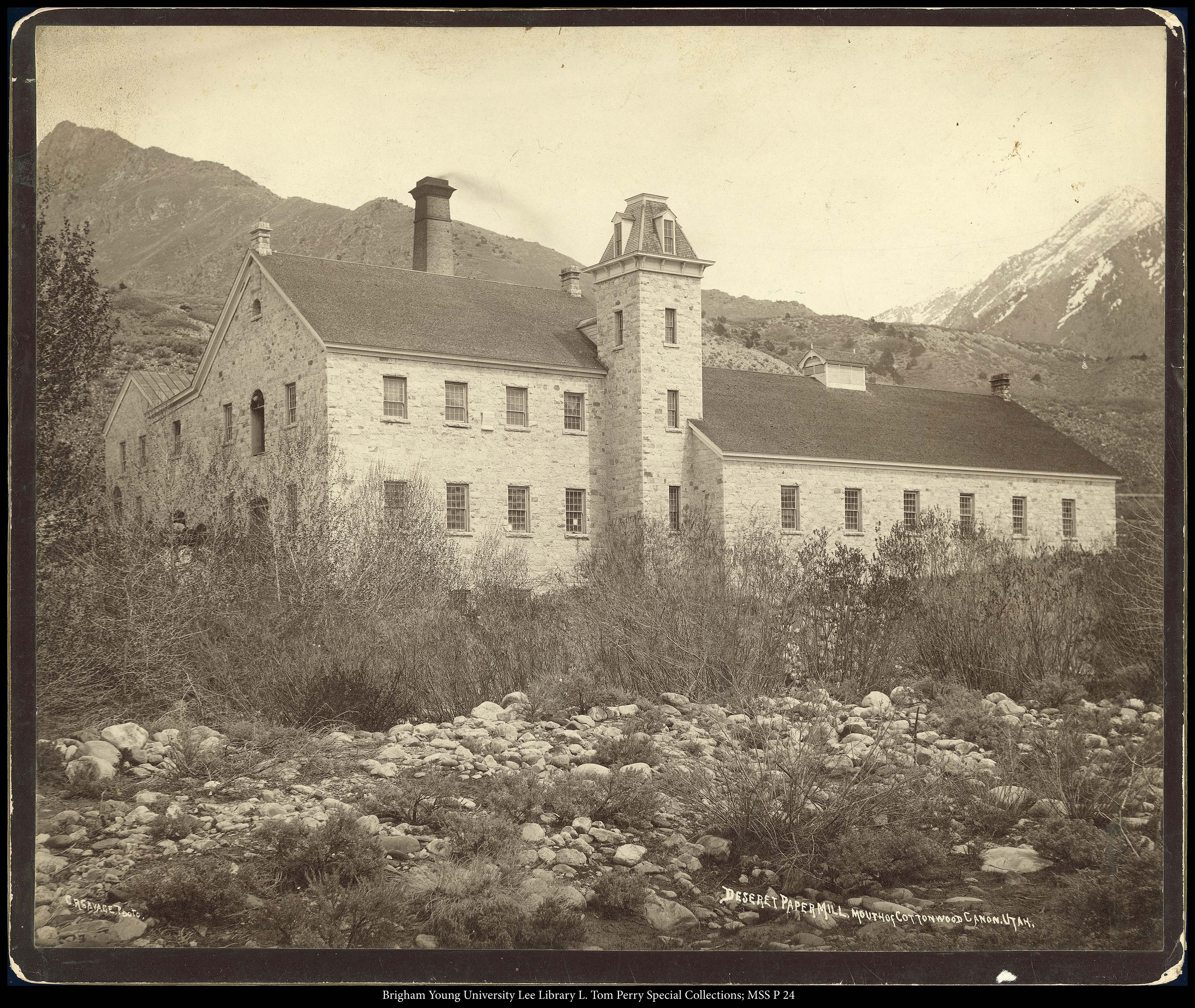
Deseret Paper Mill around 1869

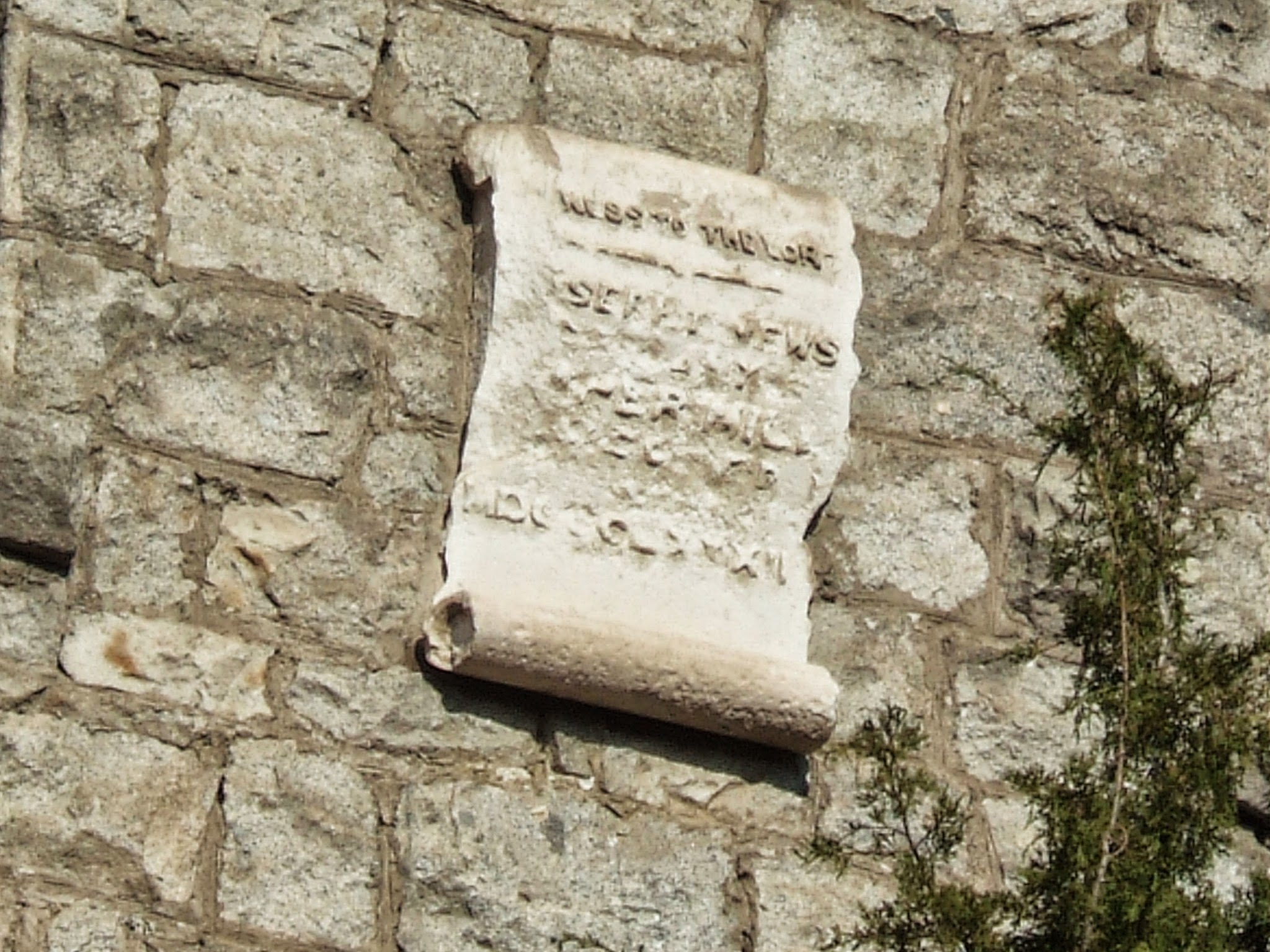
Close-up of the scroll on the front of the building

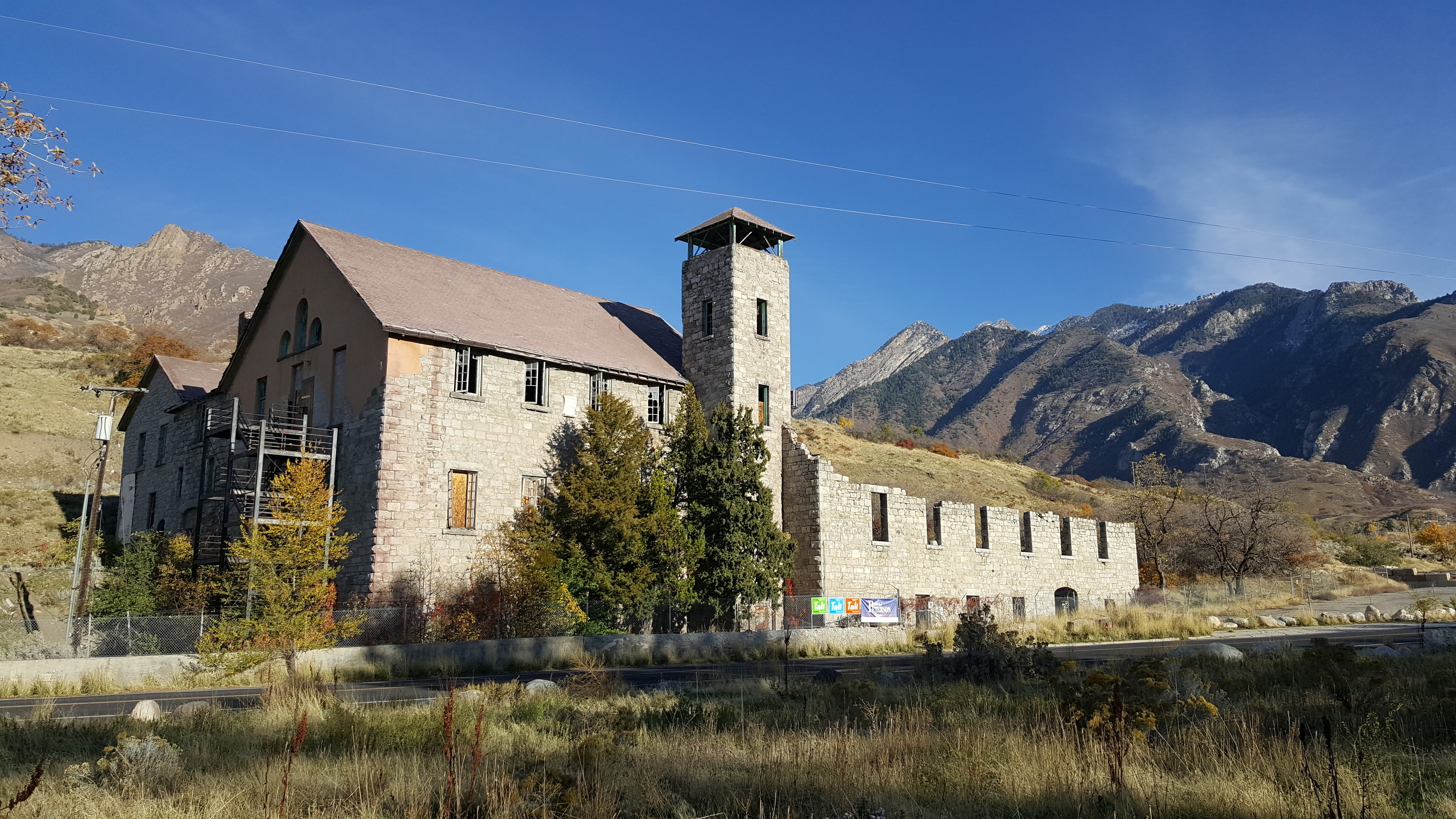
The Old Mill in October 2017

The Cottonwood Paper Mill (also known as Granite Paper Mill) is an abandoned stone structure located at the mouth of Big Cottonwood Canyon in Cottonwood Heights, Utah. It was listed on the National Register of Historic Places in 1971.

It was built in 1883 by the Deseret News under the direction of Henry Grow. Workers used paper making equipment brought in from the old Sugar House Mill to grind logs from nearby canyons into pulp. Rags gathered from old clothes were also used to produce the pulp, which was then placed into molds and dried. During its operation, the mill could yield up to 5 tons of paper per day.

The mill provided jobs and paper for nearly ten years; the railroad increased the demand for cheaper paper manufactured outside the area. In 1892, the Cottonwood Paper Mill was sold to Granite Paper Mills Company. On April 1, 1893, a fire broke out among its indoor stored stockpile of paper. Many hearing the alarm thought it an April Fools' Day prank. All that remained following the fire was a stone skeleton.

The structure was partially rebuilt in 1927 for use as an open-air dance hall, known as the Old Mill Club, and remained so until the 1940s. In the late 1960s, rock bands played there on Friday and Saturday nights. It was also used in the 1970s and 1980s as a haunted house and a craft boutique. It was declared a historic site by the Daughters of Utah Pioneers in 1966, and was condemned by the city of Cottonwood Heights in 2005.

== See also ==
- National Register of Historic Places listings in Salt Lake County, Utah
