= White Community Memorial Chapel =

Non-denominational meetinghouse on Capitol Hill in Salt Lake City, Utah, United States

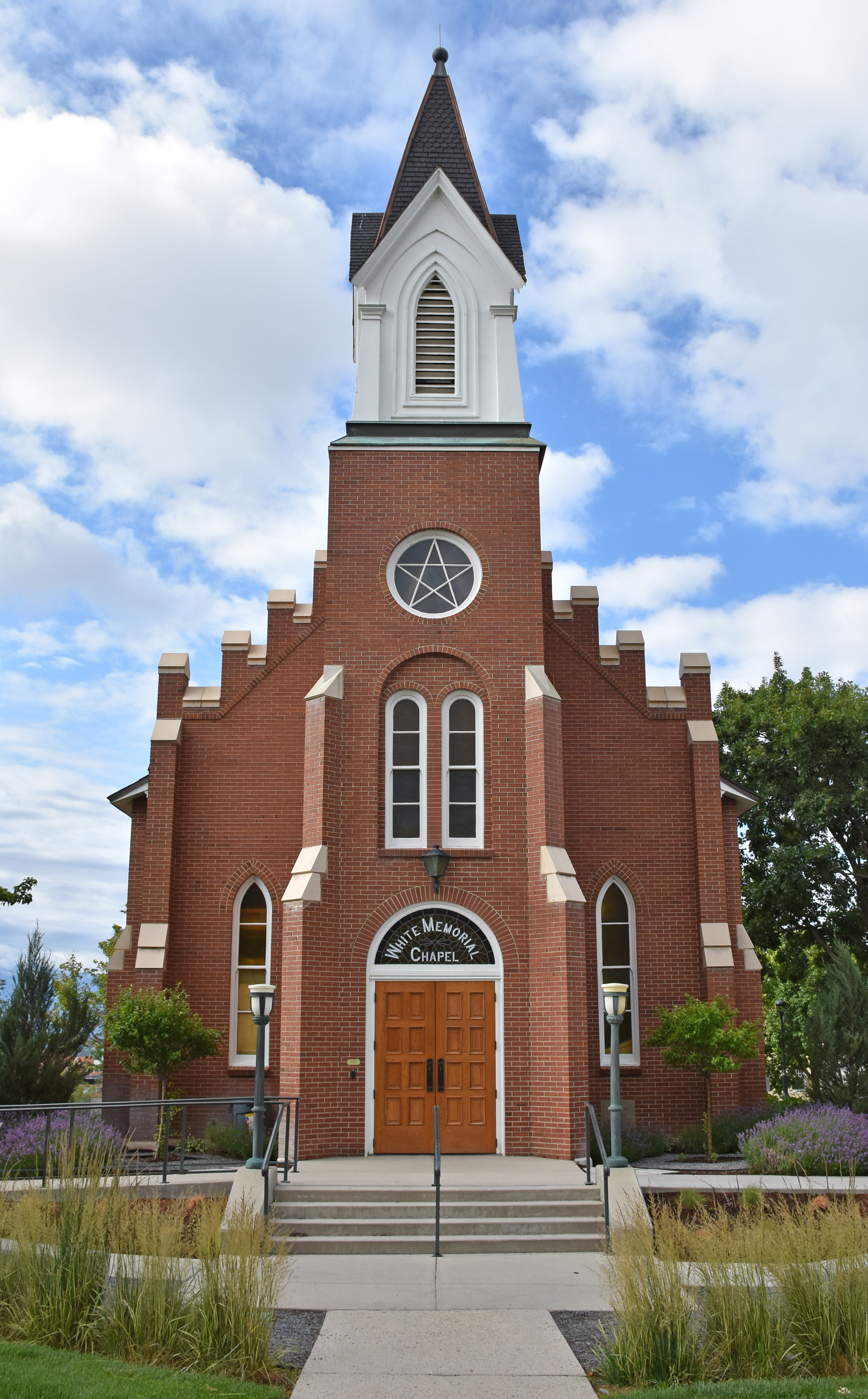
- Interactive map of the White Community; Memorial Chapel area
- Former names: Salt Lake 18th Ward meetinghouse
- Etymology: M. Kenneth White; Ada Marie Sparks White

General information
- Architectural style: semi-Gothic Revival
- Location: 150 East 300 North, Salt Lake City, Utah, United States
- Coordinates: 40°46′32.21″N 111°53′12.65″W
- Years built: 1880–1882 (original); 1979–1980 (replica)
- Groundbreaking: June 12, 1880 (original); April 23, 1979 (replica)
- Inaugurated: January 14, 1883 (original); June 27, 1980 (replica)

Design and construction
- Architects: Obed Taylor (original); Steven T. Baird (replica)

Website
- utahstatecapitol.utah.gov/capitol-event-spaces/white-chapel/

White Community Memorial Chapel is a historic, non-denominational meetinghouse on Capitol Hill in Salt Lake City, Utah. The structure was built from 1979 to 1980 with salvaged elements from the recently demolished Salt Lake 18th Ward meetinghouse, which had been constructed in the early 1880s. The reconstruction was largely funded by the Mahonri Kenneth White and Ada Marie Sparks White Foundation, and the completed meetinghouse was donated to the State of Utah, which administers it as part of the Utah State Capitol complex.

== History ==
=== Original 18th Ward meetinghouse ===
The first European-American settlers arrived in what would become Salt Lake City during July 1847. These settlers were Mormon pioneers (members of the Church of Jesus Christ of Latter-day Saints, commonly referred to as the LDS Church), whose congregations were organized in groups called wards. The 18th Ward of was one of the original nineteen wards of Salt Lake City, having been created in February 1849. Initially, the ward was made up of the families of church leaders such as Brigham Young, Heber C. Kimball and Newel K. Whitney. Early on, the ward held their religious services in various structures, including the schoolhouse on Young's estate.

Construction of a permanent meetinghouse began in 1880 just north of the corner of 2nd Avenue and A Street, in the Salt Lake City's Avenues neighborhood of the city. The first religious services were held in the new building on July 23, 1882. The building was designed by Obed Taylor in a semi-Gothic style. The walls were built of brick, the foundation of granite stone, and the tower's height was 76 feet (23 m). The chapel's cost was about $6,500 (equivalent to $216,853 in 2025).

A dedication ceremony was held January 14, 1883, with Joseph F. Smith giving the dedication prayer and President John Taylor providing a discourse. The following year, a schoolhouse was built next to the chapel. In 1907, the schoolhouse was replaced by the meetinghouse's connected annex, which included an amusement hall. The annex, officially called "Whitney Hall" after the ward's longtime bishop, Orson F. Whitney, was opened in summer 1908.

=== Reconstruction ===
The LDS Church began constructing a new building that would replace the aging 18th Ward chapel in 1972. The location of the old building would become a parking lot for the new structure, and the original chapel would need to be moved or demolished. The Division of State History attempted to save the building onsite by asking the Utah Attorney General, Vernon B. Romney, to investigate the trust set up by Don Carlos Young in 1880 when the property was provided to the ward. The trust required the land be used forever as a meeting place, but Romney determined that the members of the ward, and not the state, were the only ones that could bring a lawsuit over the matter.

While construction moved forward on the new building, there were a number of discussions in the community in regards to how the old chapel could be saved. The church offered the building to Pioneer Trail State Park (currently This Is the Place Heritage Park), but the structure did not fit within the time period of its Old Deseret Village, and the church announced in June 1973 that the chapel would be demolished. Cornerstone, (Note: Cornerstone had been organized in 1971, following the destruction of the historic Summit Stake Tabernacle.) an organization dedicated to preserving historic Mormon buildings, raised enough funds to have some of the building's elements removed before the chapel was torn down. In June 1973, the meetinghouse was demolished. Its steeple, windows, doors, benches and other reusable items were removed with the hope to include them in a rebuilt version of the chapel, to possibly be built in nearby Memory Grove.

In 1975, Utah state legislature approved plans to reconstruct the chapel near the State Capitol, and construction began in 1979 with a groundbreaking, officiated by Governor Scott M. Matheson. The chapel's original pulpit was used during the ceremony and the future outline of the structure was painted on the asphalt, with seats for guests arranged as they would be in the completed building. The majority of the reconstruction would be funded by the Mahonri Kenneth White and Ada Marie Sparks White Foundation, supplemented with funds from the Community Memorial Chapel Foundation, with local architect Steven T. Baird in charge. A cornerstone ceremony, performed by the Free and Accepted Masons of Utah, was held October 5, 1979. A box discovered in the original building's cornerstone was reused and new documents added to it, before it was placed in the cornerstone of the replica.

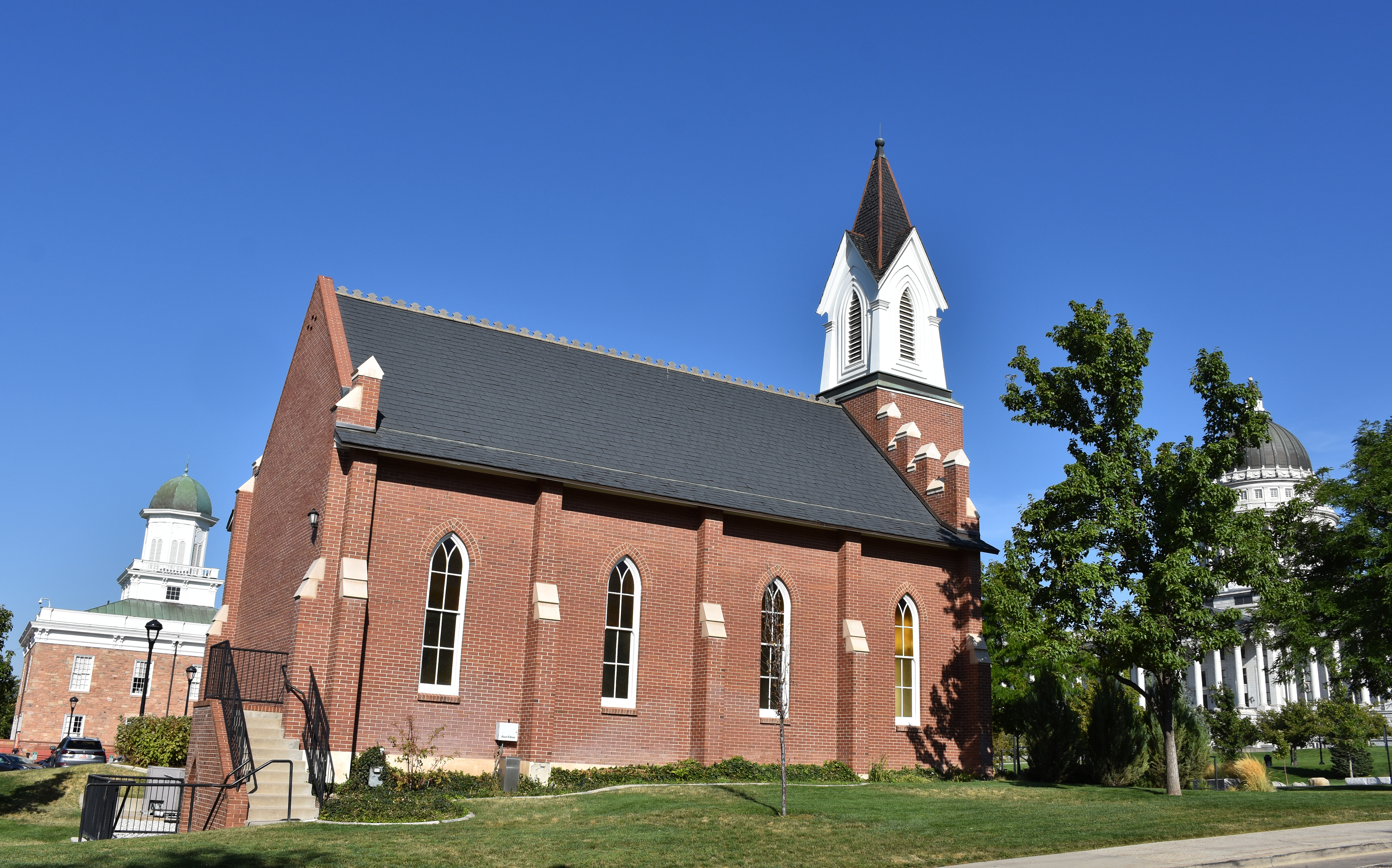
The reconstructed chapel, with the Council Hall and dome of the Utah State Capitol also visible

The completed building was dedicated on June 27, 1980, in a ceremony attended by local civil and religious leaders. The dedicatory prayer was given by Royden G. Derrick and G. Homer Durham delivered the address. The steeple, chapel doors, Gothic windows, wooden pulpit, and benches all came from the original building. A reed organ from an old church in nearby West Jordan, Utah was installed in the chapel. At the building's opening, the Honors Library of Living History was hosted in the basement level. The library consisted of a collection of biographical information on prominent Utahns. It also included two reproductions of murals that were on either side of Barratt Hall of the former LDS High School. The tower includes a bell, purchased by the Whites, which was first rung on Easter day, 1980.
