= Salt Lake Assembly Hall =

Historic building in Salt Lake City, Utah, United States

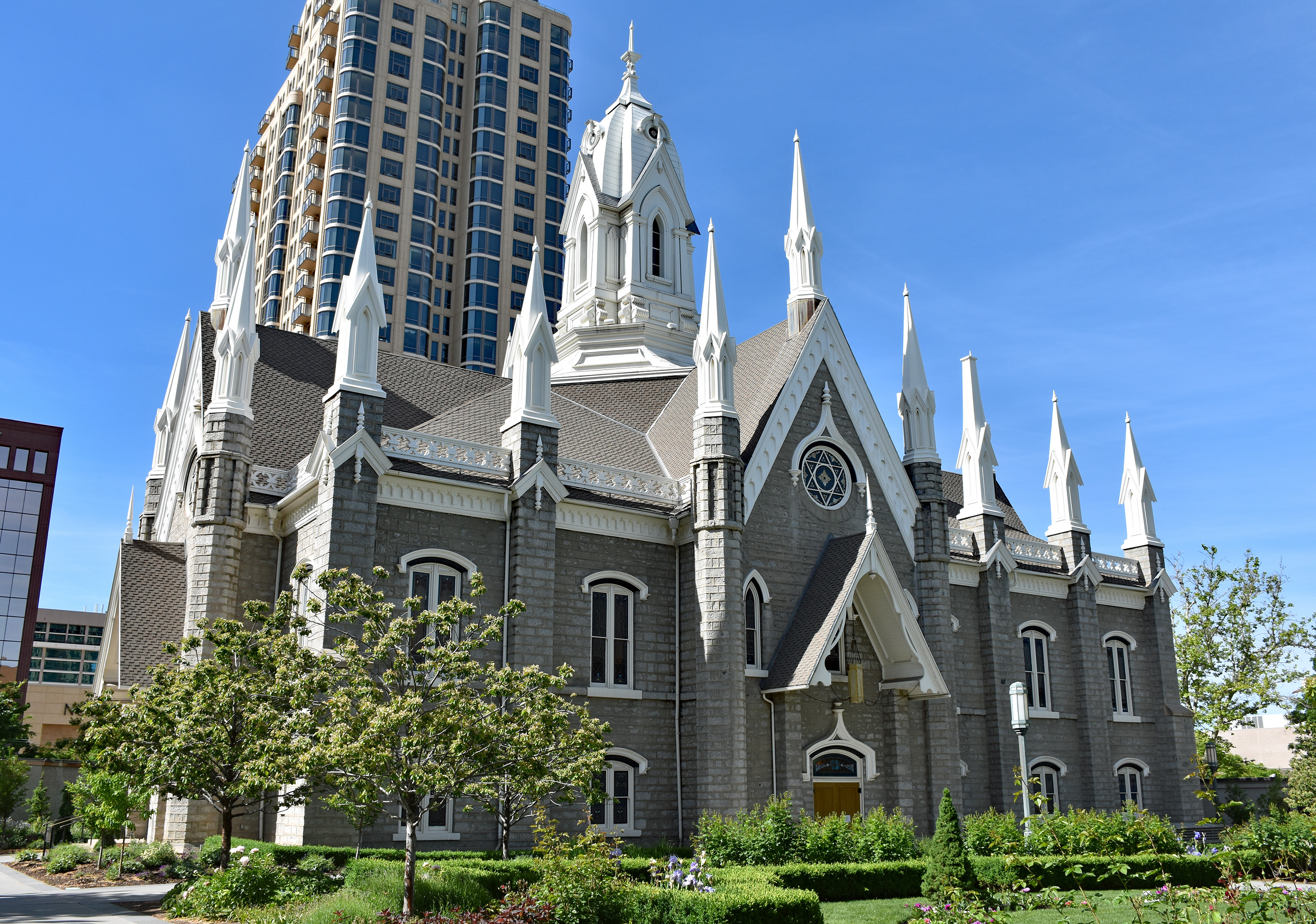

Religion
- Affiliation: The Church of Jesus Christ of Latter-day Saints

Location
- Location: Salt Lake City, Utah; United States
- Interactive map of Salt Lake Assembly Hall
- Coordinates: 40.7697°N 111.8932°W

Architecture
- Architect: Obed Taylor
- Style: Victorian Gothic style
- Groundbreaking: 1877
- Completed: 1882
- Materials: (Exterior) Quartz monzonite

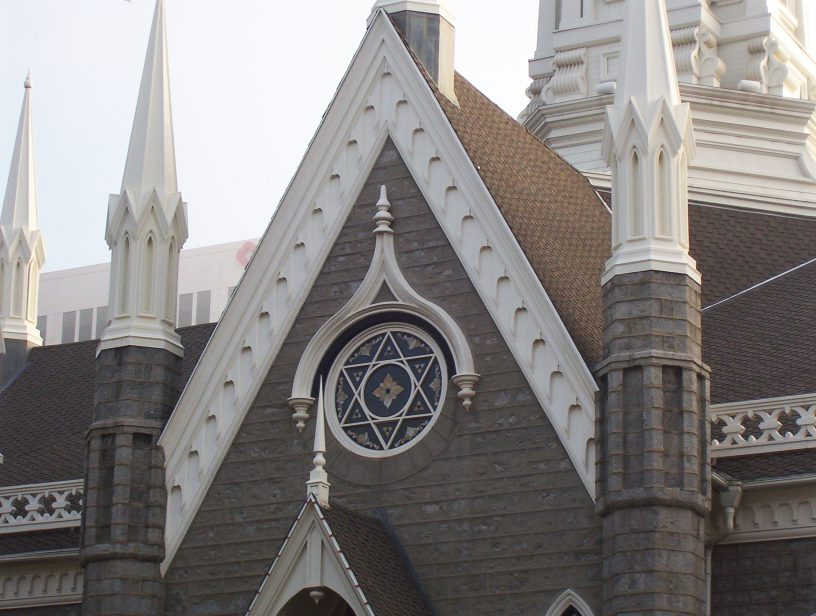
Detail showing Star of David

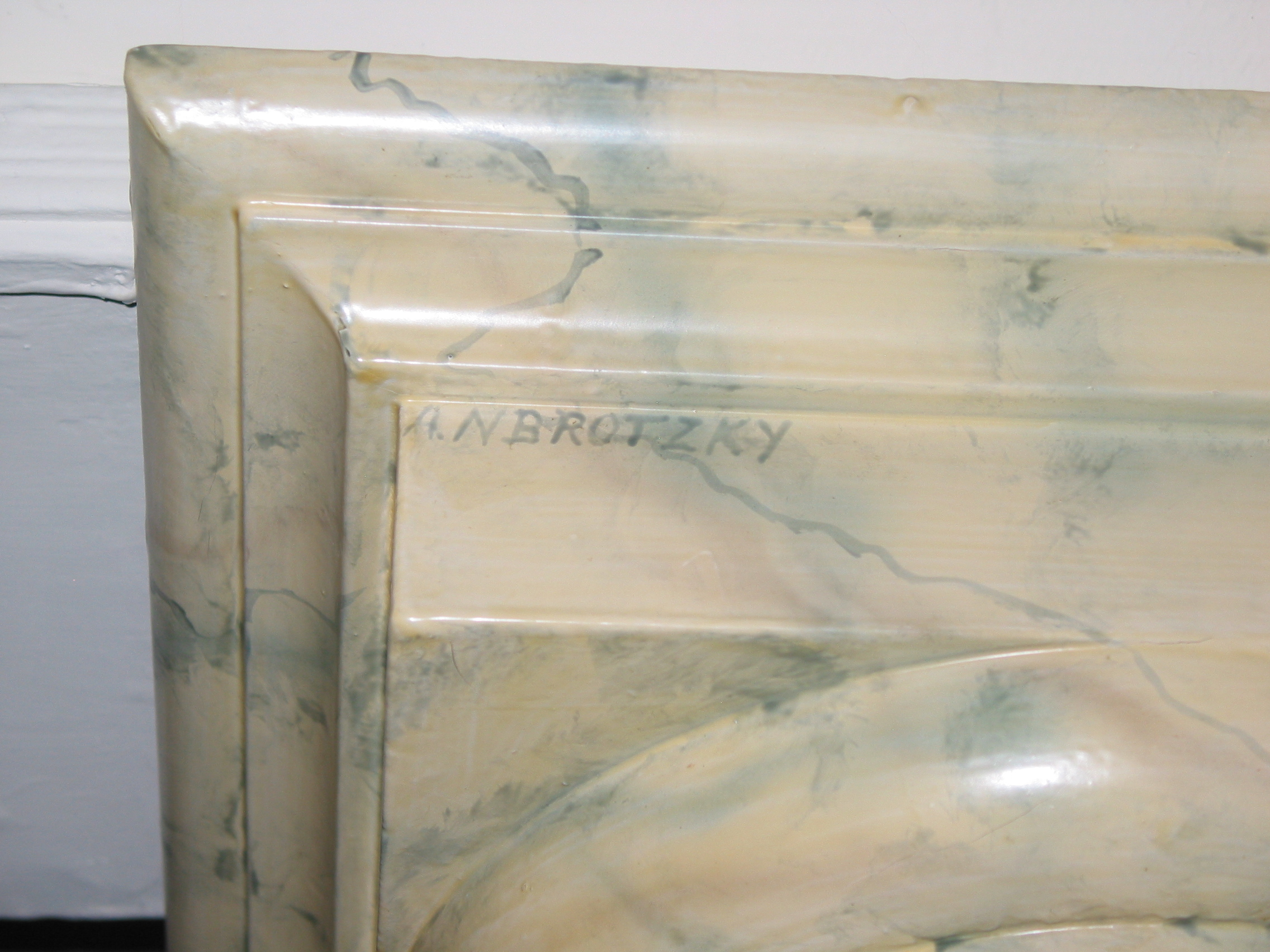
Detail showing marbleizing on balcony support pillar

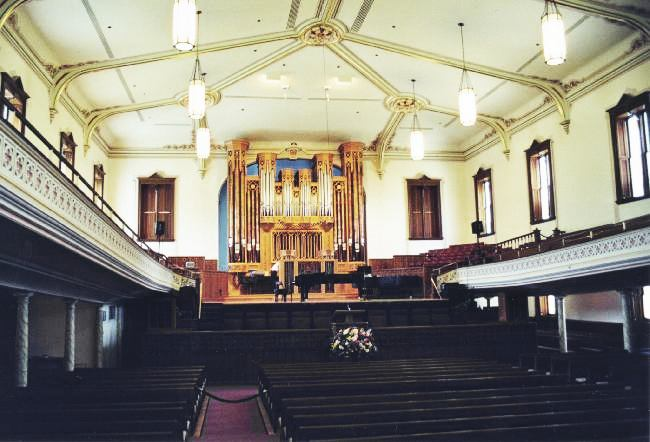
Inside Assembly Hall

The Salt Lake Assembly Hall is a building owned by the Church of Jesus Christ of Latter-day Saints (LDS Church) which sits on the southwest corner of Temple Square in Salt Lake City, Utah. It has seating capacity for an audience of approximately 1,400 people.

== Design ==
The Assembly Hall is a Victorian Gothic congregation hall. Rough granite walls are laid out in cruciform style making the hall's exterior look like a small gothic cathedral. Twenty-four spires mark the perimeter of the building's footprint and a tower rises from the intersection of the floor plan's apparent crucifix. The cruciform layout is complemented by Stars of David circumscribed high above each entrance. These symbolize an LDS perception that they are a re-gathering of Biblical Tribes of Israel.

However, the deceptively Gothic exterior conceals a more modern interior lacking vaulted ceilings.

Although built of quartz monzonite rock from the same quarry as the Salt Lake Temple, the Assembly Hall's unhewn exterior looks much different. The stones for the Assembly Hall were not cut as exactingly as the temple's. This accounts for the building's dark, rough texture and the broader masonry joints between stones.

The Seagull Monument sits directly in front of the building to the east.

== History ==
Construction of the Assembly Hall began on August 11, 1877. Building began on the southwest corner of Temple Square on the site of what was called the "Old Tabernacle," razed earlier that year. The old structure, an adobe building determined by the LDS Church to be inadequate, was built in 1852 and seated 2500. The "Old Tabernacle" is not to be confused with the still-extant Salt Lake Tabernacle, built in 1867. The domed Tabernacle sits directly north of the Assembly Hall.

During the first two years of construction, the Assembly Hall was confusingly called the "new tabernacle." John Taylor, then president of the church, cleared up the confusion by naming it the "Salt Lake Assembly Hall" in 1879.

Obed Taylor was commissioned as architect, and designed the structure in Victorian Gothic style, which was popular at the time. Using mostly discarded granite stone from the ongoing construction of the Salt Lake Temple, builder Henry Grow completed construction in 1882 at a total cost of $90,000.

After the Tabernacle, the Assembly Hall was the second permanent structure completed on Temple Square. It has been modified several times since completion, however. A four-foot flying-angel weather vane like one that topped the original Nauvoo Temple in Nauvoo, Illinois was removed. Additionally, the original ceiling murals depicting ancient and modern prophets in the LDS Church were painted over.

The most comprehensive renovations occurred from 1979 to 1983 to correct structural weaknesses in the building's tower and roof trusses. While rebuilding the tower, each of the Assembly Hall's 24 spires were replaced with fiberglass moldings. Additionally, all the softwood benches were refinished. Acoustics in the building were enhanced by installing hundreds of small speakers.

Currently, the Assembly Hall hosts occasional free weekend music concerts and is used as overflow for the church's biannual general conferences.

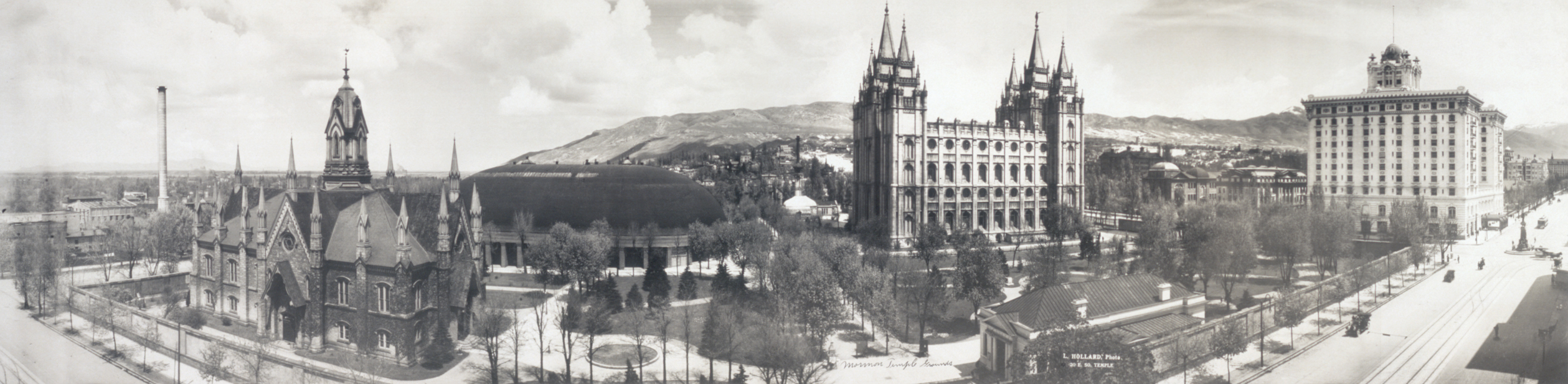
Panorama from South Temple Street taken in 1912

== Organs ==
During the renovations of the 1970-80s, Robert L. Sipe Organbuilders installed a new three-manual, 65-rank, 3,489 pipe organ with a "German accent." The renovations also included creation of rehearsal studios in the building's basement containing three additional organs and a one-manual harpsichord built in 1981 by William Dowd. The southwest practice studio features a three-manual, 12-rank, 727 pipe organ built by the Austin Organ Company of Hartford, Connecticut. The console was built in 1963, while the chests and pipework were redone in 1982 The southeast studio organ was built by the Kenneth Coulter Organ Company of Eugene, Oregon in 1985, the Bach tricentennial year. It was specifically designed to imitate features of German Late Baroque organs and features three manuals, 7 ranks, and 410 pipes. The northeast practice studio organ was built in 1979 by the Casavant Frères organ company of Saint-Hyacinthe, Quebec It is a mechanical action instrument and features interchangeable pedalboards, allowing for the use of either a modern concave design or the older flat European style. It has two manuals, seven ranks, and 452 pipes.
