= Salt Lake Tabernacle =

Building in Salt Lake City, Utah

The Salt Lake Tabernacle
- Mormon Tabernacle
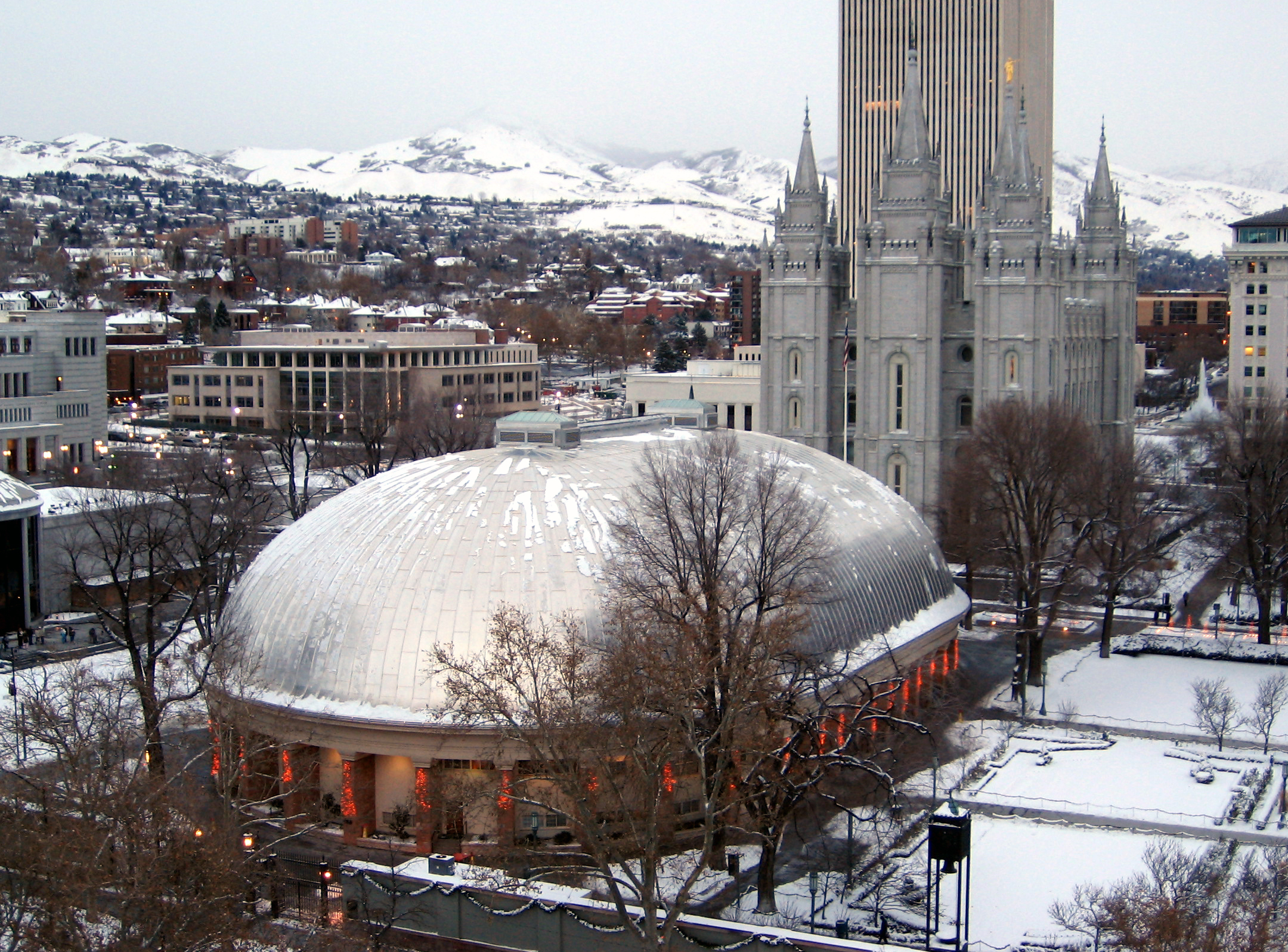
- The exterior of the Tabernacle in December 2008
- Interactive map of The Salt Lake Tabernacle
- Location: 50 W. North Temple; Salt Lake City, Utah
- Coordinates: 40°46′13.5″N 111°53′35.3″W
- Owner: The Church of Jesus Christ of Latter-day Saints
- Seating type: Reserved by Section
- Capacity: 3,500 (after 2007 renovation)
- Type: Auditorium
- Public transit: Temple Square Trax Station

Construction
- Groundbreaking: July 26, 1864
- Opened: October 6, 1867 (First General Conference held); October 9, 1875 (building dedication)
- Architects: Henry Grow; Truman O. Angell (1870 gallery addition) with contributions from William H. Folsom and Brigham Young

Website
- Salt Lake Tabernacle

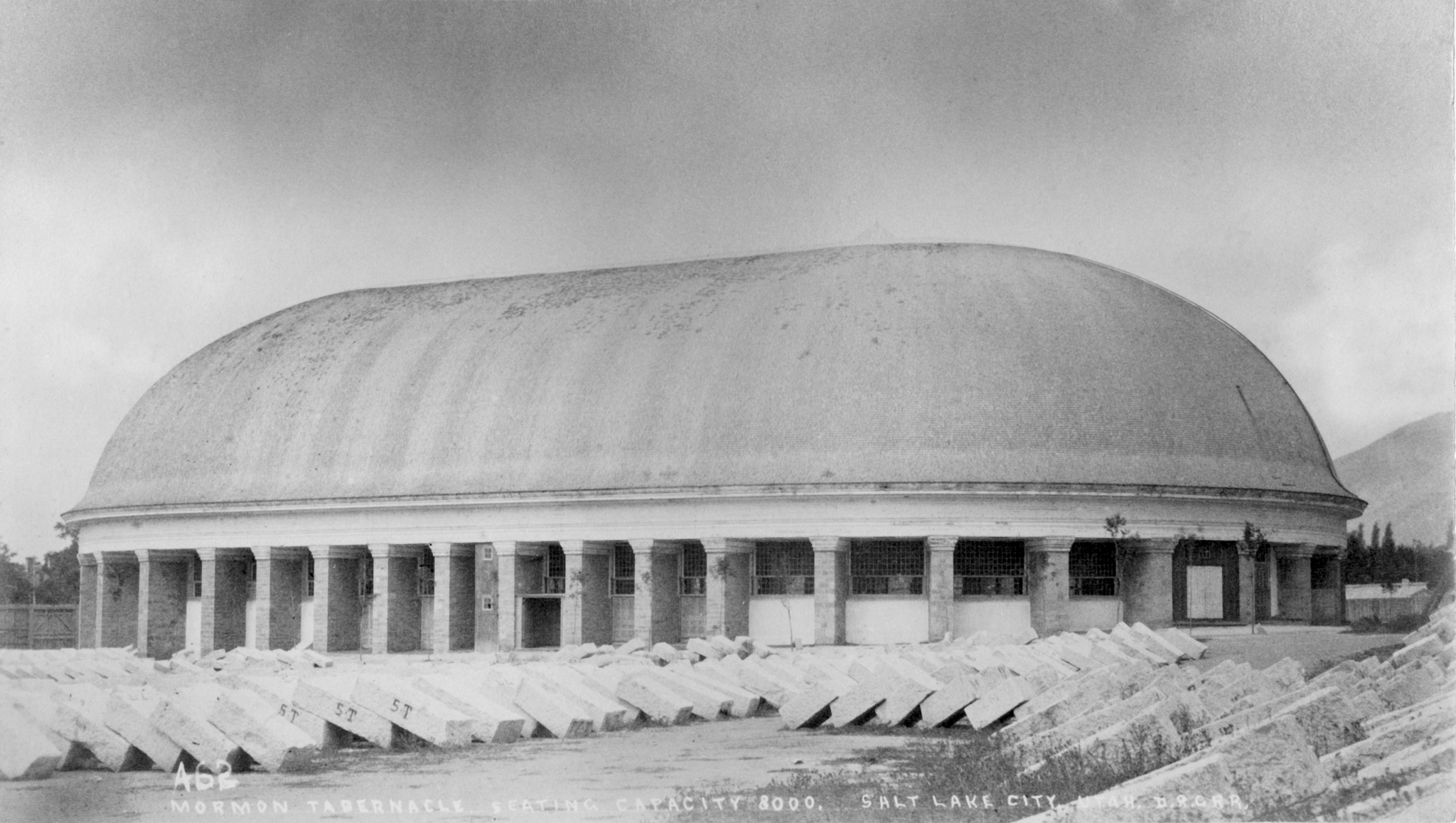
The Salt Lake Tabernacle, taken in the 1870s as part of a series of photos for the Denver & Rio Grande Railroad (established in 1870), showing granite blocks for the construction of the Salt Lake Temple (completed in 1893).

The Salt Lake Tabernacle, formerly known as the Mormon Tabernacle, is located on Temple Square in Salt Lake City, in the U.S. state of Utah. The tabernacle was built from 1863 to 1875 to house meetings for the Church of Jesus Christ of Latter-day Saints (LDS Church). It was the location of the church's semi-annual general conference until the meeting was moved to the new and larger LDS Conference Center in 2000. Now a historic building on Temple Square, the Salt Lake Tabernacle is still used for overflow crowds during general conference. It is known for its acoustics and its pipe organ. The Tabernacle Choir has performed there for over 100 years.

== Background ==
The Salt Lake Tabernacle was inspired by an attempt to build a Canvas Tabernacle in Nauvoo, Illinois, in the 1840s. That tabernacle was to be situated just to the west of the Nauvoo Temple and was to be oval-shaped, much the same as the Salt Lake Tabernacle. However, the Nauvoo edifice (never built) was to have amphitheater-style or terraced seating, and was to have canvas roofing.

== Construction ==
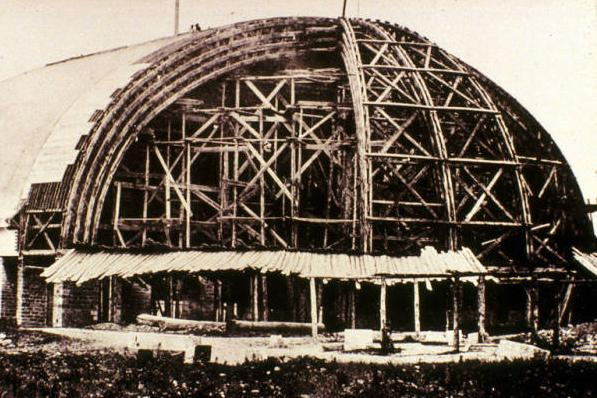
The Tabernacle under construction

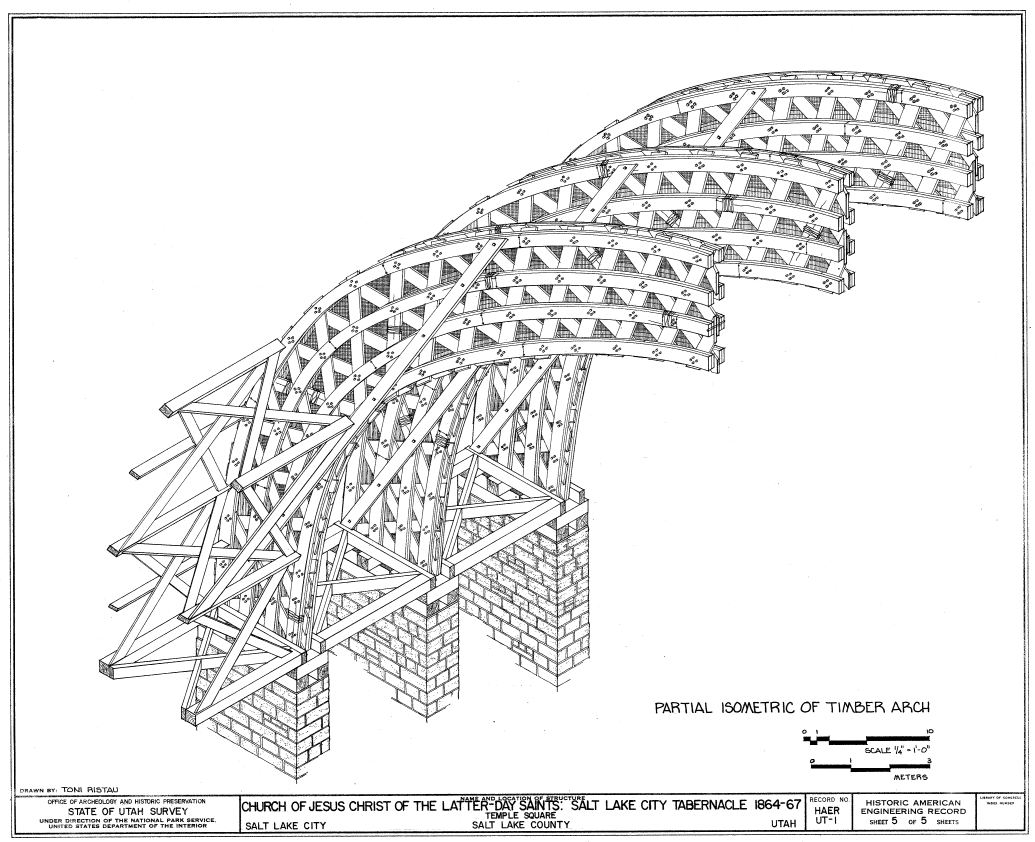
Grow's design built the roof with hardly any nails, which were scarce in pioneer Utah

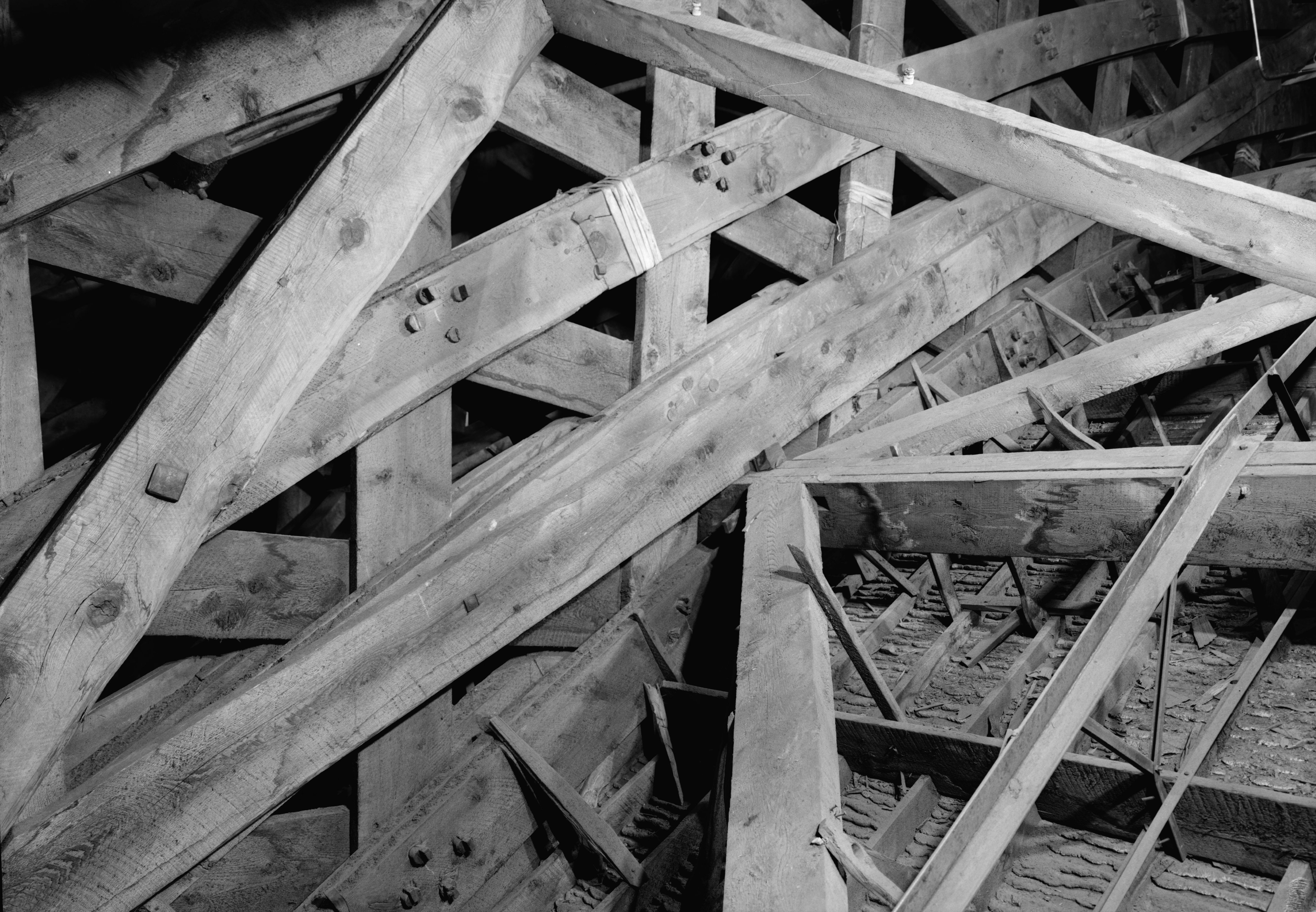
Trusses were bound with wooden pegs and rawhide

The Tabernacle was built between 1864 and 1867 on the west center-line axis of the Salt Lake Temple. In 1892 it was the largest assembly hall in the United States. The roof was constructed in the lattice-truss arch system, which was devised by Ithiel Town and is held together by dowels and wedges. The building has a sandstone foundation, and the dome is supported by forty-four sandstone piers. Prior to its refurbishing in 2007, the overall seating capacity of the building was around 7,000, which included the choir area and gallery (balcony).

Henry Grow, a civil engineer, oversaw the initial construction of the Tabernacle, where the domed roof was the most innovative portion of the building. Brigham Young, church president at the time, wanted the Tabernacle roof constructed in an elongated dome shape with no interior pillars or posts to obstruct the view for the audience (the gallery was added later). When Young asked Grow how large a roof he could construct using the style of lattice that he had used on the Remington bridge, Grow replied that it could be "100 feet wide and as long as is wanted." Eventually, Grow engineered the Tabernacle roof exterior to be 150 feet across, 250 feet long, and 80 feet high. Skeptics insisted that when the interior scaffolding was removed, the whole roof would collapse. The roof structure was nine feet thick, formed by a "Remington lattice truss" of timbers pinned together with wooden pegs. Green rawhide was wrapped around the timbers so that when the rawhide dried it tightened its grip on the pegs. When the roof's structural work was completed, sheeting was applied on the roof, which was then covered with shingles. The interior was lathed and then plastered; the hair of cattle was mixed with the plaster to give it strength.

Construction of the Tabernacle began on July 26, 1864, but construction of the roof did not begin until 1865, when all 44 supporting sandstone piers designed by William H. Folsom were in place. Grow rapidly built the roof structure from the center out, but encountered difficulty engineering the semicircular ends of the roof. This difficulty dragged structural work on the roof into the fall of 1866 even as other parts of the roof were being shingled. However, Grow finished and shingled the entire roof by the spring of 1867, before the interior of the building was finished. The Tabernacle was first used for the October 1867 conference. The roof has lasted for over a century without any structural problems, though the shingles were replaced with aluminum in 1947.

The original benches and columns supporting the balcony were made from the native "white pine" (Engelmann Spruce) that the Mormon pioneers found in the area. Because they wanted to "give their best to the Lord", they hand-painted grain on the benches to look like oak and the pillars to resemble marble. During the renovations completed in 2007, the original benches were replaced with new oak pews, and legroom was increased from nine to 14 inches, causing an overall loss of capacity of 1000 seats.

The Salt Lake Tabernacle organ has its case positioned at the west end above the choir seats, and is the focal point of the Tabernacle's interior. The original organ was made by Joseph H. Ridges in 1867 and contained 700 pipes. The organ has been rebuilt several times with the total pipe count being 11,623, making the Tabernacle organ one of the largest pipe organs in the world. The current organ is the work of G. Donald Harrison of the Aeolian-Skinner organ company, and was completed in 1948. The organ was renovated and restored in 1989 with a few minor changes and additions. The largest 32-foot display pipes in the façade are made of wood and were constructed in the same manner as the balcony columns.

== Architecture ==
The structure was an architectural wonder in its day, prompting a writer for Scientific American to comment on "the mechanical difficulties of attending the construction of so ponderous a roof." In 1882, while on a lecture tour of America, Oscar Wilde noted that the building had the appearance of a soup kettle; he added that it was the most purely dreadful building he ever saw. Some visitors around the beginning of the 20th century criticized it as "a prodigious tortoise that has lost its way" or "the Church of the Holy Turtle," but Frank Lloyd Wright dubbed the tabernacle "one of the architectural masterpieces of the country and perhaps the world."

=== Art and statuary ===
For several years the Tabernacle had various pieces of art on its walls. There was a mural depicting Joseph Smith receiving the Gold plates from an angel. There was also a portrait of Joseph Smith that hung between the organ's largest pipes. In 1875 there was a fountain placed in the middle of the building, "it represented the 'living water' offered by Christ and His gospel." In the same year, a statue of an angel sounding a trumpet was placed between the Organ's two largest pipes. The highest pulpit was lined with Lion statues to represent Brigham Young as the "Lion of the Lord."

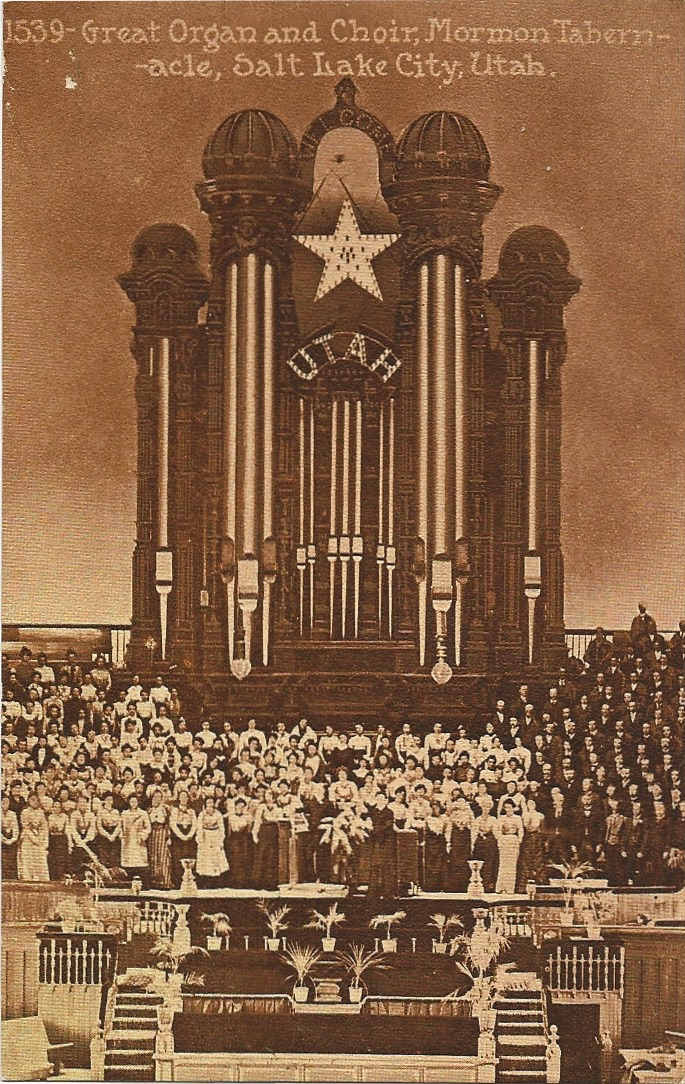
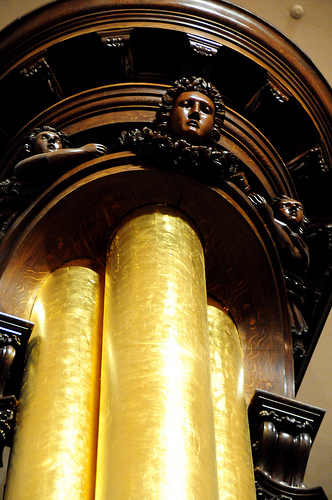
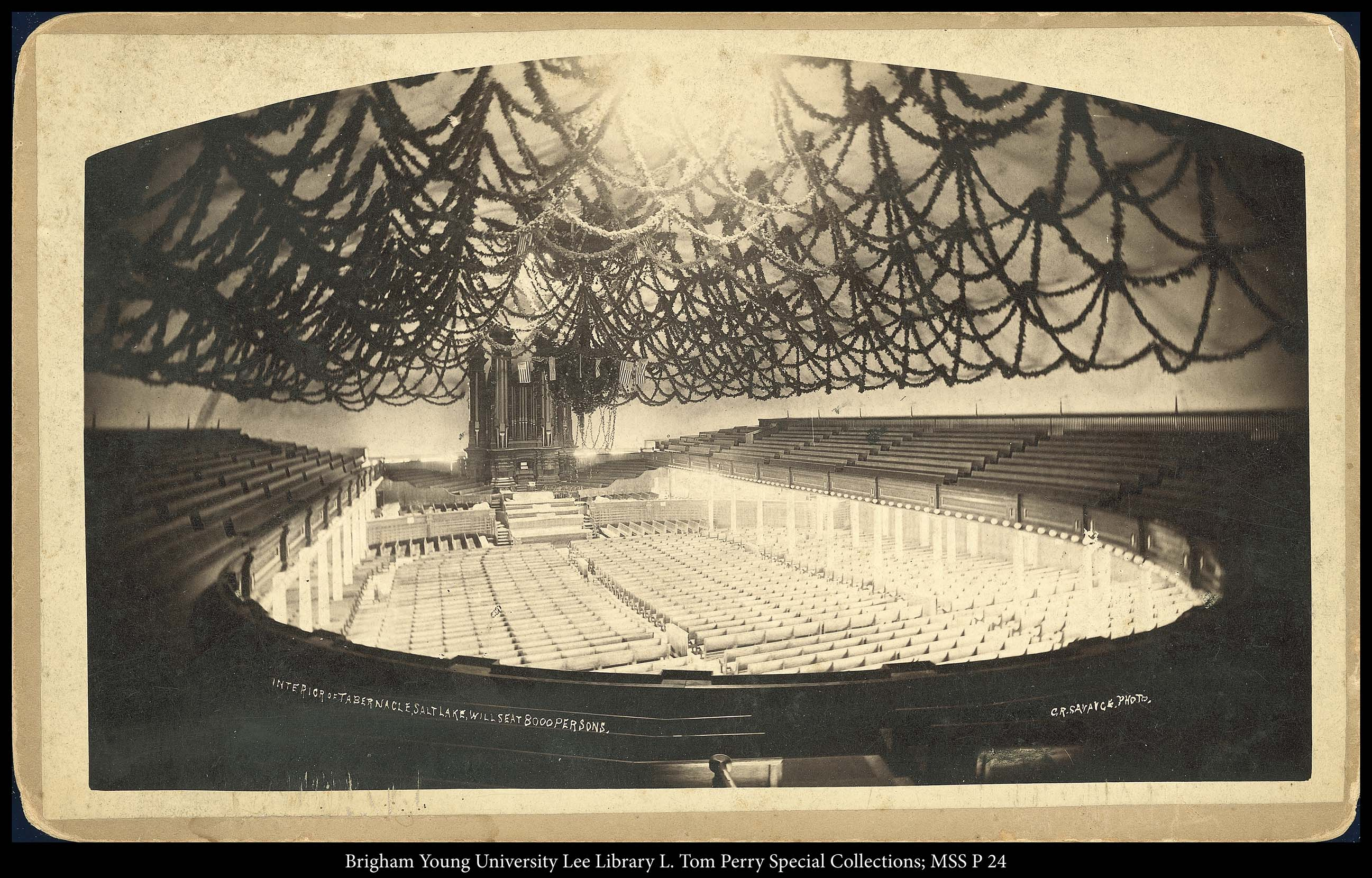
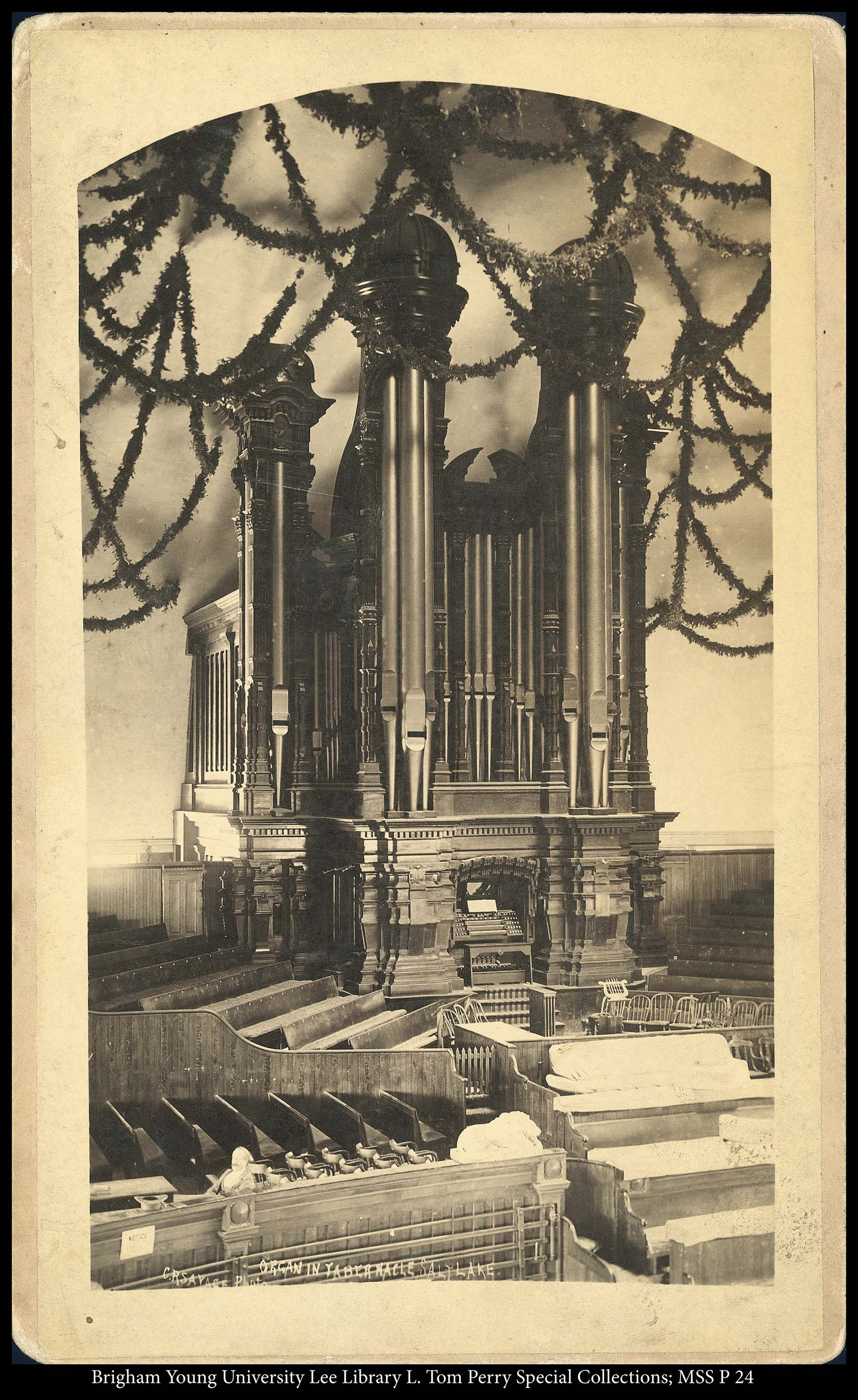
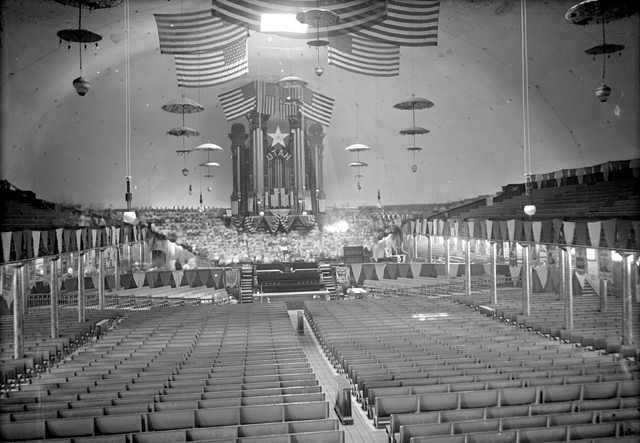
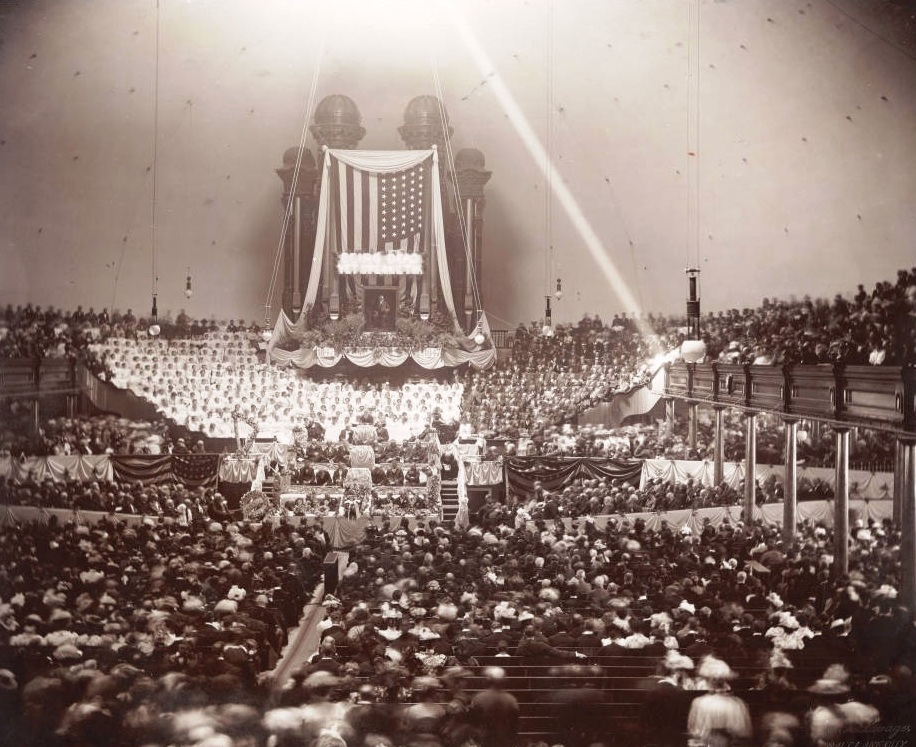
Decorations and art in the Tabernacle.

=== Decorations ===
After its initial construction the structure had little paint so decorations were often used. Some examples include a blue banner with a gold beehive on the rear wall (1875), a star with the word Utah, a banner that read "Under the everlasting covenant God must and shall be glorified," American flags (one of the largest measured 75 ft by 160 ft), bunting, garland, festoons, and flowers. Some people complained because the decorations were left up for extended periods of time.

== Purpose ==
The Tabernacle was the location of the church's semi-annual general conference for 132 years. Because of the growth in the number of attendees, general conference was moved to the new and larger Conference Center in 2000. In the October 1999 General Conference, church president Gordon B. Hinckley gave a talk honoring the Tabernacle and introducing the new Conference Center. The building is still used for overflow crowds during general conference.

The Tabernacle is the home of The Tabernacle Choir at Temple Square, and was the previous home of the Utah Symphony Orchestra until the construction of Abravanel Hall. It is the historic broadcasting home for the radio and television program known as Music and the Spoken Word.

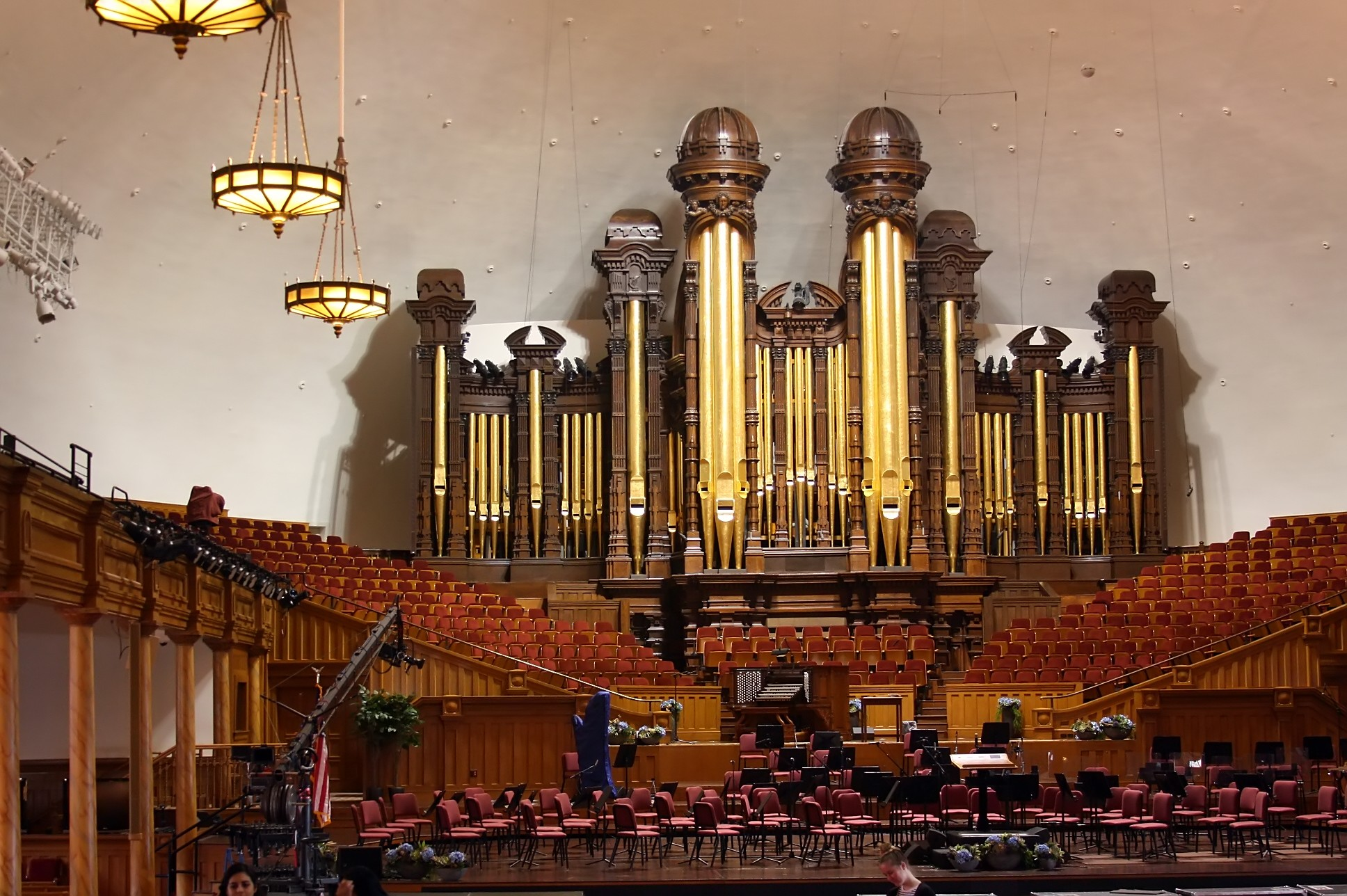
The Salt Lake Tabernacle organ

== Acoustics ==
Built at a time before electronics and audio amplifiers, the Tabernacle was constructed with remarkable acoustic qualities so the entire congregation could hear sermons given there. The roof was constructed in a three-dimensional ellipse with the pulpit at one focus of the ellipse. The elliptical concept came from church president Brigham Young, who reportedly said that the design was inspired by "the best sounding board in the world ... the roof of my mouth." The elliptical design causes a large portion of the sound from the pulpit end of the building to be concentrated and projected to the focus at the opposite end of the building.

Several years after the initial construction was completed, Truman O. Angell was brought in to further improve the building's acoustics, and was responsible for adding the gallery (balcony) in 1870 that resolved the outstanding acoustical issues. The building has an international reputation as one of the most acoustically perfect buildings in the world. A pin drop can be heard from one side of the building to another over 250 feet away.

== Refurbishing ==
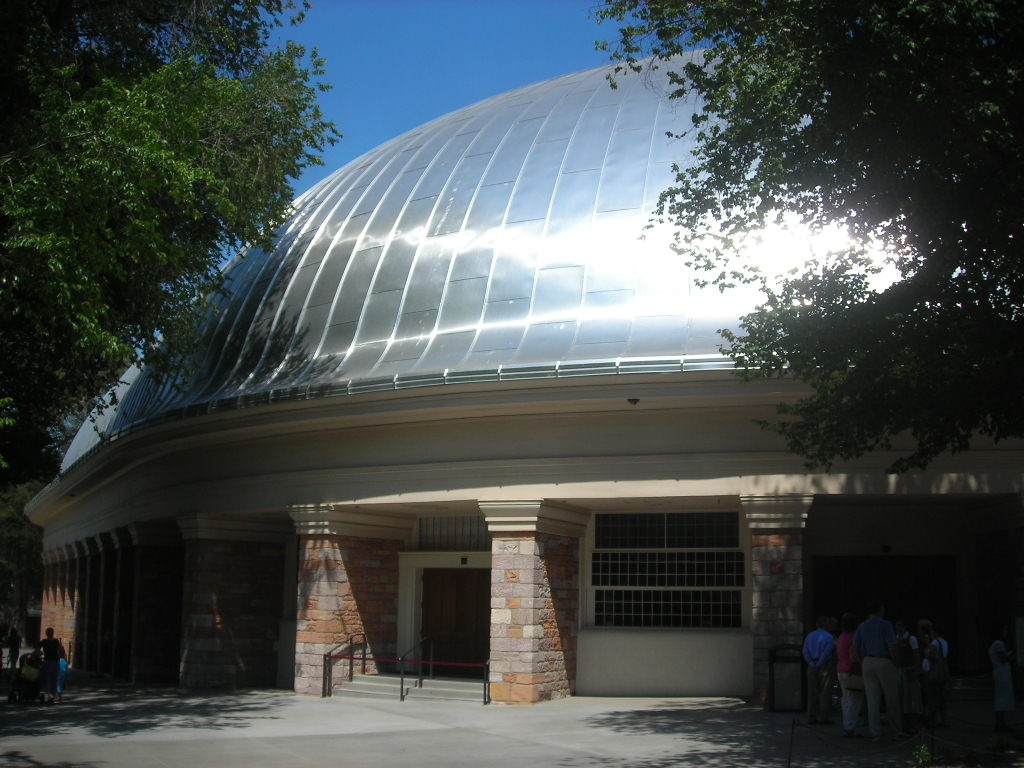
The Tabernacle with its newly refinished aluminum roof in 2008

The Tabernacle was closed from January 2005 to March 2007 for seismic retrofitting and extensive renovations. The baptistry, which was located in the lower portion at the rear of the Tabernacle, was removed as part of the renovation. New gold leafing was applied to the visible organ pipes, the ceiling was repaired and repainted, new dressing rooms and a music library for choir members were created, three recording studios were built underneath the main floor, the rostrum was remodeled to accommodate a secondary seating arrangement or a stage for performances, and all plumbing was replaced. The building was reopened in March 2007, and rededicated for use on March 31, 2007. An opening gala concert with the Tabernacle Choir was held on April 6–7, 2007.

As part of the renovation, all 44 piers that support the Tabernacle's roof were reinforced with steel bars, which were inserted into the piers from the bottom. The foundation of each pier was also reinforced with concrete. Steel boxes were used to connect trusses, and were also attached to the piers, clinched tight with structural steel.

== Notable speakers and guests ==
Twelve presidents of the United States have spoken from the Tabernacle pulpit: Theodore Roosevelt (1903), William Howard Taft (1909 and 1911), Woodrow Wilson (1919), Warren G. Harding (1923), Franklin D. Roosevelt (1932, then Governor of New York), Herbert Hoover (1932), Harry S. Truman (1948), Dwight D. Eisenhower (1952), John F. Kennedy (1963), Lyndon B. Johnson (1964), Richard Nixon (1970), and Jimmy Carter (1978).

Other notable people who have spoken in the Tabernacle include Susan B. Anthony (1895), Charles Lindbergh (1927), and Helen Keller (1941). Along with praising the decision to allow women equal voting rights in Utah Territory, Anthony praised the Tabernacle itself: "It is just about twenty-four years ago that I was present in this great Tabernacle on the day upon which you dedicated it to the service of the Lord, and every nook and corner, of this great building was packed on the occasion with people from every part of the Territory, many being unable to gain admittance. It was the most magnificent gathering I ever saw."

In 1980, James Stewart guest-conducted the Tabernacle Choir in the building as part of the filming of Mr. Krueger's Christmas, a television special broadcast on NBC.

== Tourism ==
Initially tourists were discouraged from visiting the Tabernacle because it was considered as holy as the Temple or Endowment House. There were even some debates among church leadership in the late 19th century about disciplining members of the church who led tours, but tours were led through 1900.

Currently tours are offered to anyone who would like one. It is common for LDS Church missionaries tour guides to demonstrate the acoustic properties of the Tabernacle by dropping a pin on the pulpit or tearing a newspaper there, which can be heard throughout the building.

== See also ==
- List of concert halls
- Salt Lake Assembly Hall
- Salt Lake Temple
- List of pipe organs
