= Cottonwood Heights, Utah =

City in the United States

- City
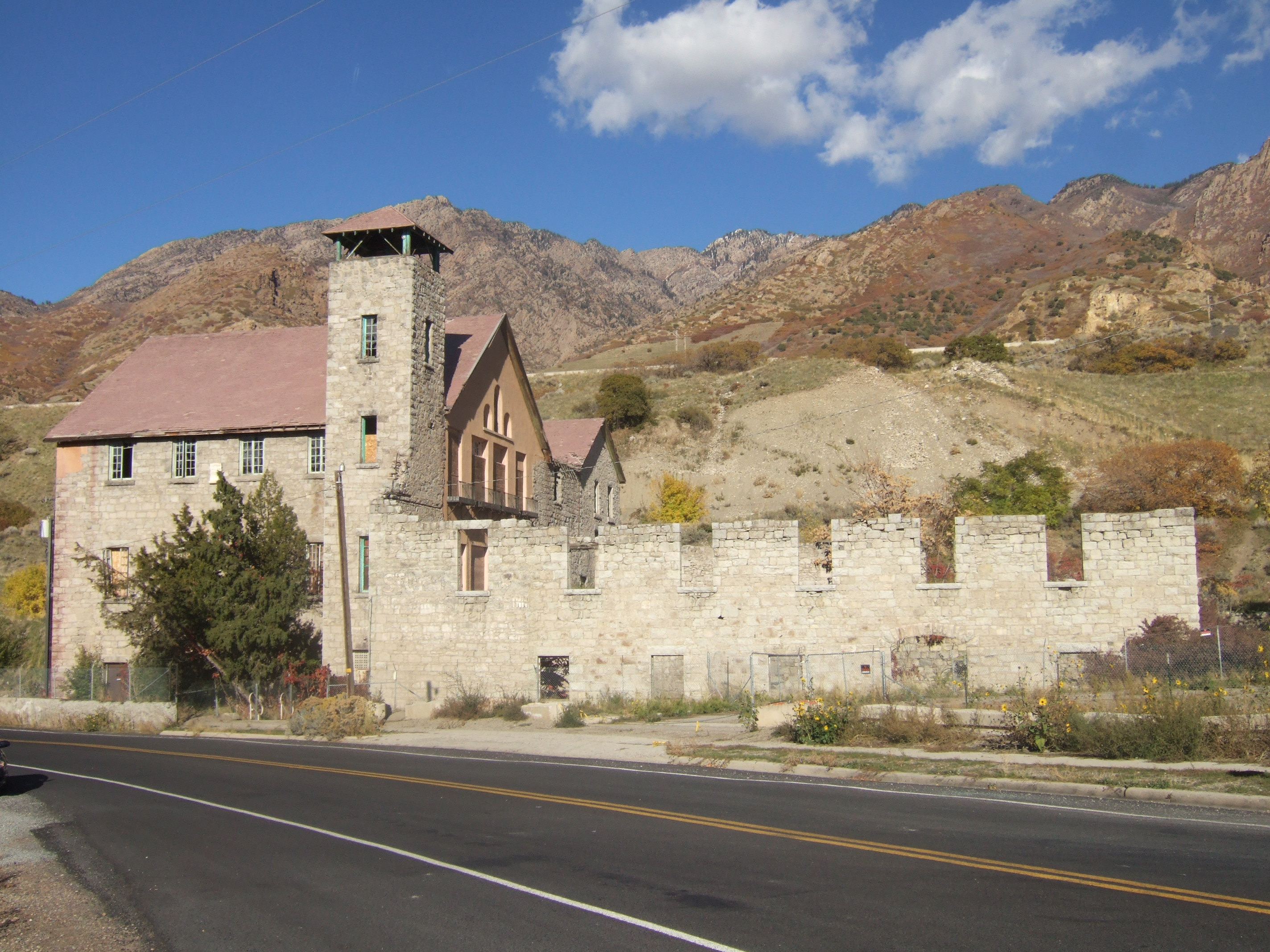
- The old Cottonwood Paper Mill, built in 1883 by the Deseret News in Cottonwood Heights
- Nickname: City between the canyons
- Location in Salt Lake County and the state of Utah
- Coordinates: 40°37′2″N 111°49′13″W
- Country: United States
- State: Utah
- County: Salt Lake
- Incorporated: January 14, 2005
- Named for: Cottonwood trees

Area
  - Total: 9.23 sq mi (23.91 km^{2})
  - Land: 9.23 sq mi (23.91 km^{2})
  - Water: 0 sq mi (0.00 km^{2})
- Elevation: 4,820 ft (1,470 m)

Population (2020)
  - Total: 33,617
  - Density: 3,641/sq mi (1,406/km^{2})
- Time zone: UTC−7 (Mountain (MST))
  - Summer (DST): UTC−6 (MDT)
- Area codes: 385, 801
- FIPS code: 49-16270
- GNIS feature ID: 1440025
- Website: cottonwoodheights.utah.gov

Cottonwood Heights is a city located in Salt Lake County, Utah, United States, along the east bench of the Salt Lake Valley. It lies south of the cities of Holladay and Murray, east of Midvale, and north of Sandy within the Salt Lake City, Utah Metropolitan Statistical Area. Originally a census-designated place (CDP), following a successful referendum in May 2004, the city was incorporated on January 14, 2005. The population, as of the 2020 census, was 33,617.

The corporate offices of Instructure, Dyno Nobel, the defunct Fusion-io, Extra Space Storage, Breeze Airways, and JetBlue are located in the city.

== Geography ==
As the city's name suggests, its geography is dominated by a high ridge separating the valleys of the Big and Little Cottonwood Creeks. At the eastern edge of the city, these valleys narrow into the Big and Little Cottonwood Canyons within the Wasatch Mountains, respectively. This is reflected by the city's official nickname, "City between the canyons". The ridge is covered in suburban housing, but most commercial development has been restricted to the lower-lying areas north of the ridge (along Fort Union Boulevard, in Fort Union itself, and near Big Cottonwood Creek and the "Old Mill" in the northeast corner of the city).

State Route 190 and State Route 210 run near the eastern edge of the city and provide access to the canyons; they are the only state routes that enter the city. Interstate 215 runs along the northern border of the city, and State Route 152 touches the city at a point. The city is building a multi-use trail along the full length of Big Cottonwood Creek within its borders.

Cottonwood Heights is in the Canyons School District; Brighton High School is the only public high school. Butler Middle School is the only middle school within city limits.

According to the United States Census Bureau, the CDP had a total area of 6.8 square miles (17.6 km^{2}), all land.

=== Climate ===
Climate data for Cottonwood Heights (station coordinates:40.5933°N 111.7922°W), 1991–2020 normals
Month	Jan	Feb	Mar	Apr	May	Jun	Jul	Aug	Sep	Oct	Nov	Dec	Year
Average precipitation inches (mm)	2.36 (60)	2.33 (59)	2.77 (70)	3.49 (89)	3.13 (80)	1.53 (39)	0.92 (23)	1.11 (28)	1.72 (44)	2.21 (56)	1.98 (50)	2.37 (60)	25.92 (658)
Source: NOAA

== Demographics ==
Historical population
Census	Pop.	Note	%±
1980	22,665		—
1990	28,766		26.9%
2000	27,569		−4.2%
2010	33,433		21.3%
2020	33,617		0.6%

=== 2020 census ===
As of the 2020 census, Cottonwood Heights had a population of 33,617. The median age was 39.1 years. 22.1% of residents were under the age of 18 and 18.4% were 65 years or older. For every 100 females, there were 98.5 males, and for every 100 females aged 18 and over, there were 97.1 males aged 18 and over.

100.0% of residents lived in urban areas, while 0.0% lived in rural areas.

There were 12,762 households in Cottonwood Heights, of which 30.5% had children under the age of 18 living in them. Of all households, 56.2% were married-couple households, 16.7% were households with a male householder and no spouse or partner present, and 21.3% were households with a female householder and no spouse or partner present. About 22.0% of all households were made up of individuals, and 8.3% had someone living alone who was 65 years of age or older.

There were 13,536 housing units, of which 5.7% were vacant. The homeowner vacancy rate was 0.9%, and the rental vacancy rate was 7.8%.

Racial composition as of the 2020 census
Race	Number	Percent
White	28,646	85.2%
Black or African American	248	0.7%
American Indian and Alaska Native	167	0.5%
Asian	1,159	3.4%
Native Hawaiian and Other Pacific Islander	88	0.3%
Some other race	735	2.2%
Two or more races	2,574	7.7%
Hispanic or Latino (of any race)	2,331	6.9%

== Local media ==
- The Cottonwood/Holladay City Journal (tabloid-style newspaper), covering local government, schools, sports, and features.

== Police services ==
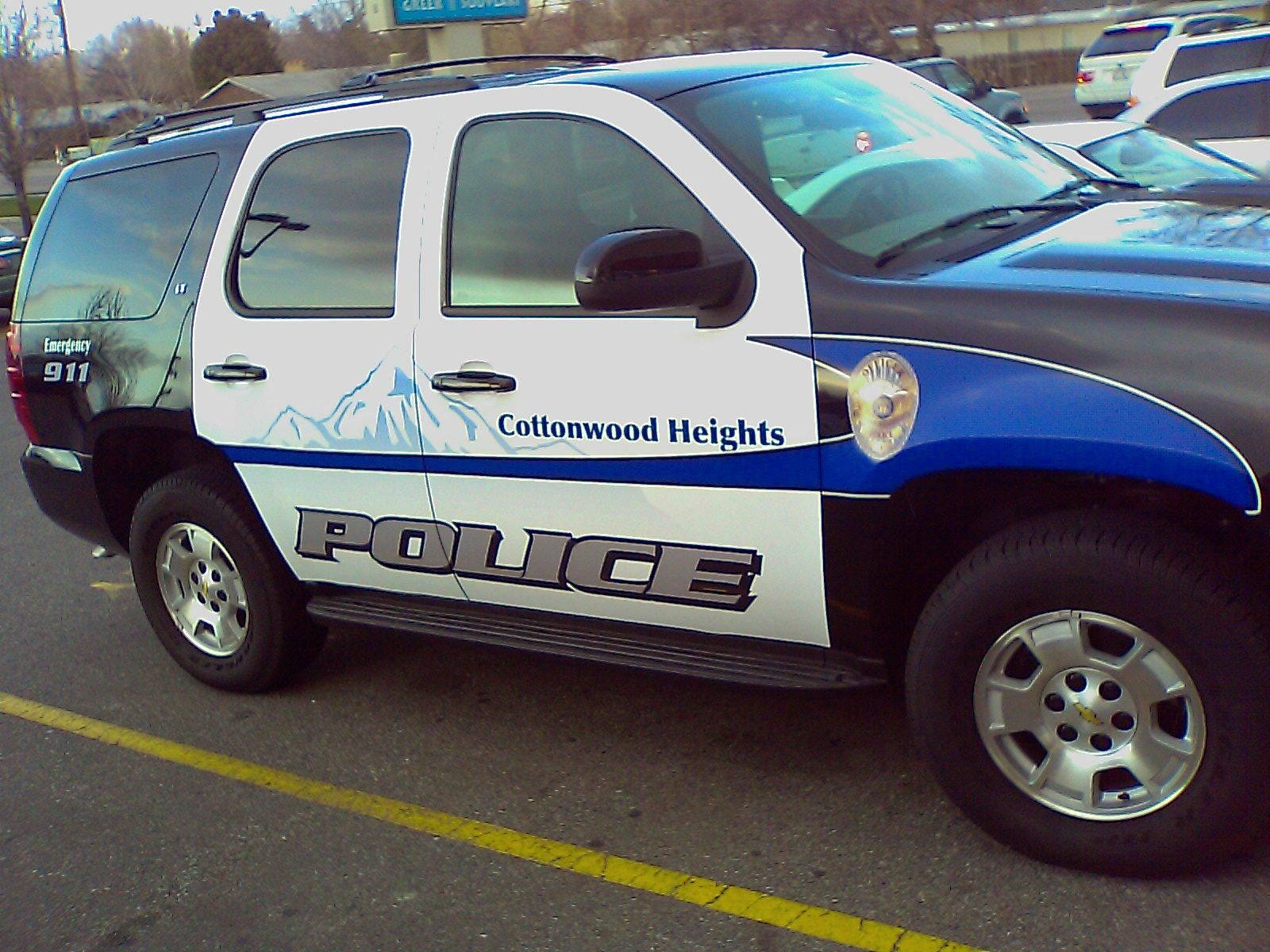
Cottonwood Heights Police vehicle

On January 8, 2008, the Cottonwood Heights City Council voted to create its own police department and withdraw from its current contract with the Salt Lake County Sheriff's Department.

== Notable people ==
- Jackson Barton, American football tackle
- Cody Barton, American football linebacker
- Greg Curtis, former Speaker of the Utah House of Representatives
- Tristan Gale, Olympic gold medalist
- Gordon Hudson, American football tight end
- Bryan Kehl, American football linebacker
- Trevor Lewis, ice hockey player
- Reno Mahe, American football running back
- Post Malone, musician
- David Neeleman, former CEO of JetBlue Airways
- Boyd K. Packer, Latter-Day Saint leader
- Mark Shurtleff, former Utah attorney general
- Scott Johnson, cartoonist
- William R. Walker, Canadian-American Mormon leader
- Eric Kraan, Mexican speed skater

== See also ==
- List of cities and towns in Utah
