= Eric Kraan =

Mexican business owner and former speed skater (born 1971)

Personal information
- Born: Eric Rijk Kraan Osmanchuk; 10 December 1971 (age 54) Mexico City, Mexico
- Education: UT El Paso

Sport
- Country: Mexico
- Sport: Speed skating
- Personal best(s): 500 m: 41.18 (2003); 1000 m: 1:22.03 (2005); 1500 m: 2:08.32 (2003) (NR); 3000 m: 4:37.02 (2005) (NR); 5000 m: 8:12.17 (2004) (NR); 10000 m: 16:56.77 (2005) (NR); NR = National Record

Eric Rijk Kraan Osmanchuk (born 10 December 1971) is a Mexican business owner and former Mexico National Team speed skater. He resides in the US and is co-owner and co-CEO of the SkateNow Shop, a speed skating equipment retailer. In 2017, he ran as a candidate for District 4, city council, in Cottonwood Heights, Utah; in 2021, he filed as a candidate for mayor.

== Mexico National Team speed skater ==
Kraan represented Mexico between 2000 and 2006 on the national long-track speed skating team, and he competed in international world cups. He set and still holds most of Mexico's national records.

== skateNOW ==
Kraan runs skateNOW, a website that sells skates and skate sport-related equipment.
