= Old Salt Lake Tabernacle =

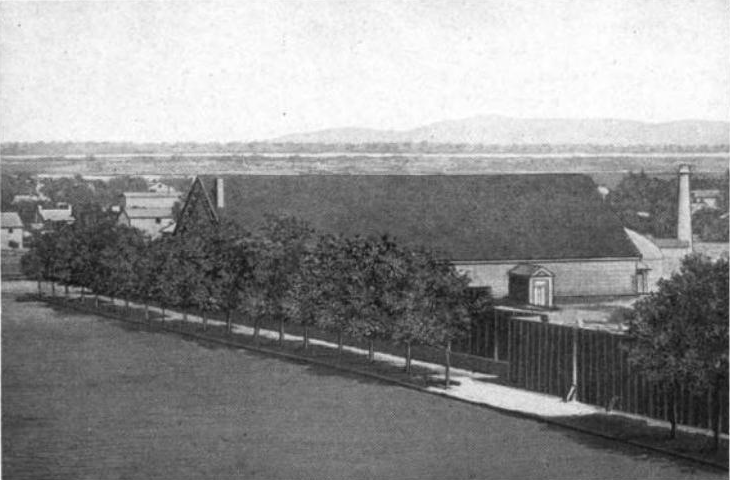
Old Salt Lake Tabernacle

The Old Salt Lake Tabernacle, was a tabernacle of the Church of Jesus Christ of Latter-day Saints that was built in 1852 in Salt Lake City, Utah Territory. It stood on Temple Square where the Salt Lake Assembly Hall now stands. The building was 126 feet long and 64 feet wide and seated 2,500. It was constructed of adobe bricks. It was also called the Old Tabernacle and the Adobe Tabernacle. It was the original home of the Mormon Tabernacle Choir. Improvements were made in 1860s, but it was demolished in 1877 and replaced with the Assembly Hall, a larger structure.
