= Obed Taylor =

American architect, based in Utah

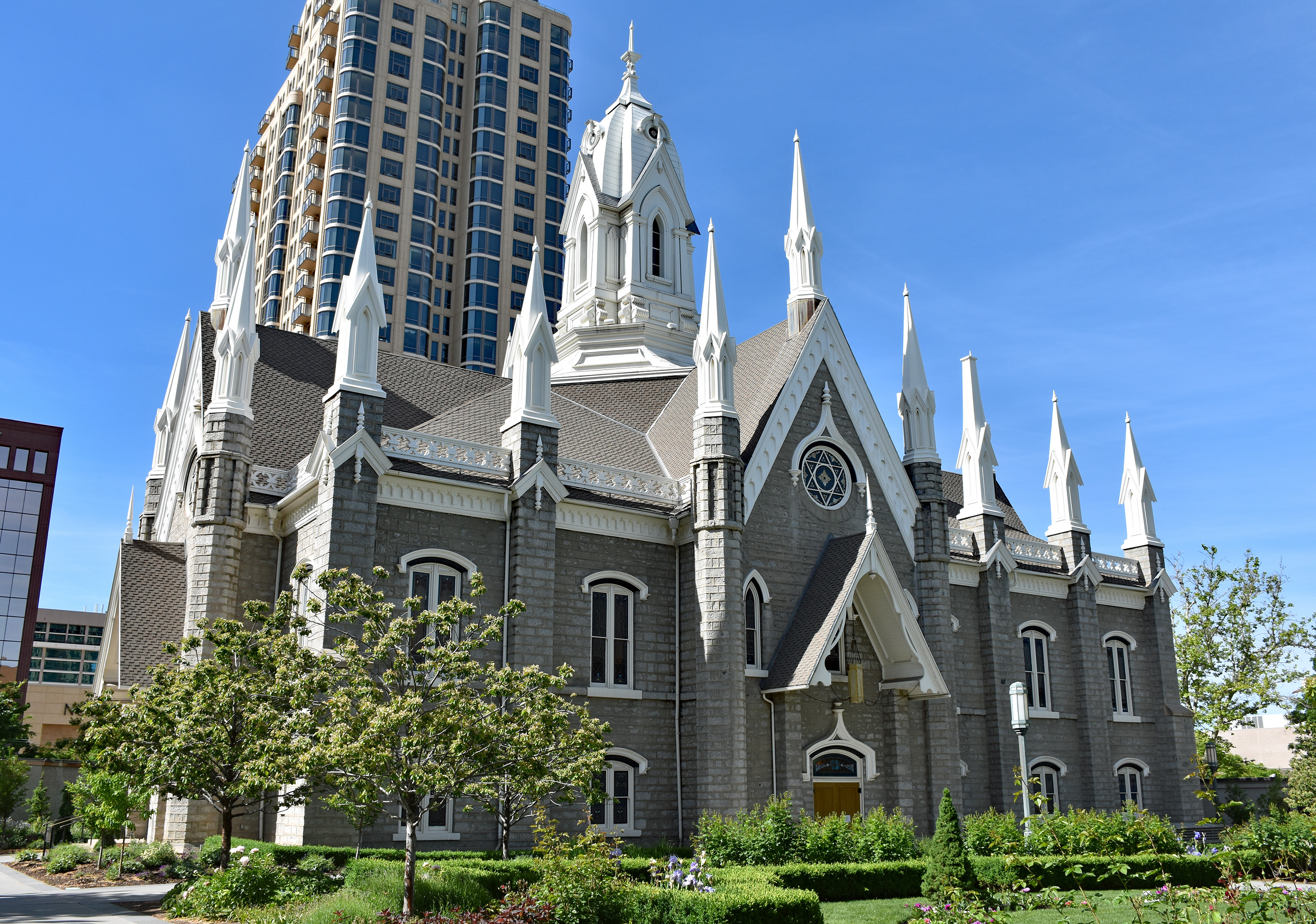
Salt Lake Assembly Hall, designed by Taylor

Obed Taylor (April 27, 1824 – August 2, 1881) was an architect who designed many notable buildings in early Utah that survive on the National Register of Historic Places.

== Personal life ==
He was baptized into the Church of Jesus Christ of Latter-day Saints by Parley P. Pratt and came to Salt Lake City, Utah in 1871. He died at the height of his architectural career in 1881.

== Works ==
- Salt Lake 18th Ward meetinghouse
- Salt Lake Assembly Hall (on Temple Square)
- Summit Stake Tabernacle (Note: Although Thomas L. Allen has been credited with being the architect of the Summit Stake Tabernacle, Taylor approved of the plans and likely assisted Allen who was untrained as an architect.)
- University Hall, University of Deseret (Note: Redesigned and completed by John H. Burton, following Taylor's death) on Union Square
- Walker Opera House (Note: Completed following Taylor's death)
- ZCMI & First National Bank Block (Ogden, Utah, 1881)
- In partnership with William H. Folsom:
  - Deseret National Bank building (1875)
  - Feramorz Little residence
  - ZCMI Cast Iron Front (1876)
