= Jensen House =

Jensen House or variations may refer to:

== In the United States ==
- Cornelius Jensen Ranch, Rubidoux, California, listed on the National Register of Historic Places (NRHP)
- Jensen Ranch (Selma, California)
- Elmer C. Jensen House, Chicago, Illinois
- Jens Jensen Summer House and Studio, Highland Park, Illinois, NRHP-listed, a home of Jens Jensen (landscape architect)
- Chris Jensen Round Barn, Lena, Illinois, NRHP-listed
- Arendt Jensen House, Gardnerville, Nevada, listed on the NRHP in Douglas County
- Arendt Jensen Jr. House, Gardnerville, Nevada, listed on the NRHP in Douglas County
- Governor Leslie Jensen House, Hot Springs, South Dakota, NRHP-listed
- James L. Jensen House, Houston, Texas, NRHP-listed in Harris County
- Hans C. Jensen House, Ephraim, Utah, NRHP-listed in Sanpete County
- Rasmus Jensen House, Ephraim, Utah, NRHP-listed in Sanpete County
- Frederick C. Jensen House, Mount Pleasant, Utah, NRHP-listed in Sanpete County
- Lars and Agnes Jensen House, Orem, Utah, NRHP-listed
- Joseph F. and Isabelle Jensen House, Sandy, Utah, NRHP-listed in Salt Lake County
- James B. and Ellen May Cushing Jensen House, Sandy, Utah, NRHP-listed in Salt Lake County
- Michael Jensen House, Sandy, Utah, NRHP-listed in Salt Lake County
- Jensen-Clark House, Sandy, Utah, NRHP-listed in Salt Lake County
- Allsop-Jensen House, Sandy, Utah, NRHP-listed in Salt Lake County
- Amos and Ida Jensen House, Sandy, Utah, NRHP-listed in Salt Lake County
- Jensen-Jensen House, Sandy, Utah, NRHP-listed in Salt Lake County
- Tollef Jensen House, Galesville, Wisconsin, NRHP-listed in Trempealeau County
- J. L. Jensen House, Stevens Point, Wisconsin, NRHP-listed in Portage County
- Matt and Lena Jensen House, Waupaca, Wisconsin, NRHP-listed in Waupaca County
- Jensen Ranch (Boulder, Wyoming), NRHP-listed in Sublette County

== See also ==
- Jensen Ranch (disambiguation)
