= Jensen Ranch =

Jensen Ranch may refer to:

- Jensen Alvarado Ranch, also called Cornelius Jensen Ranch, park and museum in Riverside County, California, listed on the National Register of Historic Places (NRHP)
- Jensen Ranch (Selma, California), a historic ranch
- Jensen Ranch (Boulder, Wyoming), listed on the NRHP

== See also ==
- Jensen House (disambiguation)
