= Sandy Historic District =

Historic district in Sandy, Utah, United States

- U.S. National Register of Historic Places
- U.S. Historic district
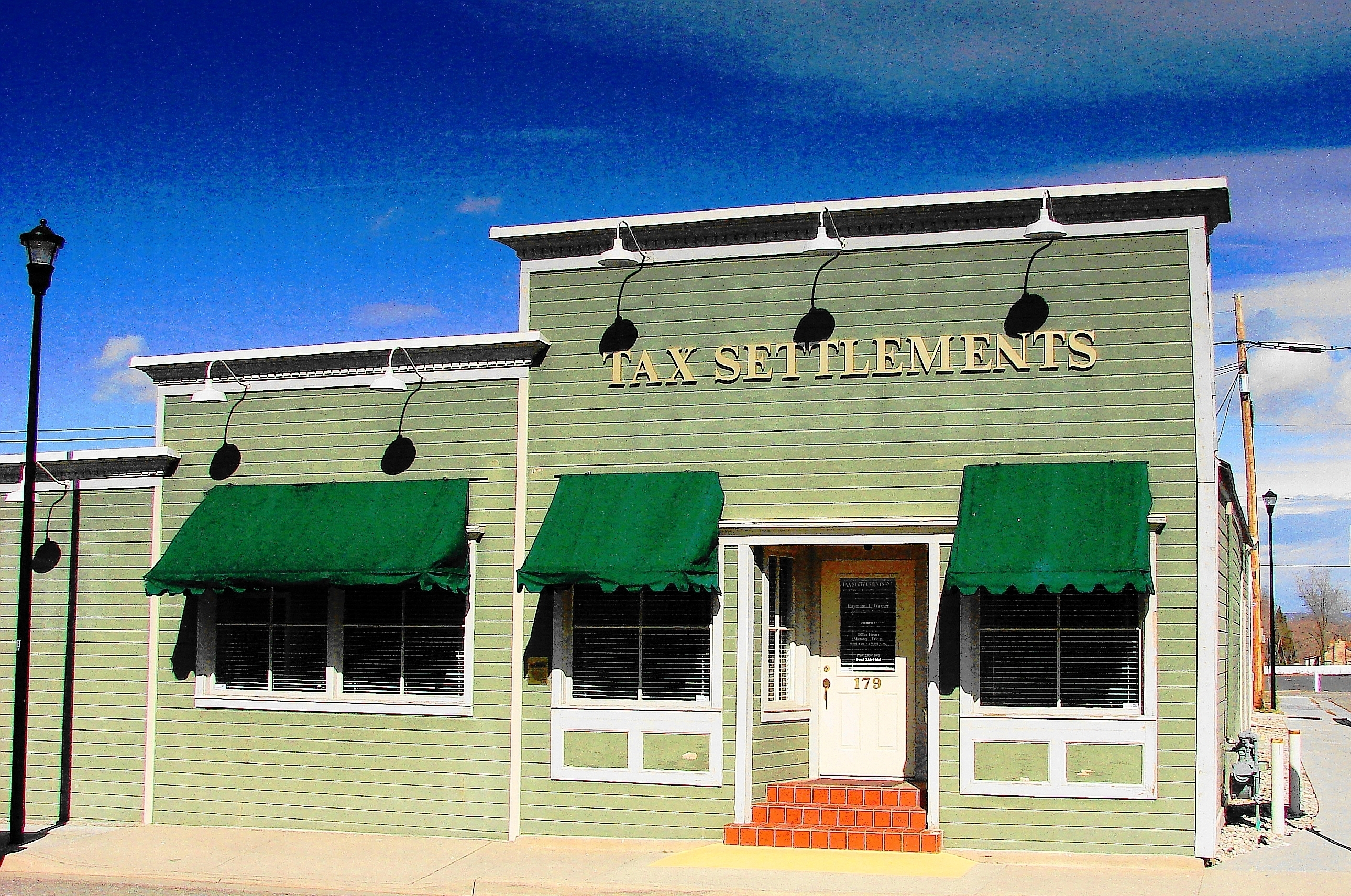
- The Jensen Kuhre store in the Sandy Historic District, February 2009

- Location within Utah Location within the United States Location within the United States
- Location: Roughly bounded by South State Street, East 9000 South, South 700 East, and Pioneer Avenue; Sandy, Utah; United states
- Coordinates: 40°35′34″N 111°52′51″W
- Area: 266.3 acres (1.078 km^{2})
- Built: 1875
- Architect: multiple
- Architectural style: Late Victorian, Colonial Revival, et al.
- MPS: Sandy City MPS
- NRHP reference No.: 07000084
- Added to NRHP: April 20, 2007

The Sandy Historic District is a Historic District in Sandy, Utah, United States, that is listed on the National Register of Historic Places (NRHP) and covers most of the city's pre-suburbanization extent.

== Description ==
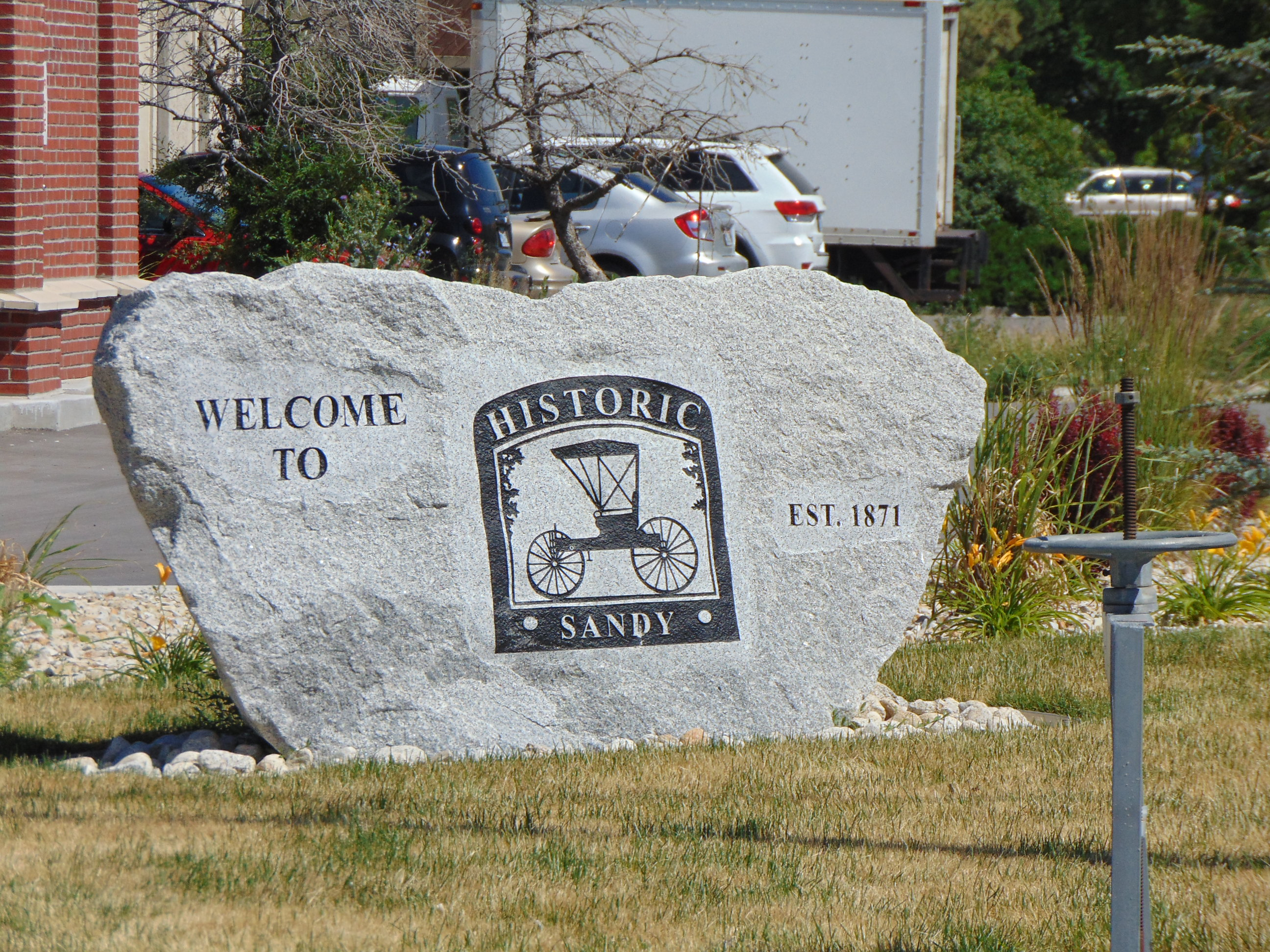
Sandy Historic District sign, June 2016

The district is essentially the area east of South State Street (US-89), west of South 700 East (SR-71) north of East 9000 South (SR-209), and south of Pioneer Avenue (8530 South; near the northern boundary of the city of Sandy). About half of the NRHP in Salt Lake County (outside of Salt Lake City) are in Sandy, and the large majority of those are within the Historic District.

The district included 51 properties which were already listed in the National Register, plus 266 more contributing buildings, and 223 non-contributing buildings. The district includes the NRHP-listed Jensen-Clark House, at 42 East Main Street.

== History ==
Sandy was initially an agricultural settlement, but then became dominated by mining and smelting for a short time. When major smelting operations moved north to Murray and Midvale, the town was free from development pressures until suburbanization reached the area in the 1970s, by which time developers had almost totally lost interest in infill development; the Historic District thus has experienced very little large-scale redevelopment for a long time (though many individual houses have been added or rebuilt).

A smelter (now represented only by a historic monument) previously operated just south of the historic district, near State Street. A large cemetery is east of that, next to 700 East. A museum of Sandy's history occupies a small building just south of Sandy's Main Street, facing the rail main line now used by TRAX. The Salt Lake and Alta Railroad previously split from that main line just north of the district before curving through the northern parts of the district on its way to Granite and Alta.

== Transportation ==
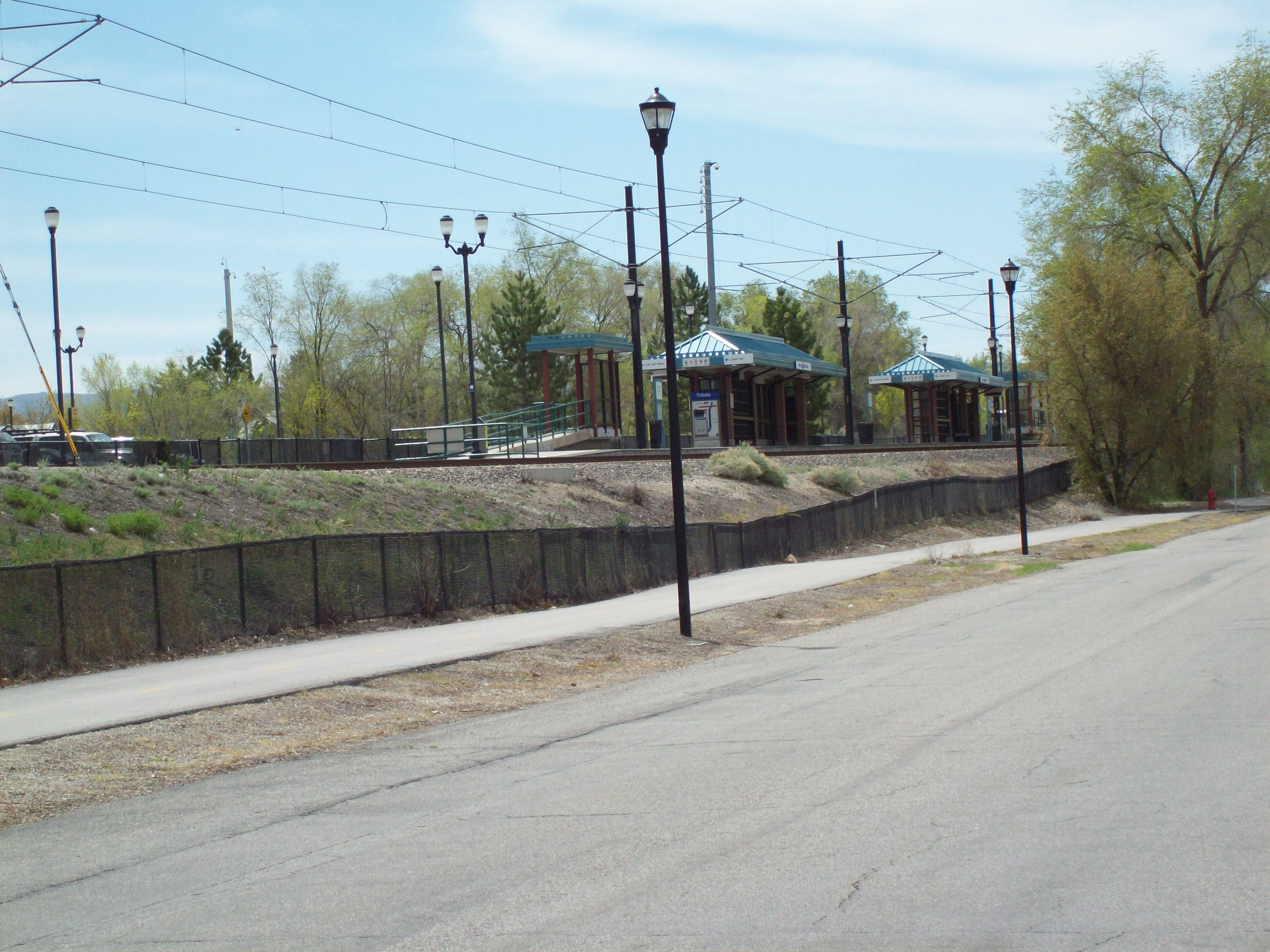
Historic Sandy station, northwest side, April 2013

The street grid in the area has much smaller blocks than those in other parts of the county that followed Salt Lake City's layout decisions. Sandy also has its own Main Street (at East 8720 South in the county's now-unified addressing system) that runs east to west rather than north to south like the county's most prominent Main Street. The street runs from a few blocks west of South State Street to the steps of Sandy Elementary School, which is within the historic district, and passes in front of various historic buildings.

As was once very common in early Great Basin settlements, irrigation water flows in street-side gutters in some places. The East Jordan Canal, a much larger canal carrying water from the Jordan River north toward Salt Lake City, also passes through the center of the district.

The district is served by Utah Transit Authority's TRAX light rail system's Blue Line at Historic Sandy station south of Main Street and a few blocks east of State Street.

== See also ==
- Sandy City Bank
- National Register of Historic Places listings in Salt Lake County, Utah
