= Willow Creek (Jordan River tributary) =

Willow Creek is a tributary stream of the Jordan River, in Salt Lake County, Utah.

Its mouth is at its confluence with the Jordan River, west of Draper at an elevation of 4,318 feet (1,316 m). Its source is located at an elevation of 4,980 feet (1,520 m) at 40°32′47″N 111°48′42″W, the confluence of Big Willow Creek and Rocky Mouth Canyon that flow down the west slope of 11,253-foot (3,430 m) Lone Peak in the Wasatch Range.

== See also ==
- List of rivers of Utah
