= Joseph F. and Isabelle Jensen House =

- U.S. National Register of Historic Places
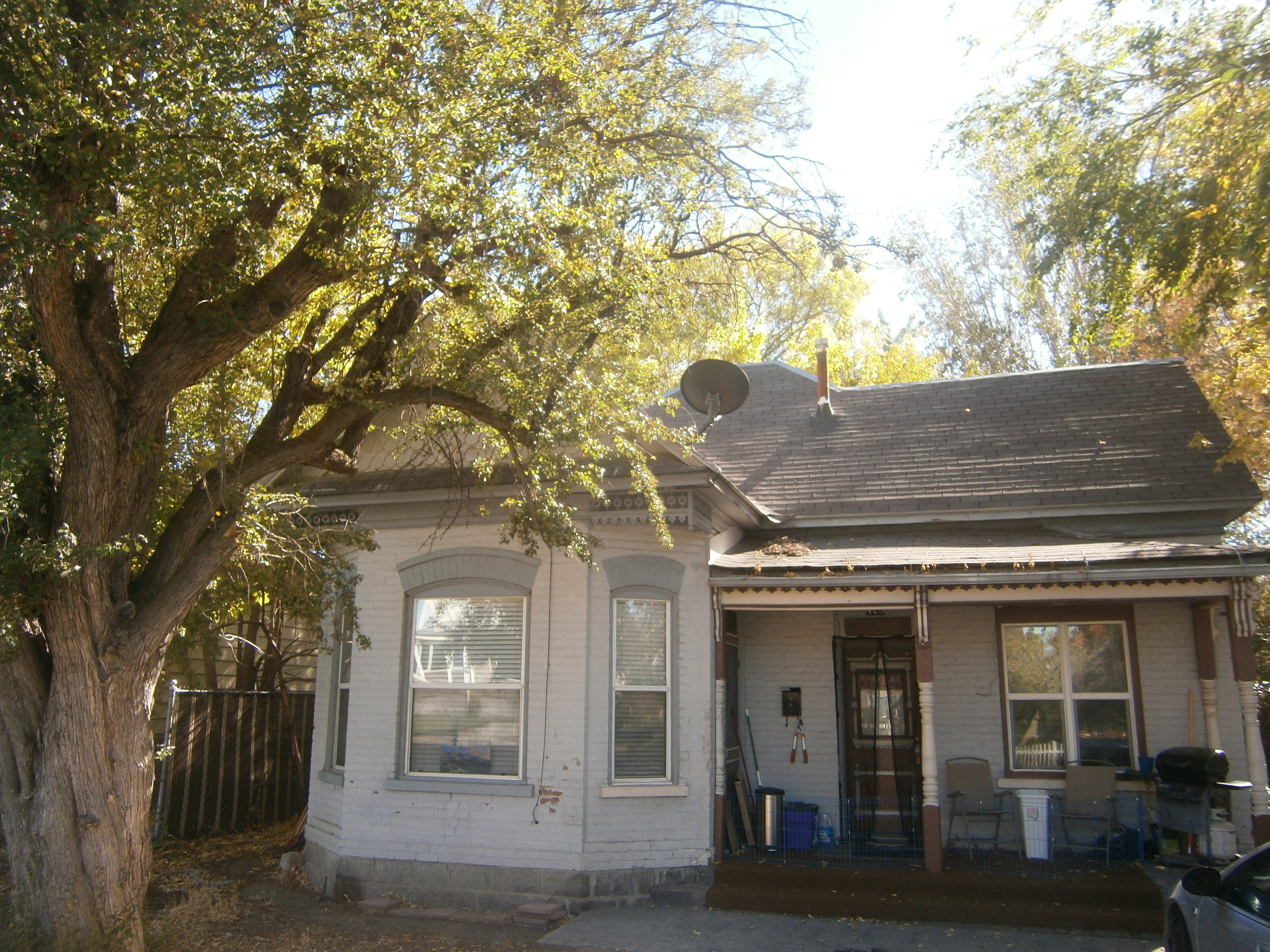

- Location within Utah Location within the United States
- Location: 428 East 8800 South, Sandy, Utah
- Coordinates: 40°35′31″N 111°52′44″W
- Area: 0.3 acres (0.12 ha)
- Built: c.1902
- Architectural style: Late Victorian
- MPS: Sandy City MPS
- NRHP reference No.: 98000640
- Added to NRHP: June 11, 1998

The Joseph F. and Isabelle Jensen House, at 428 East 8800 South in Sandy, Utah, was built around 1902. It was listed on the National Register of Historic Places in 1998, and it is also included in the National Register-listed Sandy Historic District

It is a one-story brick Victorian cottage with Queen Anne-style detailing.

Its bricks are laid in stretcher bond.

It is located on the northeast corner of the intersection of S. 420 E. with E. 8800 S. There is a white picket fence outlining the property on its two street-facing sides.
