= East Jordan Canal =

Historic waterway in Salt Lake City, Utah

Coordinates: 40.6160589°N 111.8710456°W

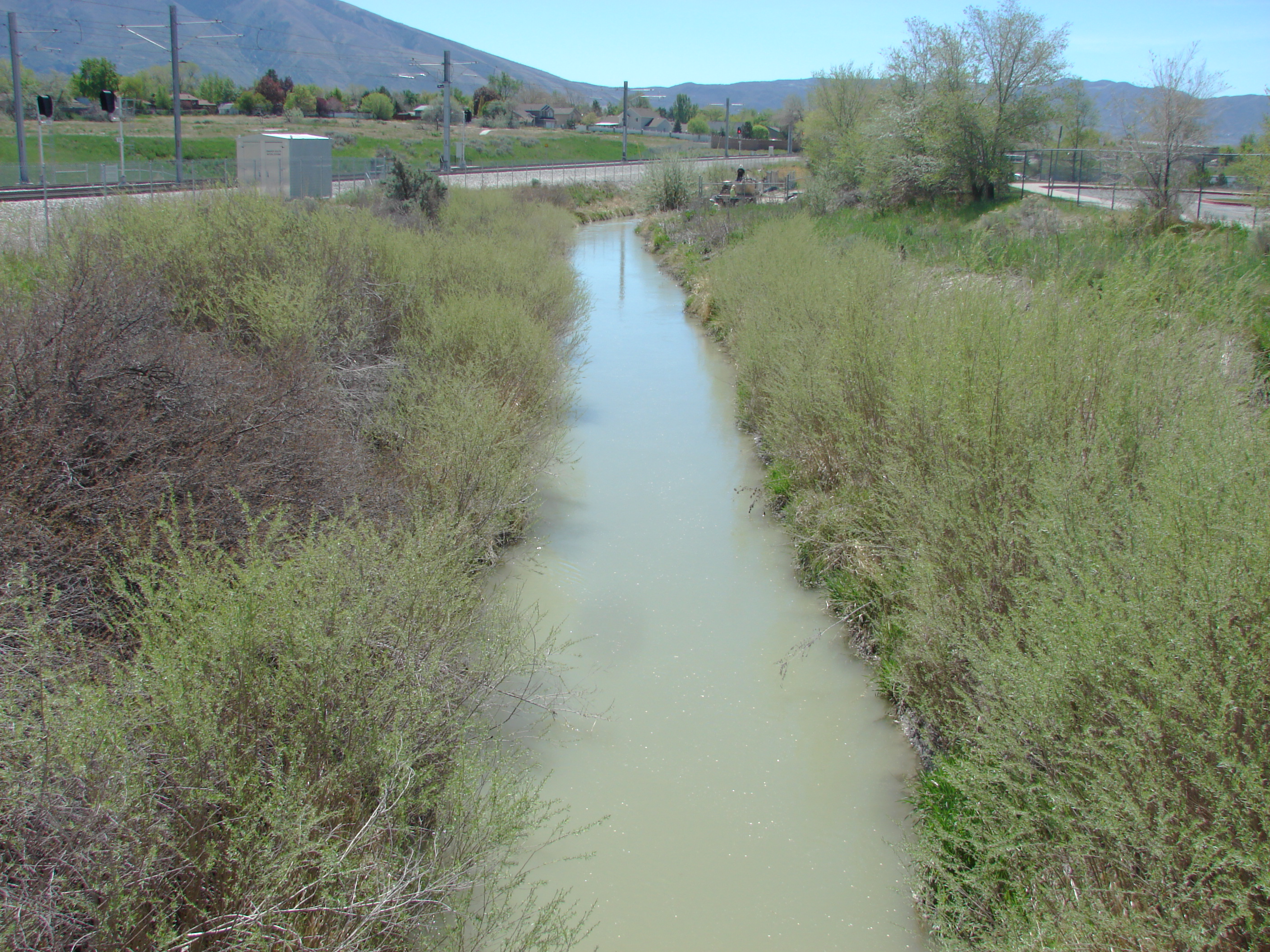
Looking south along the East Jordan Canal at the Sandy Civic Center TRAX station in Sandy, April 2015

The East Jordan Canal is a historic waterway in Salt Lake County, Utah, United States.

== Description ==
The canal is owned by Salt Lake City Public Utilities. The canal exits the Jordan River at Turner Dam, along with the Utah and Salt Lake Canal. An extension of the canal was proposed in 2012, involving a partnership between Salt Lake City Public Utilities and the city of Cottonwood Heights that would result in the construction of a multi-use trail on top of the canal as it passes through an existing urban neighborhood.
