= South Jordan Canal =

Coordinates: 40°27′36.54″N 111°55′56.73″W

The South Jordan Canal is an historic waterway in Salt Lake County, Utah, United States.

== Description ==
The canal was completed in 1876. The canal took water out of the Jordan River in Bluffdale and for the first time brought it above the river bluffs in what is now South Jordan. As a result of the new canal, most of the families settled among the bluffs moved up away from the river onto the "flats" above the river which they could now irrigate.

The Canal remains in operation to this day by the South Jordan Canal Company. The President is Gary Cannon.
