= Sandy City Bank =

- U.S. National Register of Historic Places
- U.S. Historic district – Contributing property
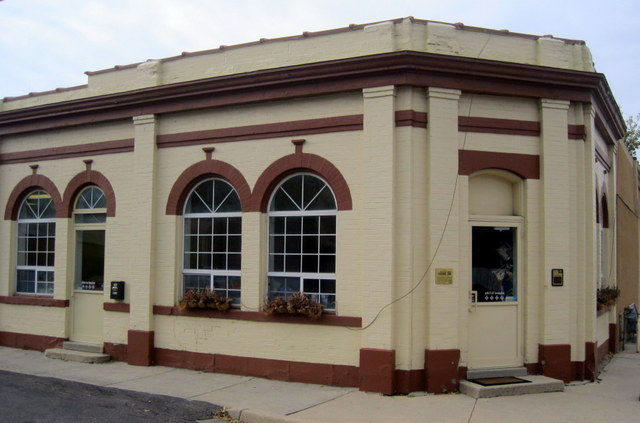

- Location within Utah Location within the United States
- Location: 212 E. Main St., Sandy, Utah
- Coordinates: 40°35′33″N 111°52′55″W
- Area: 0.1 acres (0.040 ha)
- Built: 1907
- Architectural style: Late 19th and 20th Century Revivals, Italian Renaissance
- Part of: Sandy Historic District (ID07000084)
- MPS: Sandy City MPS
- NRHP reference No.: 97000637

Significant dates
- Added to NRHP: July 9, 1997
- Designated CP: April 20, 2007

The Sandy City Bank, at 212 E. Main St. in Sandy, Utah, was built in 1907. It includes Late 19th and 20th Century Revivals and Italian Renaissance architecture. It was listed on the National Register of Historic Places in 1997.

It is an example of Italian Renaissance Revival style architecture, also known as Second Renaissance Revival, in the area of Sandy City.

In 1997 it was no longer a bank, and instead was a day care facility.
