= Allsop-Jensen House =

- U.S. National Register of Historic Places
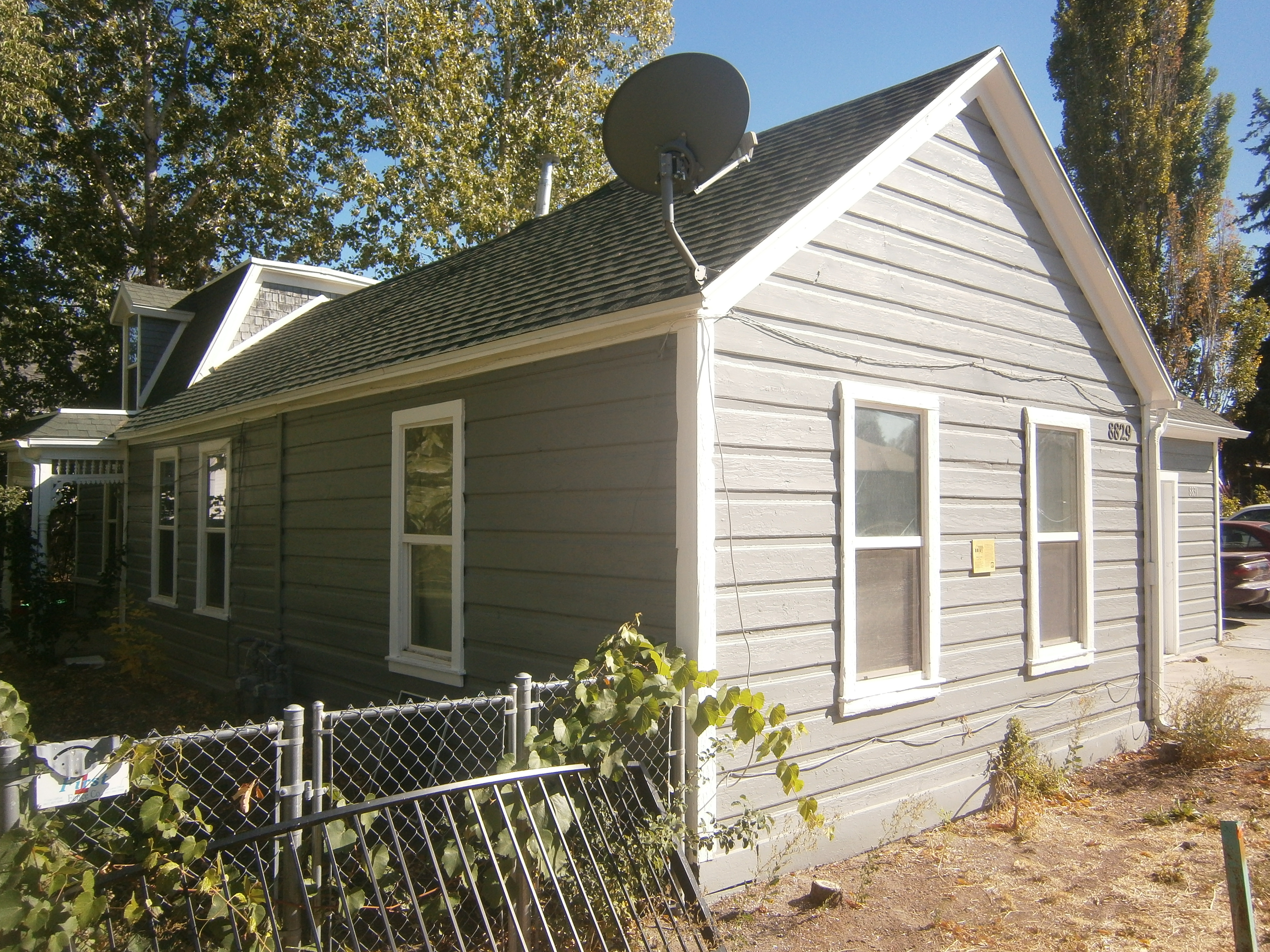

- Location within Utah Location within the United States
- Location: 8829 S. 400 East St., Sandy, Utah
- Coordinates: 40.591255°N 111.879858°W
- Area: 0.3 acres (0.12 ha)
- Built: c.1874, c.1892, and c.1900
- MPS: Sandy City MPS
- NRHP reference No.: 96000885
- Added to NRHP: August 8, 1996

The Allsop-Jensen House, at 8829 S. 400 East St. in Sandy, Utah, was listed on the National Register of Historic Places in 1996.

The property includes a house and a barn, both deemed to be contributing buildings.

The house was built in c.1874, c.1892, and c.1900.

About the barn:

The Allsop/Jensen Barn has been identified as the Watterson Barn, according to John Ralph Ferrin, MA Thesis, 1981. The barn is hewn log and wood frame construction. Ferrin indicates the barn was built in 1874 in Draper, from wood cut in Bell's canyon; later the barn was dismantled and moved to its present site in 1880. Ferrin notes several metal rings at the bottom logs, and states that they were used when the barn was dismantled and moved. Mr. Watterson, however, has stated that Evan Jensen (youngest son of James Jensen) indicated that the barn was dragged to its present site by team (with only the roof removed).

Does the barn still exist? Or could it have been moved and saved elsewhere? It appears to be gone. (Note: Google Streetview, dated June 2016, verifies house is there, as does Google Satellite view copyright 2019. The barn behind can be seen in the 2016 Google Streetview, from E. 8800 St. across a vacant lot. In Google Satellite view the vacant lot has been filled in: there are two or three new houses right on E. 8800 St. and a driveway between then to two new houses behind, seemingly where the barn was located.)
