= Frederick C. Jensen House =

- U.S. National Register of Historic Places
- Location within Utah Location within the United States
- Location: 215 S. 100 West, Mount Pleasant, Utah
- Coordinates: 39.543678°N 111.457046°W
- Area: 1.3 acres (0.53 ha)
- Built: 1891
- Architectural style: Stick/eastlake
- NRHP reference No.: 82004158
- Added to NRHP: April 19, 1982

The Frederick C. Jensen House is a historic house in Mount Pleasant, Utah. It was built in 1891 by Frederick C. Jensen, an immigrant from Denmark whose parents had converted to the Church of Jesus Christ of Latter-day Saints. After his father died, his mother relocated to Utah with her son in 1861. Jensen became a cabinet maker and furniture dealer in Mount Pleasant. His house was designed in the Victorian Eclectic style, with Eastlake, Second Empire, Classical Revival, and Carpenter Gothic features. Jensen bequeathed it to the Wasatch Academy. It has been listed on the National Register of Historic Places since April 19, 1982.

It is located at 215 S. 100 West in Mount Pleasant.
