= Tollef Jensen House =

Historic house in Wisconsin, United States

- U.S. National Register of Historic Places
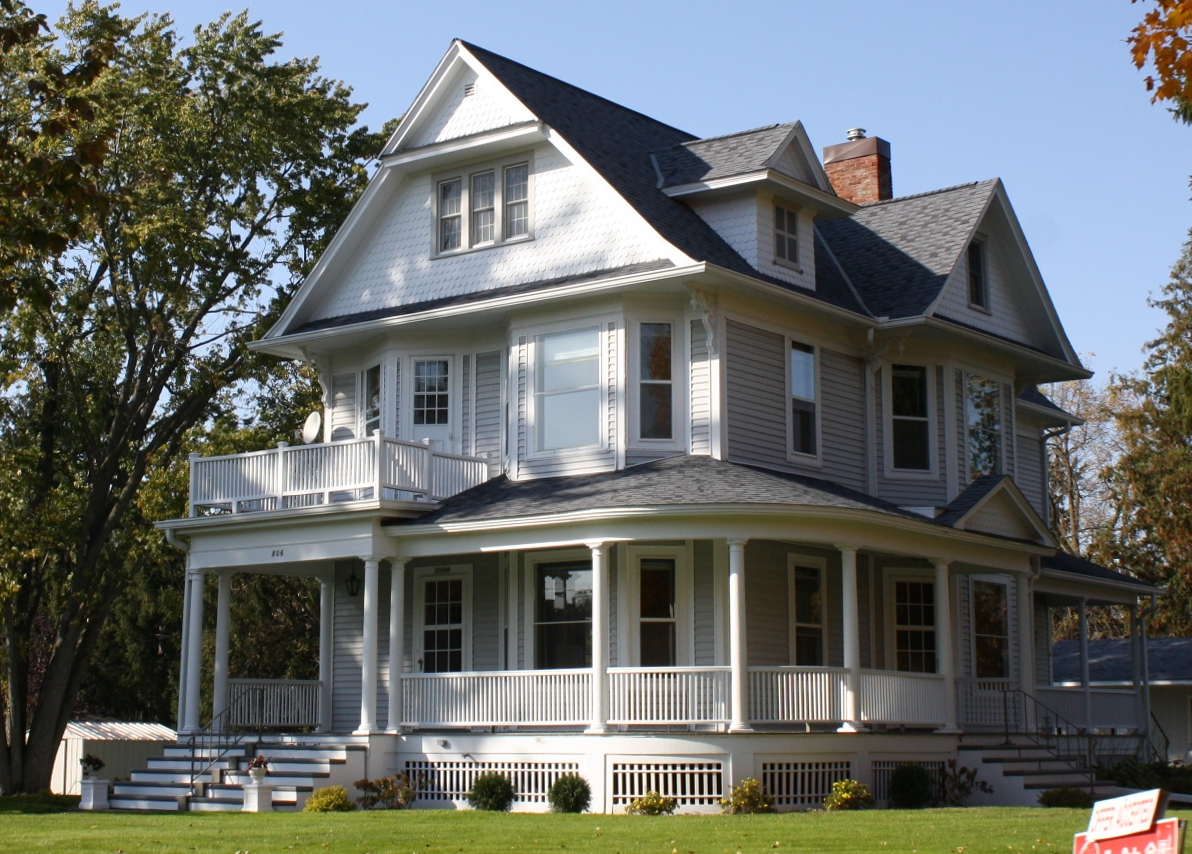

- Location within Wisconsin Location within the United States
- Location: 806 W. Gale Ave., Galesville, Wisconsin
- Coordinates: 44°4′57.89″N 91°21′34.75″W
- Built: 1913
- Architectural style: Queen Anne
- NRHP reference No.: 84003793
- Added to NRHP: September 18, 1984

The Tollef Jensen House is a historic house located in Galesville, Wisconsin. The house was built in 1913; it utilized clapboard walls in a Queen Anne architecture. It was added to the National Register of Historic Places on September 18, 1984.

It is a two-and-a-half-story asymmetrical "rambling" Queen Anne-style house. Its state historical society evaluation states: "The house's massiveness and siting make it stand out as a landmark in the area, and combined with its high integrity and state of preservation, it is the best example of the late Queen Anne style in Galesville."
