= Jensen–Clark House =

- U.S. National Register of Historic Places
- Location within Utah Location within the United States
- Location: 32 E. Main St. (8720 South), Sandy, Utah
- Coordinates: 40°35′35″N 111°53′22″W
- Area: 0.3 acres (0.12 ha)
- Built: c.1921
- Architectural style: Bungalow/craftsman, Prairie School vernacular
- Part of: Sandy Historic District
- MPS: Sandy City MPS
- NRHP reference No.: 00001298
- Added to NRHP: November 6, 2000

The Jensen–Clark House, on Main St. in Sandy, Utah, was built around 1921. It was listed on the National Register of Historic Places in 2000. The listing included three contributing buildings.

The property includes a one-story bungalow house, an infirmary, and a two-car garage. The house's design is influenced by Prairie School style.

Main St. is also known as 8720 South in the larger street grid numbering system of the area. The house more specifically is located at 32 E. Main St., on the southwest corner of Main St.'s intersection with S. 40 East Street, in Sandy. The infirmary building is 12 feet to its west, and is visually connected by an ivy-covered fence with an arched gateway. A driveway on the edge of the property, running south along the far side of the infirmary building and then turning east, behind it, goes to the two-car garage.

It is included in the National Register-listed Sandy Historic District.
