= Arendt Jensen Jr. House =

Historic house in Nevada, United States

- U.S. National Register of Historic Places
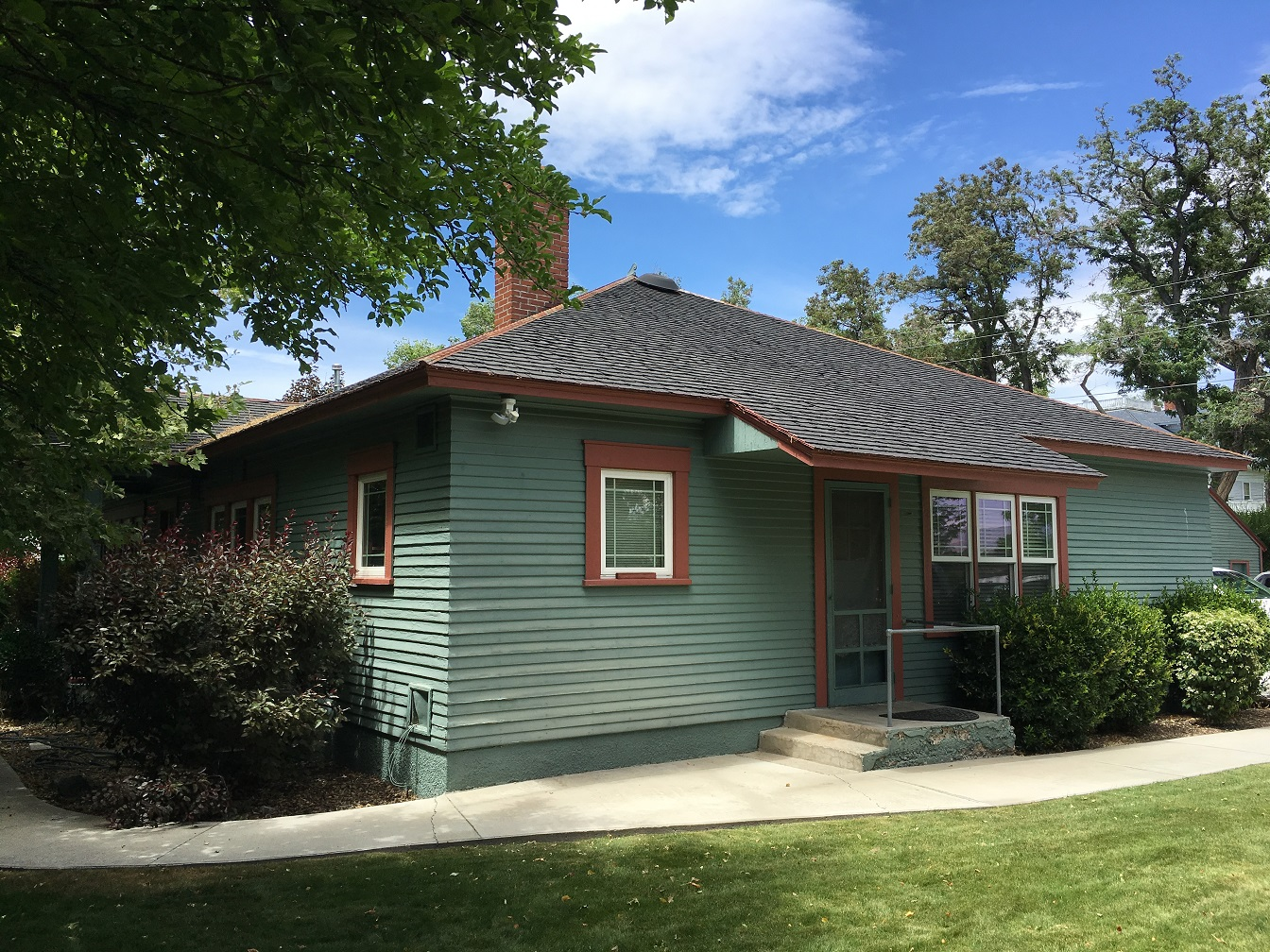

- Location within Nevada Location within the United States
- Location: 1243 A and 1243 B Eddie Street, Gardnerville, Nevada
- Coordinates: 38°56′32″N 119°44′46″W
- Area: less than one acre
- Built: 1932
- Architectural style: Bungalow/Craftsman
- NRHP reference No.: 94001405
- Added to NRHP: December 1, 1994

The Arendt Jensen Jr. House, at 1243 A and 1243 B Eddie St. in Gardnerville, Nevada, is a historic Bungalow/Craftsman-style house that was built in 1932. Also known as the Langlands House, it was listed on the National Register of Historic Places in 1994; the listing included two contributing buildings.

It was deemed significant for its association with Gardnerville's Jensen family and "as a fine example of a craftsman bungalow constructed in the town in the 1930s."

It was home of Arendt Jensen Jr. from 1932 to just 1935, when he died, but home for wife Minnie Jensen until she died in 1991.

== See also ==
- Arendt Jensen House, also NRHP-listed in Gardnerville
