= Chris Jensen Round Barn =

- U.S. National Register of Historic Places
- Location within Illinois Location within the United States
- Nearest city: Lena, Illinois
- Coordinates: 42°23′30″N 89°50′6″W
- Area: less than one acre
- Architectural style: Round Barn
- MPS: Round Barns in Illinois TR
- NRHP reference No.: 84001150
- Added to NRHP: February 23, 1984

The Chris Jensen Round Barn was a historic round barn located at 11723 West Galena Road near Lena, Illinois. The barn was 60 feet (18 m) in diameter and featured a conical roof with a cupola. The barn's livestock stalls were arranged in parallel rows; this configuration was highly unusual among round barns, which typically featured wedge-shaped stalls arranged along the outer circle of the barn.

The barn was listed on the National Register of Historic Places on February 23, 1984. It has since been demolished, though it is still on the Register.
