= Lars and Agnes Jensen House =

Historic house in Utah, United States

- U.S. National Register of Historic Places
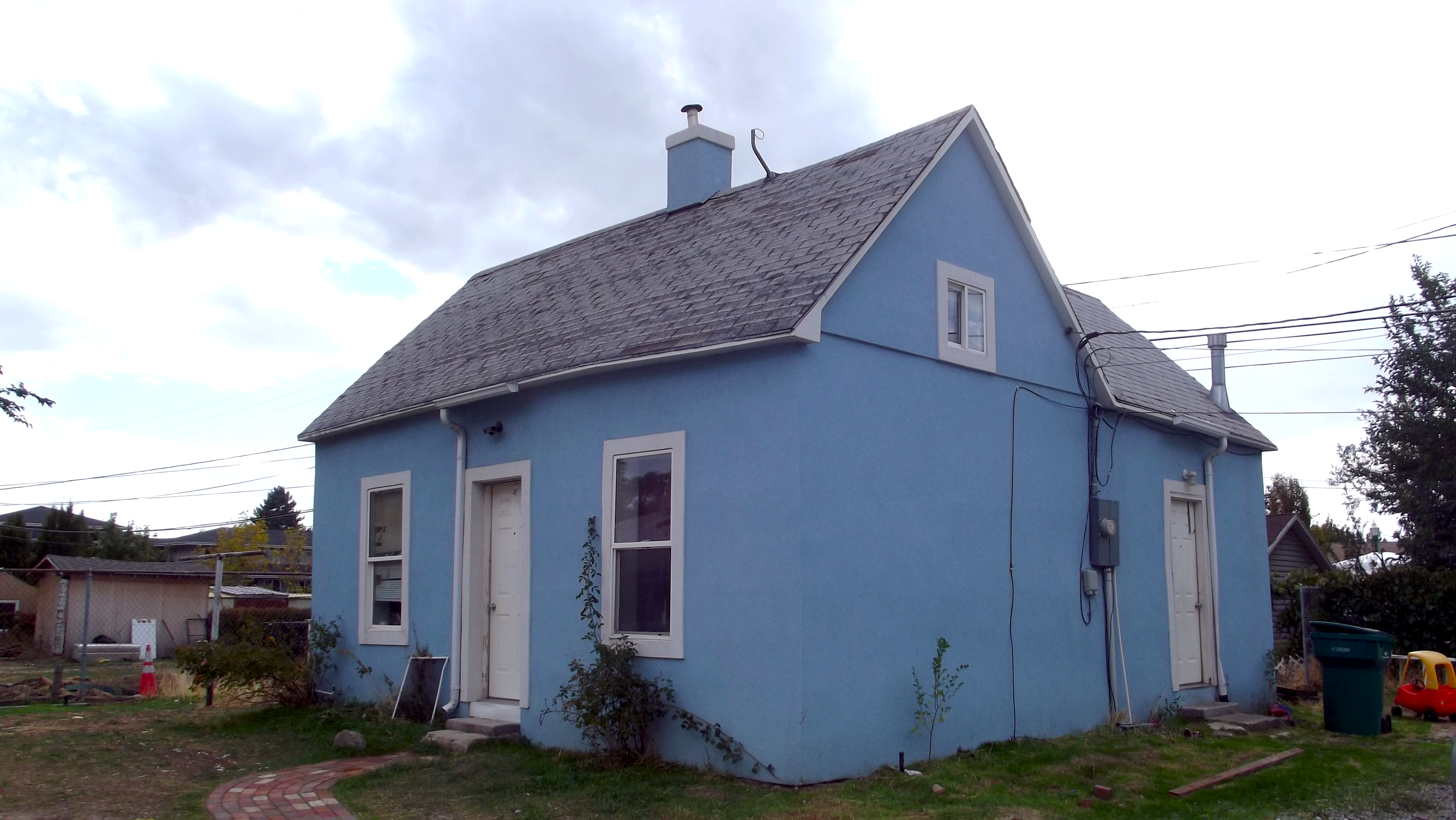

- Location within Utah Location within the United States
- Location: 87 North 800 West, Orem, Utah
- Coordinates: 40°17′55″N 111°42′54″W
- Area: 0.3 acres (0.12 ha)
- Built: 1885
- Architectural style: Classical Revival, Cross wing
- MPS: Orem, Utah MPS
- NRHP reference No.: 99001627
- Added to NRHP: December 30, 1999

The Lars and Agnes Jensen House at 87 North 800 West in Orem, Utah was built in 1885 from hewn logs. It is probably the only remaining log house in Orem.

It was listed on the National Register of Historic Places in 1999.
