= Arendt Jensen House =

Historic house in Nevada, United States

- U.S. National Register of Historic Places
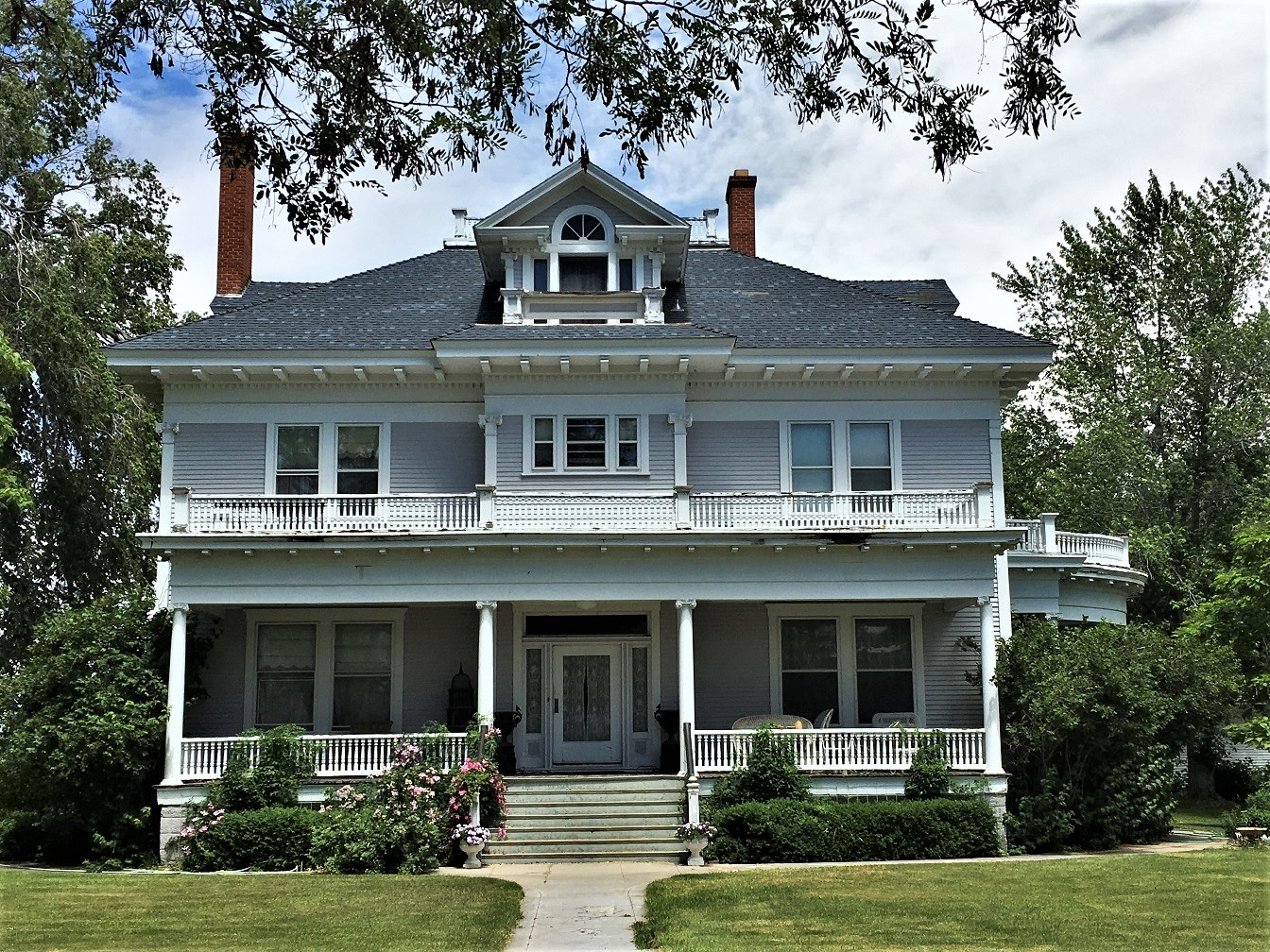

- Location within Nevada Location within the United States
- Location: 1431 Ezell St. Gardnerville, Nevada
- Coordinates: 38°56′31″N 119°44′29″W
- Area: 1.3 acres (0.53 ha)
- Built: c.1910
- Architectural style: Colonial Revival
- NRHP reference No.: 89000126
- Added to NRHP: March 8, 1989

The Arendt Jensen House, at 1431 Ezell St. in Gardnerville, Nevada, is a historic foursquare house—in this case termed a "Denver Square" form—that was built in 1910. It was a home of Danish immigrant Arendt Jensen, a merchant who became prominent in Gardnersville. Also known as the Reid Mansion, it includes Colonial Revival-style ornamentation. It was listed on the National Register of Historic Places in 1989; the listing included two contributing buildings: the second is an accompanying garage.

It was deemed significant for being "unique in the town of Gardnerville, Nevada in its scale and architectural sophistication"; it has been identified to be "one of Gardnerville's 'most outstanding buildings' in a comprehensive architectural survey of the Carson Valley conducted by the Douglas County Planning Department in 1981."

== See also ==
- Arendt Jensen Jr. House, also NRHP-listed in Gardnerville
