= Utah and Salt Lake Canal =

Canal in Salt Lake County, Utah, United States

Coordinates: 40°26′35″N 111°55′23″W

The Utah and Salt Lake Canal is an historic waterway in Salt Lake County, Utah, United States.

== Description ==
The canal was financed wholly by Salt Lake County, and construction lasted from 1872 to 1881. It was built "with only basic tools and contracted manual labor." The settlement that became present-day Riverton was limited to the Jordan River bottoms until this canal was constructed.
