= Jensen Ranch (Selma, California) =

Property in Selma, California, U.S.

The Jensen Ranch, at 8262 Bethel Ave. in Selma, California dates from 1903. It was built by Christen Jensen. It was nominated for listing on the National Register of Historic Places in 1982, with reference number 82004980, but the listing was declined due to owner objection. The nominated property included two contributing buildings on 30 acres (12 ha).
