= Jensen Ranch (Boulder, Wyoming) =

Historic house in Wyoming, United States

- U.S. National Register of Historic Places
- U.S. Historic district
- Location within Wyoming Location within the United States
- Location: Sublette County, Wyoming, USA
- Nearest city: Boulder, Wyoming
- Coordinates: 42°38′22″N 109°31′28″W
- Area: 1.4 acres (0.57 ha)
- Architect: Jensen, Metinus
- Architectural style: Foursquare
- NRHP reference No.: 88000552
- Added to NRHP: May 5, 1988

The Jensen Ranch, 16 miles (26 km) southwest of Boulder, Wyoming, USA, was established by the Danish immigrant Metinus Jensen in 1905. It passed from the family as a working ranch after three generations. The ranch features a 1918 American Foursquare house as its central element, surrounded by accessory ranch buildings.

The Jensen Ranch was established in an unpromising section of Sublette County in sagebrush land. It typifies an early 20th-century ranching operation, that became a successful beef cattle and sheep operation.

Jensen was born on January 14, 1874, in Bramminge, Denmark. He migrated to the United States at the age of nineteen with two brothers. He lived and worked for a time in Nebraska. There he met his wife, a Nebraskan widow named Hannah Percilla Dodd, who already had two children of her own. The Jensens moved to Wyoming in 1900 and eventually had nine more children. he found a job with the Union Pacific Railroad, working at several locations in Wyoming. He obtained a homestead on Muddy Creek in 1905, which had grown to 630.72 acres (255.24 ha) by 1910. The ranch passed to his son Otto in 1945, when Metinus and Hannah moved to Rock Springs. The ranch by then extended to 2,700 acres (1,100 ha) with 350 to 400 cattle.

The ranch was placed on the National Register of Historic Places in 1988.
