= Lone Peak Wilderness =

Wilderness area in Utah and Salt Lake counties in Utah, United States

- IUCN category Ib (wilderness area)
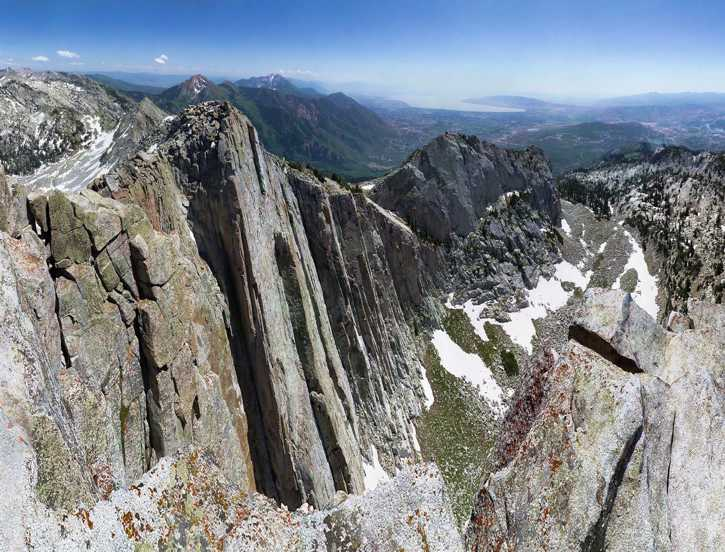
- Summit of Lone Peak

- Location within the United States
- Location: Utah / Salt Lake counties, Utah, USA
- Nearest city: Draper, UT
- Coordinates: 40°32′0″N 111°41′0″W
- Area: 30,088 acres (121.76 km^{2})
- Established: February 24, 1978
- Governing body: U.S. Forest Service

The Lone Peak Wilderness is a 30,088-acre (121.76 km^{2}) wilderness area located within the Uinta and the Wasatch-Cache National Forests in the U.S. state of Utah.

The Lone Peak Wilderness was established in 1978 as part of the Endangered American Wilderness Act and was the only designated wilderness area in Utah until the enactment of the Utah Wilderness Act of 1984. Situated in the central Wasatch Range on the Wasatch-Cache and Uinta National Forests, this wilderness is generally bounded on the north by Little Cottonwood Canyon, on the south by American Fork Canyon, on the west by the Salt Lake and Utah Valleys, and on the east by Twin Peaks. Timpanogos Cave National Monument is adjacent to the south boundary of the wilderness.

== Geology ==
The Lone Peak Wilderness provides a spectacular backdrop for the growing urban areas along the Wasatch Front and is dominated by rugged terrain, narrow canyons, and high peaks, including the Pfeifferhorn, commonly referred to as Little Matterhorn Peak, at 11,326 feet (3,452 m) and Lone Peak at 11,253 feet (3,430 meters). The geologic structure of the area is varied and complex, consisting of granitoid rock masses and several sedimentary formations. The carving of the present alpine topography is due to glaciation, with erosion being the current dominant force in the land sculpturing process. Much of the higher elevation is alpine, characterized by large, open cirque basins and exposed rocky ridges. There are also several small natural and reservoir lakes.

== Vegetation ==
Vegetation includes dense mountain brush mixed with sagebrush and grass. Patches of Douglas fir, subalpine fir, and aspen are common in isolated patches on north-facing slopes. Snow remains in some areas until mid-summer.

== Restrictions ==
To preserve and protect the physical and aesthetic environment, National Forest wildernesses are closed to motor vehicles, motorized equipment, hang gliders, and bicycles. In addition, parts of this wilderness lie within the culinary watershed for Salt Lake County, and special restrictions concerning camping, swimming, and domestic animals apply.

The following acts are prohibited in the Lone Peak Wilderness Area:

- Group sizes exceeding 10 people for overnight use
- Camping within 200 feet (61 m) of lakes, trails, or other sources of water
- Camping for a period of 3 days at an individual site
- Short-cutting a trail switchback, and
- Disposing of garbage, debris, or other waste.

Additionally, open fires are not allowed in the Red Pine Lake, Red Pine Fork, and Maybird Gulch drainages within the wilderness.

== Trails ==
Most trails are rated moderate to severe, with elevations ranging from 5,500 ft 0 in (1,676 m) to more than 11,000 ft 0 in (3,353 m). Trails are easy to follow but may cross extremely rough terrain at high elevations. The use of the area is light to moderate, heaviest on weekends, holidays, and during hunting seasons.

== Weather ==
Summer temperatures can range from near 90 °F (32 °C) in the daytime to below 40 °F (4 °C) at night. Occasional summer thundershowers can be expected.

== See also ==
- Wilderness Act
- National Wilderness Preservation System
- List of U.S. Wilderness Areas
