= Pfeifferhorn =

Mountain in the American state of Utah

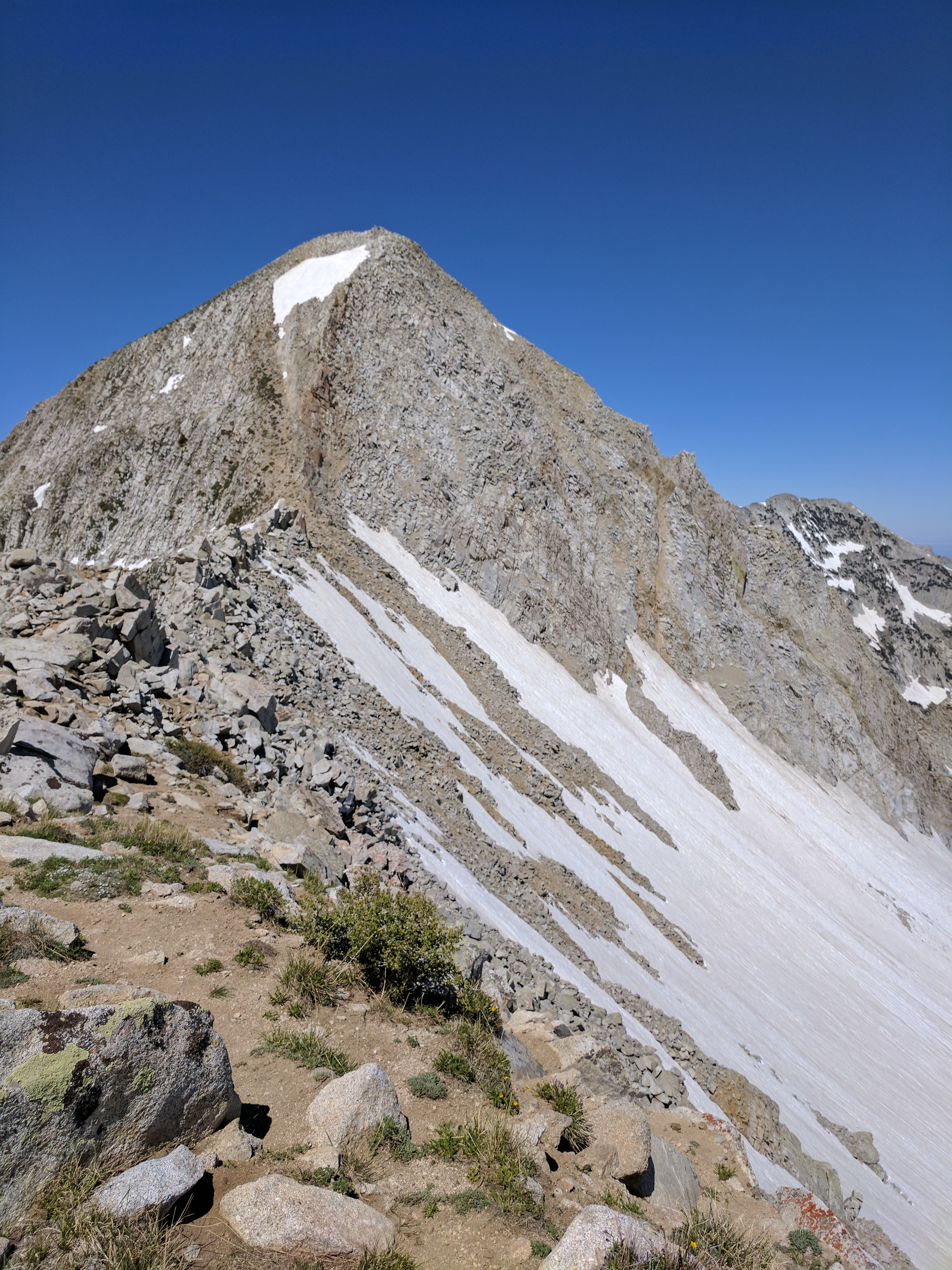
- Pfeifferhorn as seen from the ridge just below and east of the summit

Highest point
- Elevation: 11,326 ft (3,452 m) NAVD 88
- Prominence: 766 ft (233 m)
- Coordinates: 40°32′01″N 111°42′22″W

Geography
- Location within Utah
- Location: Salt Lake / Utah counties, Utah, U.S.
- Parent range: Wasatch Range
- Topo map: USGS Dromedary Peak

The Pfeifferhorn is the 11,326 feet (3,452 m) triangularly-shaped peak located in the most isolated part of the Lone Peak Wilderness Area of the Wasatch Mountains in northern Utah, United States. This rugged Utah mountain, commonly referred to as the Little Matterhorn, is the eighth-highest peak in the Wasatch Range. The summit can be reached by hiking, though some scrambling is required. There are several technical rock climbing routes with the north ridge being the most popular. This summit also makes an excellent winter mountaineering adventure.

== Routes ==
Pfeifferhorn (Via Red Pine Lake) Hiking/Backpacking Details
Summit:	11,326 feet (3,452 m)
Estimated Starting Elevation:	7,700 feet (2,347 m)
Average Total Distance:	9.2 miles (14.8 km) round-trip
Time Needed:	1–2 days
Rating:	Difficult

The easiest and most popular route is the East Ridge via Red Pine Lake trail up Little Cottonwood Canyon. The trail is approximately 3 miles (5 km) to lower Red Pine lake and roughly 1/2 mile (800 m) to the upper Red Pine Lake. From here, climbers proceed southwest up the steep talus slope to the top of the 'false summit'. A well-defined trail is visible here in the absence of snow. Climbers continue west along the ridge through a series of large boulders to a second steep slope. They can either wrap around this slope to the south and switch-back up to the summit (easier) or just continue west until they reach the summit (steep).

Another way to climb Pfeifferhorn is to hike in through Maybird Gulch. A small foot bridge breaks off to the right from the Red Pine Lake trail and will take you into Maybird. You will pass three small lakes nestled under the Hogum Divide with the Pfeifferhorn rising straight ahead. Once past the uppermost lake you will find yourself in a large boulder field (granite talus) which is difficult and slow to cross. At the other side, a steep scramble will take you to the summit base. A loop trip can be made starting at Maybird Gulch, climbing to the peak, then down by way of upper/lower Red Pine lakes or vice versa.

== Climate ==
White Baldy, 11,321 ft (3,451 m), is a peak 1 mile (1.6 km) to the east of Pfeifferhorn. White Baldy has a subalpine climate (Köppen Dfc). There is no weather station at the summit, but this climate table contains interpolated data for an area around the summit

Climate data for White Baldy 40.5325 N, 111.6867 W, Elevation: 10,692 ft (3,259 m) (1991–2020 normals)
Month	Jan	Feb	Mar	Apr	May	Jun	Jul	Aug	Sep	Oct	Nov	Dec	Year
Mean daily maximum °F (°C)	27.2 (−2.7)	27.3 (−2.6)	32.1 (0.1)	37.4 (3.0)	47.1 (8.4)	58.8 (14.9)	68.2 (20.1)	66.7 (19.3)	57.7 (14.3)	44.6 (7.0)	33.5 (0.8)	26.9 (−2.8)	44.0 (6.7)
Daily mean °F (°C)	18.4 (−7.6)	17.5 (−8.1)	21.9 (−5.6)	26.7 (−2.9)	35.9 (2.2)	46.8 (8.2)	56.0 (13.3)	54.8 (12.7)	46.2 (7.9)	34.4 (1.3)	24.4 (−4.2)	18.1 (−7.7)	33.4 (0.8)
Mean daily minimum °F (°C)	9.5 (−12.5)	7.8 (−13.4)	11.8 (−11.2)	16.0 (−8.9)	24.8 (−4.0)	34.8 (1.6)	43.8 (6.6)	43.0 (6.1)	34.8 (1.6)	24.1 (−4.4)	15.4 (−9.2)	9.3 (−12.6)	22.9 (−5.0)
Average precipitation inches (mm)	7.96 (202)	6.51 (165)	6.60 (168)	6.58 (167)	4.83 (123)	2.01 (51)	1.31 (33)	2.04 (52)	3.26 (83)	4.80 (122)	6.06 (154)	6.74 (171)	58.7 (1,491)
Source: PRISM Climate Group

== Gallery ==
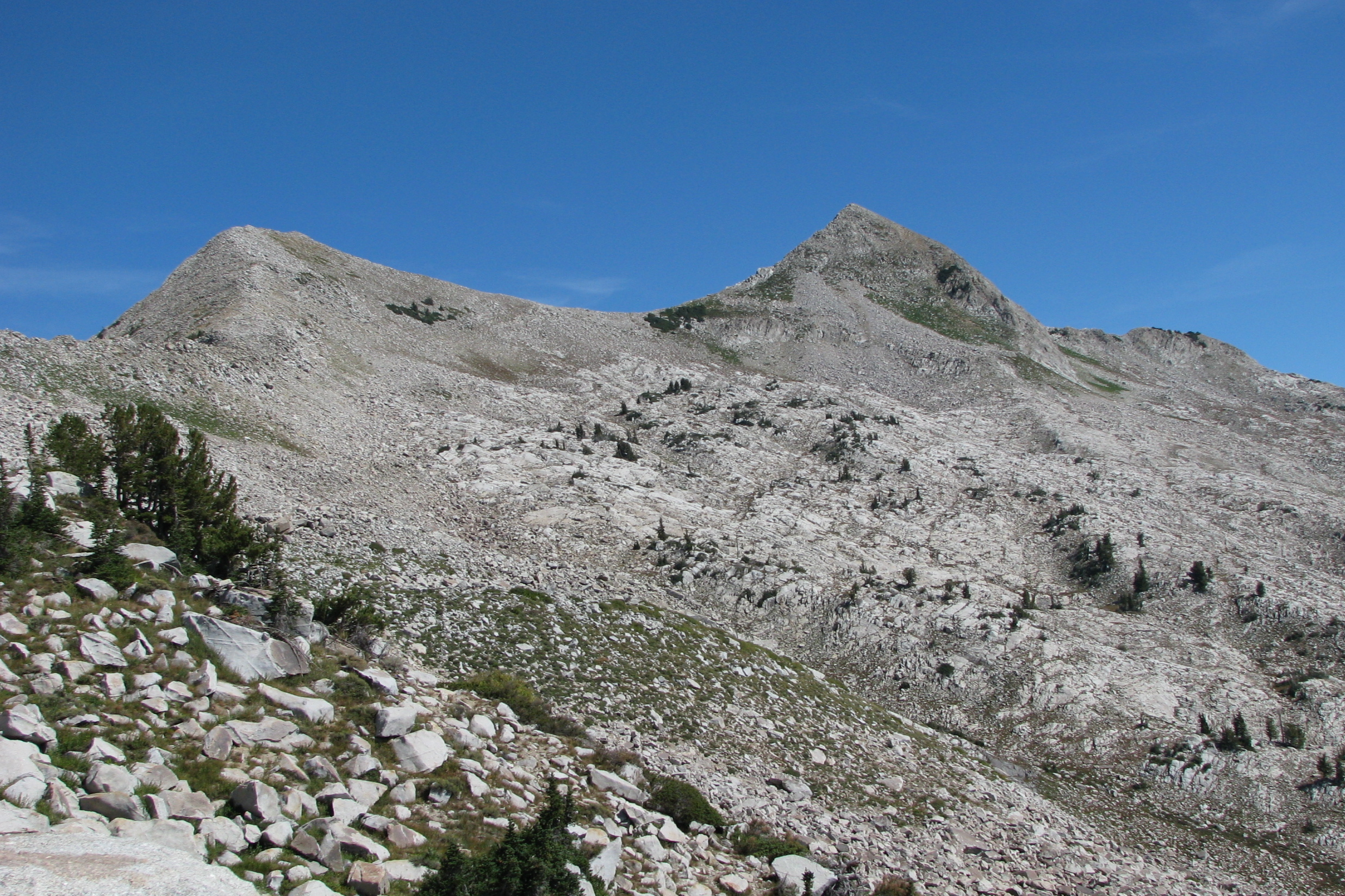
Pfeifferhorn as seen from the south side of the Lone Peak Ridge above the Dry Creek trail

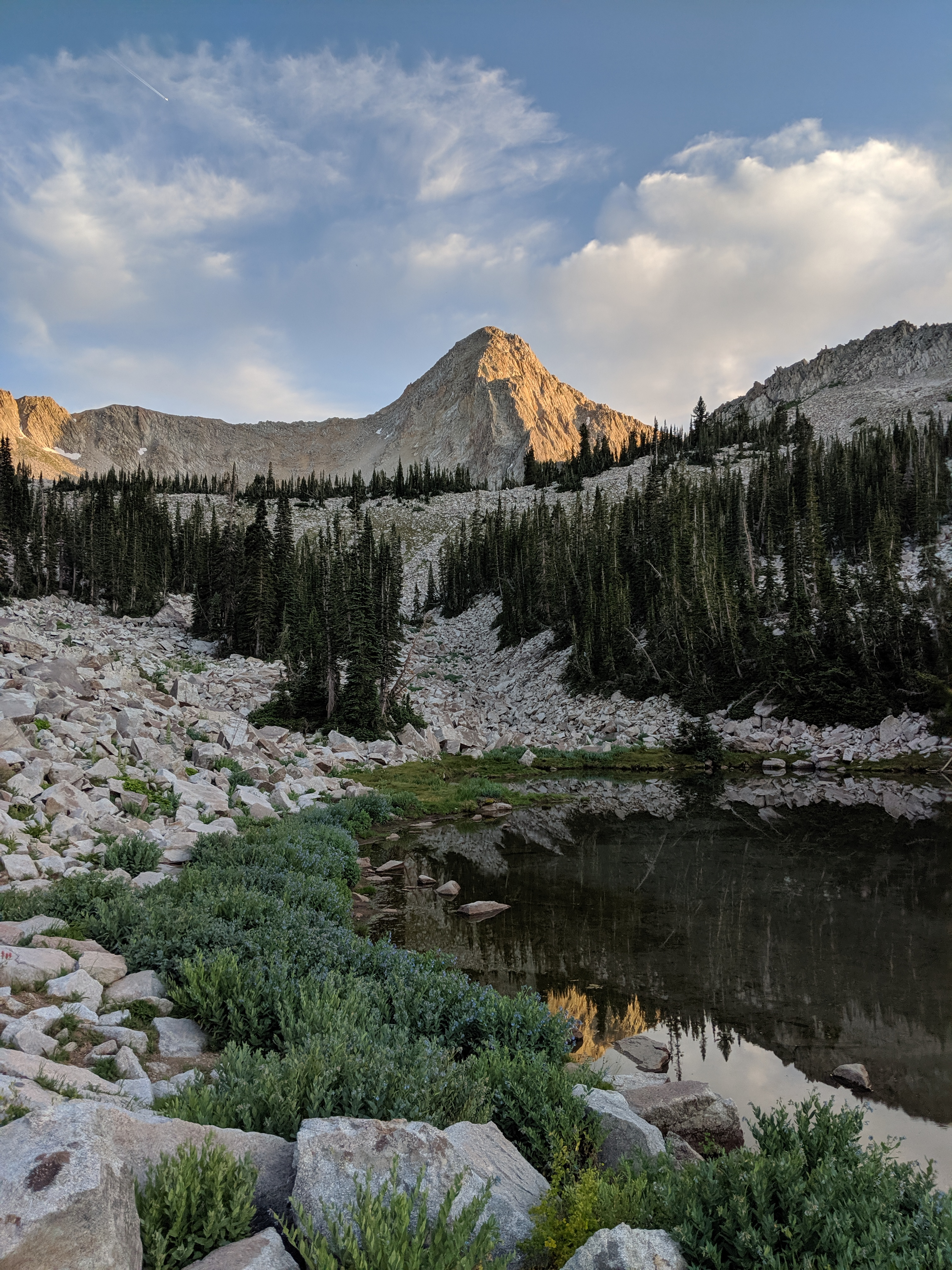
Pfeifferhorn from Maybird Gulch

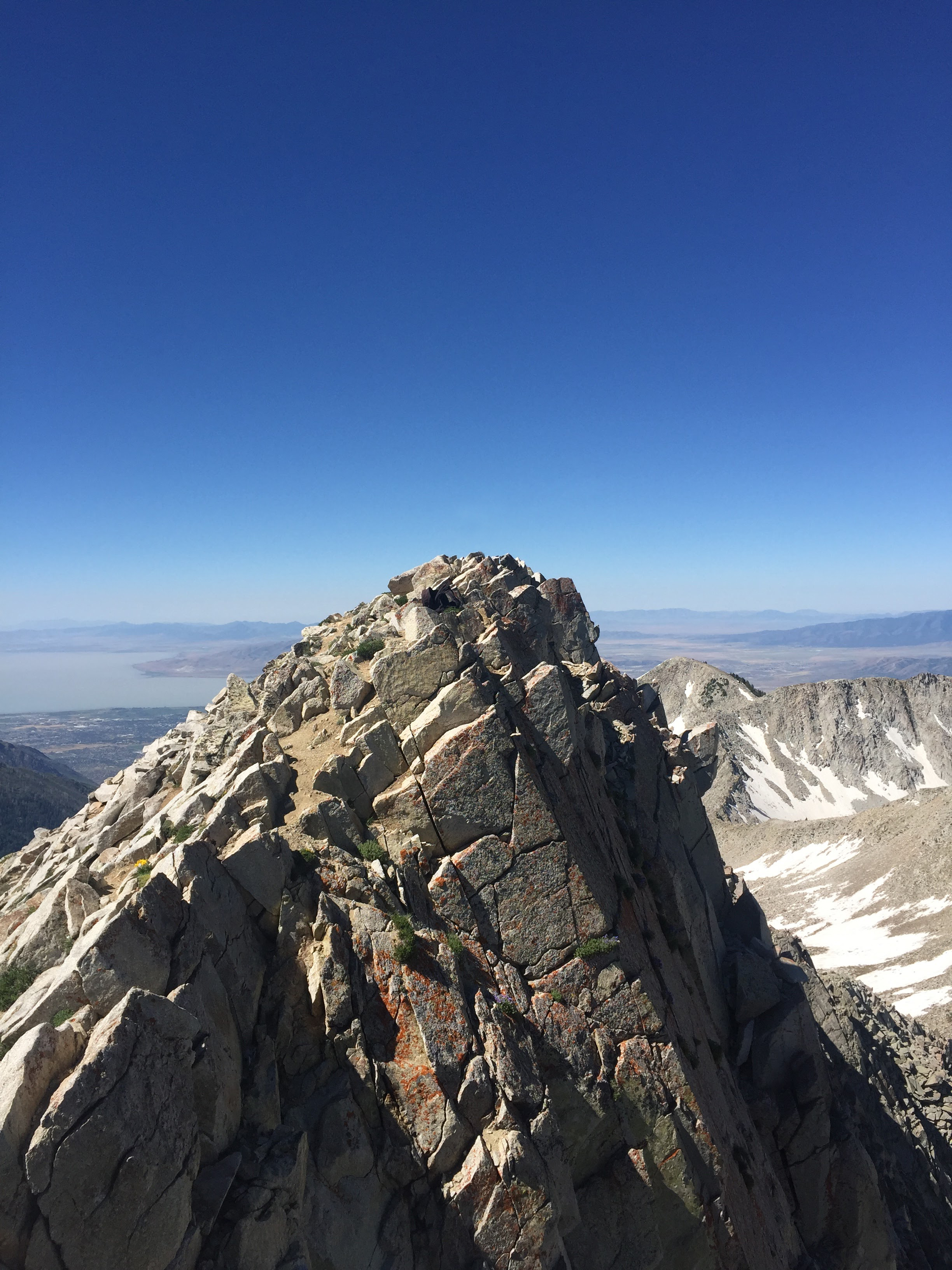
Pfeifferhorn summit

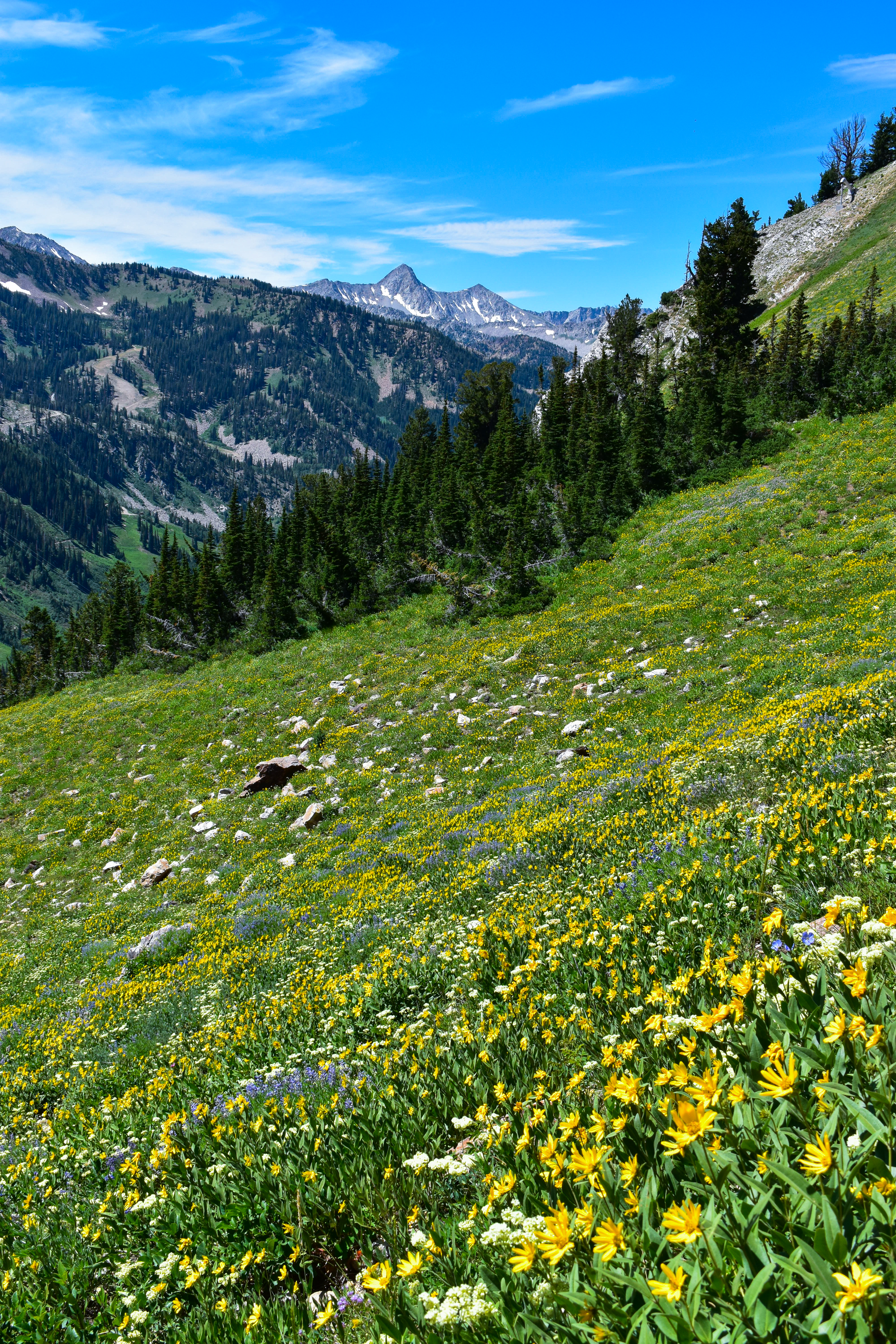
Pfeifferhorn in the distance from Mt. Superior

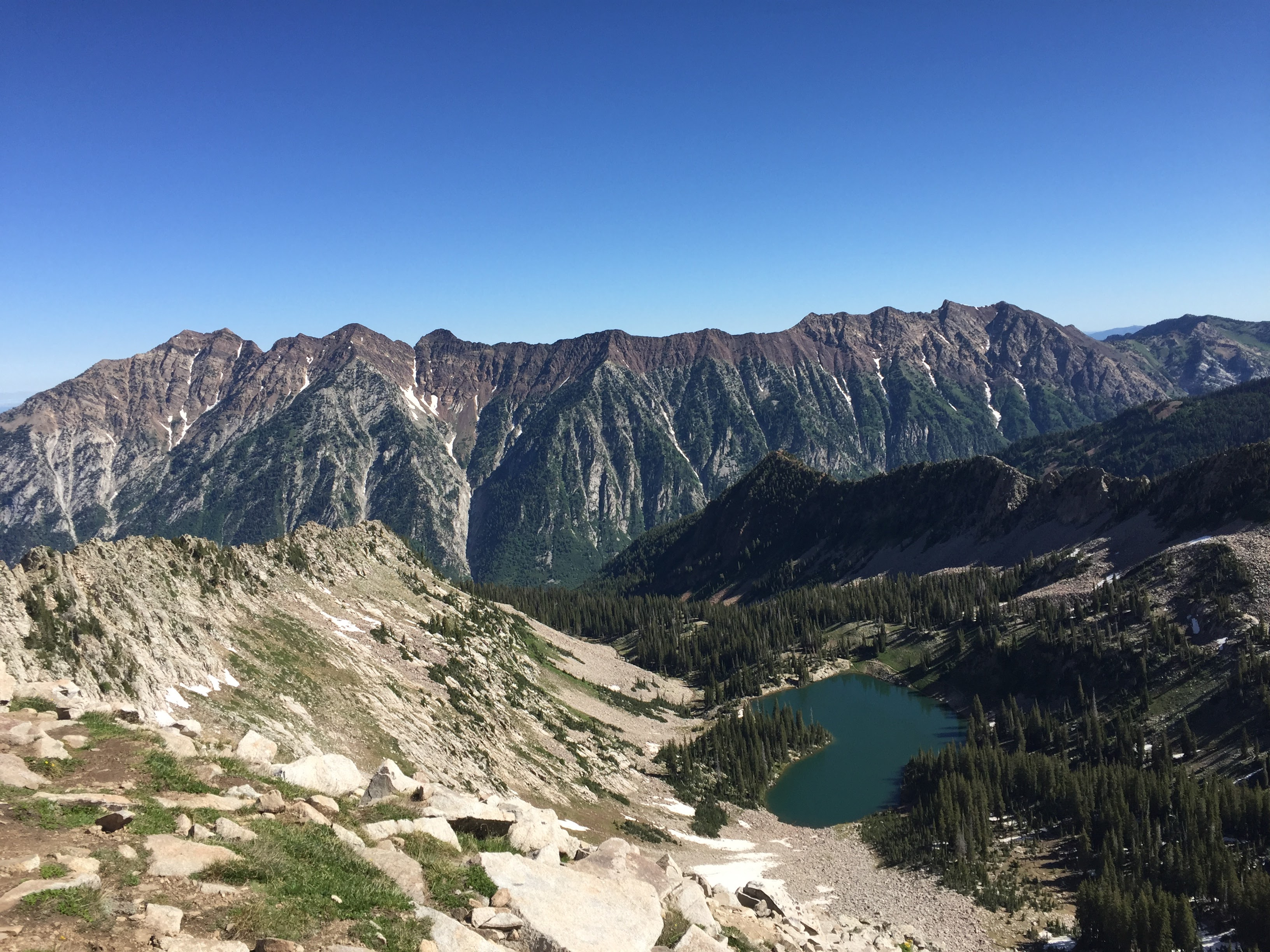
Little Cottonwood ridge line and Red Pine lake from ridge east of the Pfeifferhorn which is the easiest route to the summit.

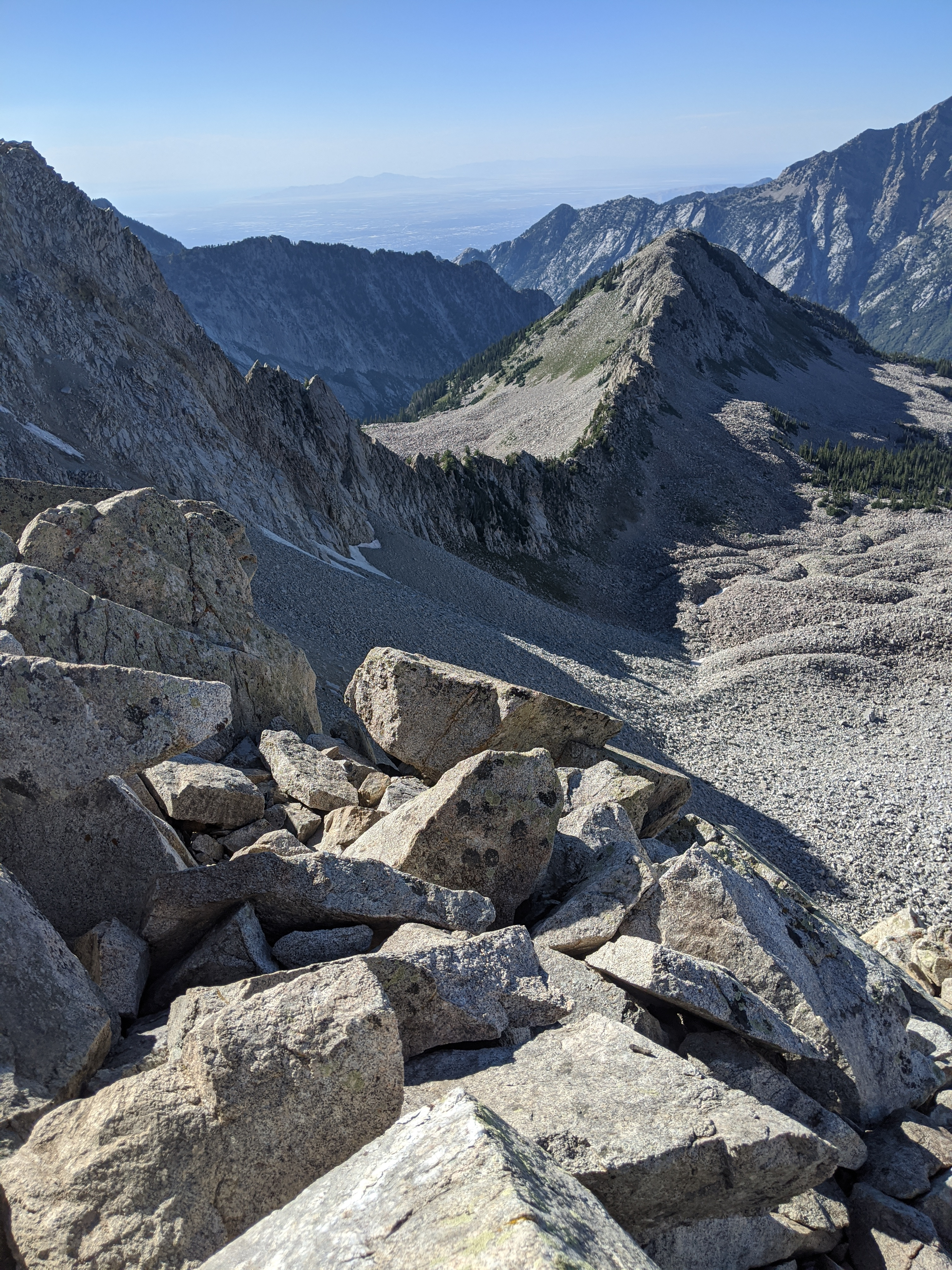
North ridge of Pfeifferhorn

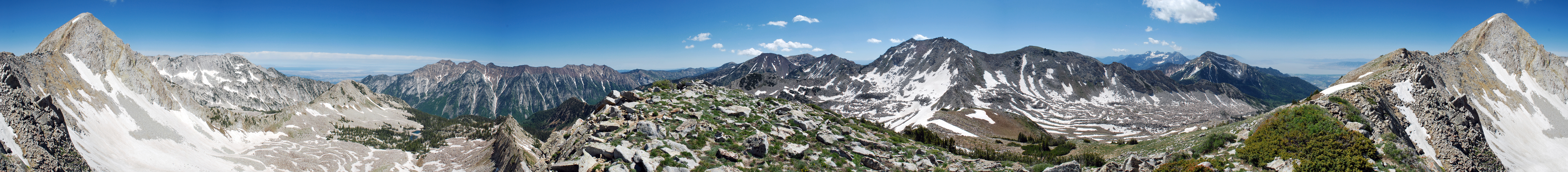
Pfeifferhorn panorama
