= Mount Superior =

Mountain in the American state of Utah

Superior
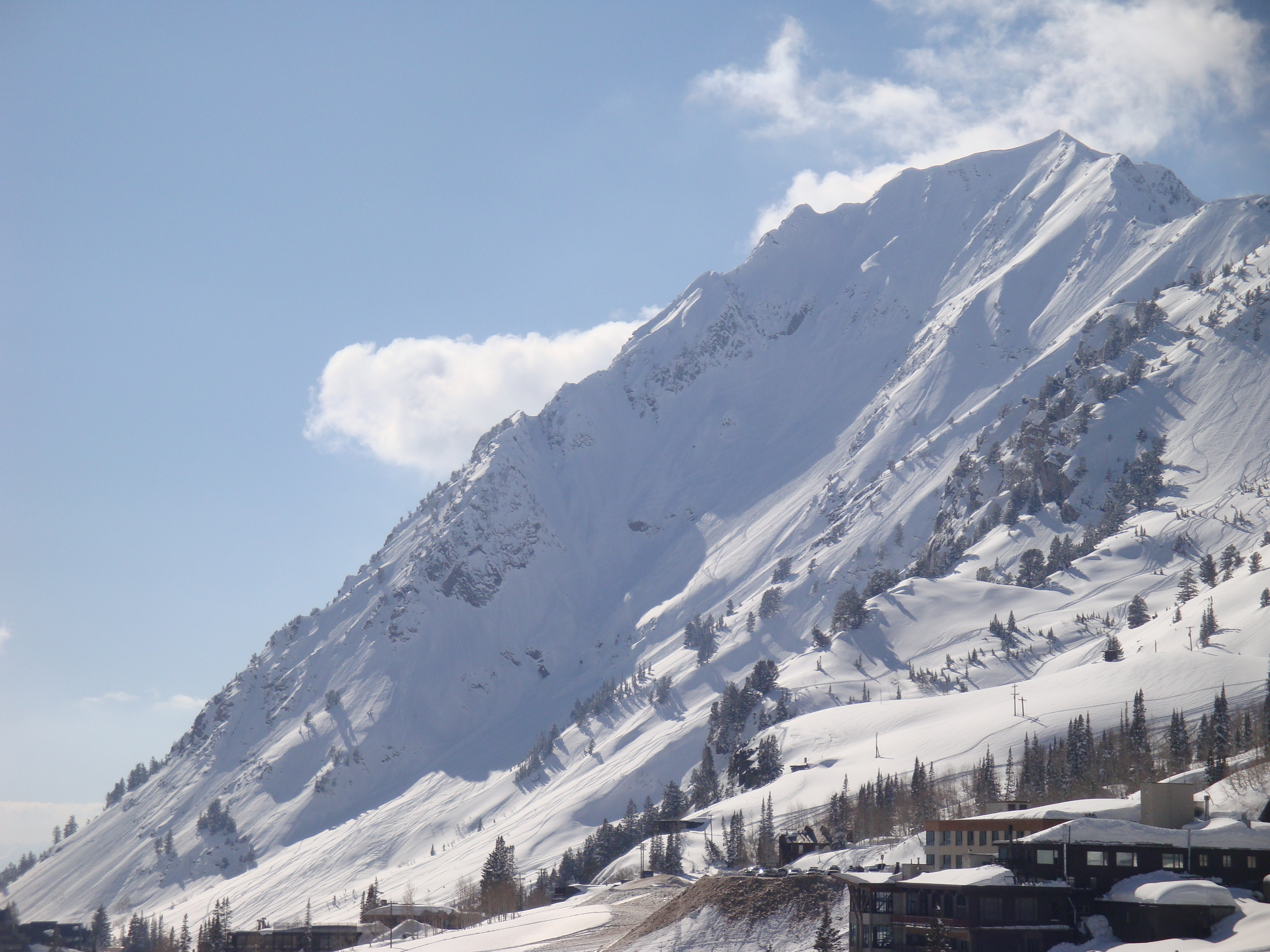
- Mt. Superior as seen from Little Cottonwood, April 2009

Highest point
- Elevation: 11,045 ft (3,367 m) NAVD 88
- Coordinates: 40°35′32″N 111°40′01″W

Geography
- Location within Utah Location within the United States
- Location: Salt Lake County, Utah; United States
- Parent range: Wasatch Range
- Topo map: USGS Dromedary Peak

Mount Superior (also known as Superior Peak) is an 11,045 feet (3,367 m) mountain peak in the Uinta-Wasatch-Cache National Forest in Salt Lake County, Utah, United States.

With prominent visibility from Utah State Route 210 in Little Cottonwood Canyon, and being only 35 minutes from downtown Salt Lake City, it is a popular hiking, climbing, and skiing destination.

== Routes ==
There are many ways to access the summit of Mount Superior, with the two most popular options being via the Cardiff Pass and South Ridge trails.

=== Cardiff Pass ===
Summit:	11,045 feet (3,367 m)
Estimated Starting Elevation:	8,675 feet (2,644 m)
Elevation Gain	2,370 feet (722 m)
Average Total Distance:	4.8 Miles
Rating:	Difficult

The Cardiff Pass trail follows a well-maintained route starting in the town of Alta until it reaches Cardiff Pass. Once the pass has been reached, it skirts around Cardiff Peak along a ridge line to the summit.

=== South Ridge ===
The summit can also be reached via the South Ridge. Considered a 5th class scramble or rock climb, the ascent can be made, depending on ones climbing experience and conditions, free solo or with ropes and other rock climbing equipment.

== Skiing and Snowboarding ==
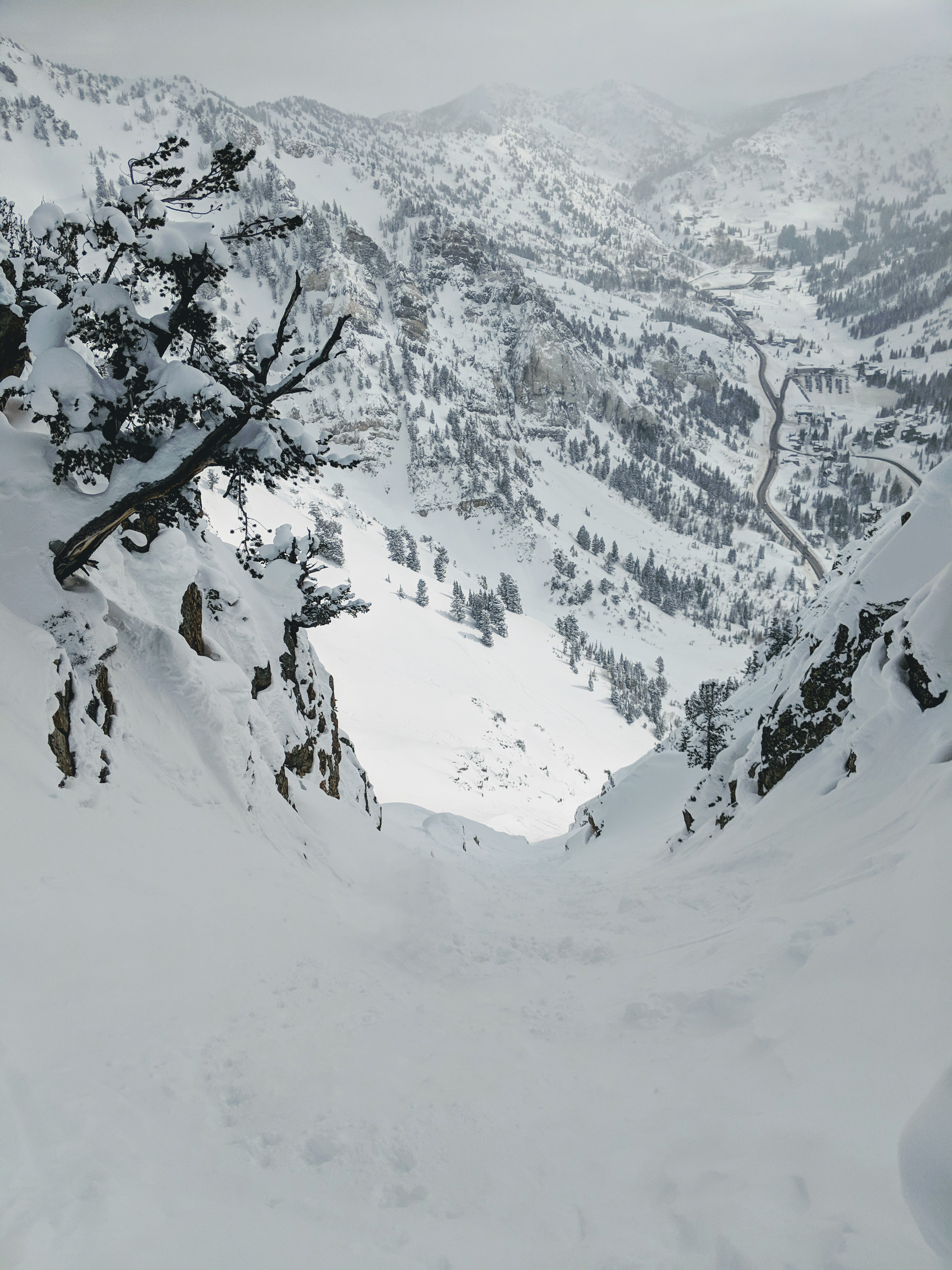
Looking down Suicide Chute with Utah State Route 210 below, February 2019

There are various skiing and snowboarding lines that descend Mount Superior on all aspects.

=== South Face ===
This descent is included in Fifty Classic Ski Descents of North America and is rated S4 with slopes 35–45° with dangerous fall potential and a few terrain obstacles. It is also a part of The Chuting Gallery: A Guide to Steep Skiing in the Wasatch Mountains, a skiing guidebook for various Wasatch Range chutes.

=== Suicide Chute or Shane's Chute ===
An obvious and prominent east-facing chute seen from Little Cottonwood Canyon, this line has been known by a few names, but is most commonly referenced as Suicide Chute. This descent has slopes upwards of 40° and is rated S4. The high walls of the chute shield the snowpack from direct sunlight, and it is not uncommon for it to remain skiable well into June.
