= Endangered American Wilderness Act of 1978 =

- Long title: An act to designate certain endangered public lands for preservation as wilderness, and for other purposes.
- Enacted by: the 95th United States Congress
- Effective: February 24, 1978

Citations
- Public law: 95-237

Legislative history
- Introduced in the House as H.R. 3454 by Morris Udall (D–AZ) on February 9, 1977; Committee consideration by United States House Committee on Natural Resources Senate Committee for Energy and Natural Resources; Passed the House on September 12, 1977; Passed the Senate on October 27, 1977 with changes; Signed into law by President Jimmy Carter on February 24, 1978

Endangered American Wilderness Act (Public Law 95-237) is a Federal law, enacted in 1978, that established ten new designated Wilderness Areas in the National Forests of several Western states. Sponsored by Arizona Democrat Morris Udall, the law added approximately 400,000 acres (160,000 ha) of wilderness in California, Utah, New Mexico, and Wyoming, to the National Wilderness Preservation System. Other sections of the law established three new Wilderness Areas in Oregon and added additional acreage to two existing areas, and ordered the creation of a committee to develop a management plan for 330,000 acres of public land along the Salmon River in Idaho known as the Gospel-Hump area.

== Background ==
Responding to a heightened public interest in conservation and an increased threat to public lands by development, and other intrusive or consumptive activities, such as logging, Congress passed the Wilderness Act of 1964, Public Law 88-577 (16 U.S.C. 1131–1136) on September 3, 1964. Created, in the words of the law, “to secure for the American people of present and future generations the benefits of an enduring resource of wilderness,” the law created the National Wilderness Preservation System and a set of criteria and administrative processes by which natural areas could be added to this system.

Under this new law, proposed areas on U.S. Forest Service, National Park Service, and U.S. Fish and Wildlife Service could be designated as Wilderness Areas, special reserves protected from human encroachment and development. Within these areas, unless specially exempted, Congress mandated that there “shall be no commercial enterprise and no permanent road within any wilderness area designated by this Act and, except as necessary to meet minimum requirements for the administration of the area...there shall be no temporary road, no use of motor vehicles, motorized equipment or motorboats, no landing of aircraft, no other form of mechanical transport, and no structure or installation within any such area.” To be kept in as close to a pristine natural state as possible, these areas would only be open to hikers and backpackers, who would be expected to follow low-impact, “Leave No Trace” camping practices.

== Legislative history ==
What would become Public Law 95-237 was not the first bill introduced in 1977 that used the name Endangered American Wilderness Act. Several earlier bills, including H.R. 1207 (95th), sponsored by Robert Roe, (D) the Representative for New Jersey's 8th congressional district, and two resolutions, H.R. 14524 (94th) and H.R. 14774 (94th), both sponsored by Morris Udall, (D), the representative for Arizona's 2nd congressional district, were allowed to die in committee. Undaunted, Udall introduced a version of the bill on February 9, 1977, which moved to the House National Resources Committee as H.R. 3454 (95th). Passing the committee, the bill was approved by the full House on September 12, 1977, and sent to the Senate. After passing the Senate Committee on Energy and Natural Resources, the bill was approved, with changes, on October 20, 1977, and returned to the House for approval. Once granted, the bill was signed into law on February 24, 1978, by President Jimmy Carter, becoming Public Law 95-237.

== Section I ==
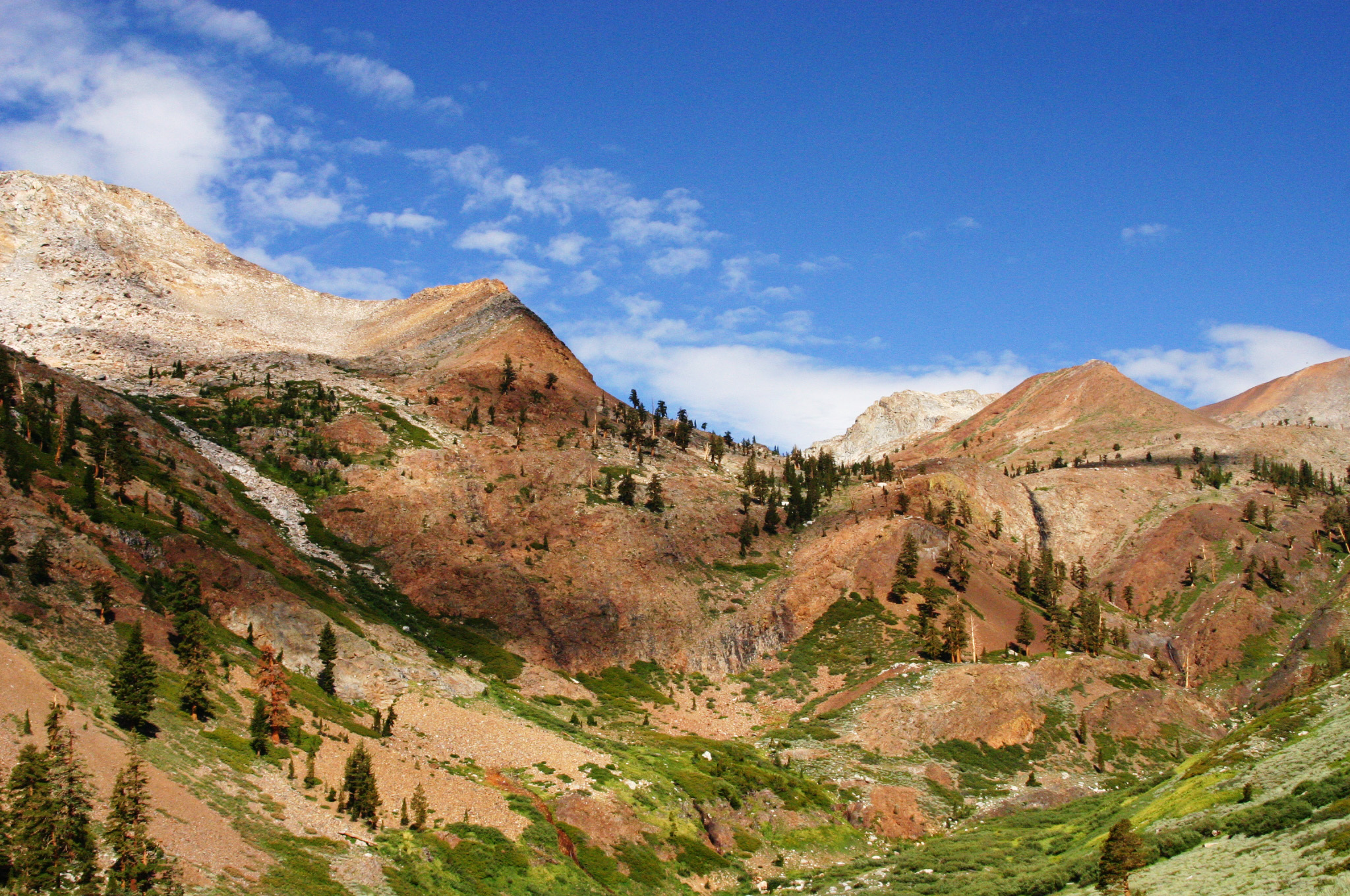
Farewell Gap in the Goldern Trout Wilderness, Inyo and Sequoia National Forests

Noting that “many areas of undeveloped national forest land exhibit outstanding natural characteristics giving them high value as wilderness,” and that “these and other undeveloped national forest lands exhibiting wilderness values are immediately threatened by pressures of a growing and more mobile population, large-scale industrial and economic growth, and development and uses inconsistent with the protection, maintenance, restoration, and enhancement of their wilderness character,” Title I of the law established a number of new protected Wilderness Areas on National Forest lands in Wyoming, California, Utah, and New Mexico.

== Section II ==
Section II of the law listed the new Wilderness Areas to be established, along with their total acreage and the parent Forest of which they were part. These included:

- the 56,430 acre Pusch Ridge Wilderness in the Coronado National Forest
- the 306,000 acre Golden Trout Wilderness in the Inyo and Sequoia National Forests
- the 21,250 acre Santa Lucia Wilderness in the Los Padres National Forest
- the 61,000 acre Ventana Wilderness in the Los Padres National Forest
- the 74,450 acre Hunter-Fryingpan Wilderness in the White River National Forest
- the 30,930 acre Manzano Mountain Wilderness in the Cibola National Forest
- the 50,000 acre Chama River Canyon Wilderness in the Santa Fe and Carson National Forests
- the 29,567 acre Lone Peak Wilderness in the Wasatch and Uinta National Forests
- the 14,904 acre Savage Run Wilderness in the Medicine Bow National Forest
- the 28,440 acre Welcome Creek Wilderness in the Lolo National Forest

== The Oregon Omnibus Wilderness Act of 1978 ==
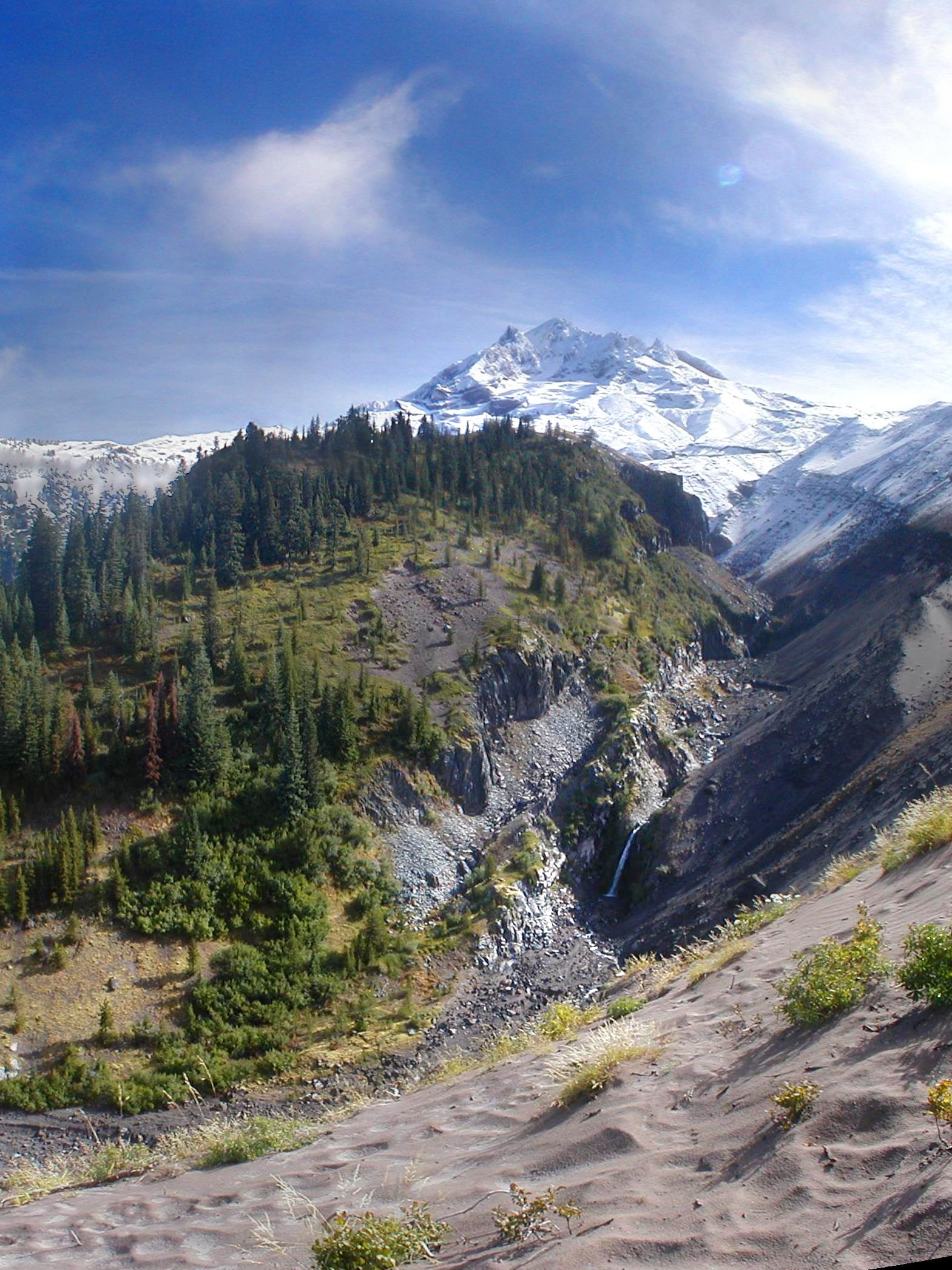
The Sandy River in the Mount Hood Wilderness

Section III of Title One, also known as the Oregon Omnibus Wilderness Act of 1978, added three new Wilderness Areas to the National Wilderness Preservation System and added additional lands to two existing Wilderness Areas. The areas established included:

- the 92,000 acre Kalmiopsis Wilderness in the Siskiyou National Forest
- the 36,700 acre Wild Rogue Wilderness in the Siskiyou National Forest
- the 180,000 acre Wenaha-Tucannon Wilderness in the Umatilla National Forest

Additional grants of land to existing Wilderness Areas included:

- 33,000 acres for the Mount Hood Wilderness in the Mount Hood National Forest
- 45,400 acres for the Three Sisters Wilderness in the Willamette National Forest

== Section IV ==
This section of the law deals with the disposition of a 350,000-acre area in Idaho known as the Gospel-Hump area, located along the Salmon River and including the titular mountains. The law approved the establishment of a 206,000-acre area, which had been previously proposed as a Wilderness Area, as the Gospel-Hump Wilderness. This section also ordered the Secretary of Agriculture, as responsible official for the Forest Service, to assemble a committee charged with the creation of a multipurpose resource development plan that would make recommendations for the use of two sections near the forest, a 92,000-acre “Management Area” and a 45,000-acre “Development Area,” both of which consisted of land-less roads contiguous with the Wilderness. This is to have seven members: two members from the timber industry who purchase timber from the Nezperce National Forest, two members from organizations who are actively engaged in seeking the preservation of wilderness lands, and three members from the general public who otherwise have a significant interest in the resources and management of the Gospel-Hump Area. The completed management plan was then to be submitted to the Secretary of Agriculture, along with the results of a comprehensive state and federal research program into local fish and game populations also ordered and funded in this bill.

== Section V ==
This section noted that the Wilderness Areas established in the law should consider the date of the passage of the law as the effective date of their creation, and the date at which the strictures of the Wilderness Area designation went into effect, with the exception of the Gospel-Hump Area, whose effective date of creation was extended five years into the future, owing to the need to draw up and implement the previously discussed multipurpose development plan.

== Section VI ==
The final section of the law ordered that maps and legal descriptions of the newly established Wilderness Areas should be delivered to the House Committee on Interior and Insular Affairs and the Senate Committee on Energy and Natural Resources, and that the boundaries and descriptions submitted should have the “same force and effect as if included in this Act.”

== See also ==
- Wilderness Act of 1964
