= Wasatch Range =

Sub-range of the Rocky Mountains in the western United States

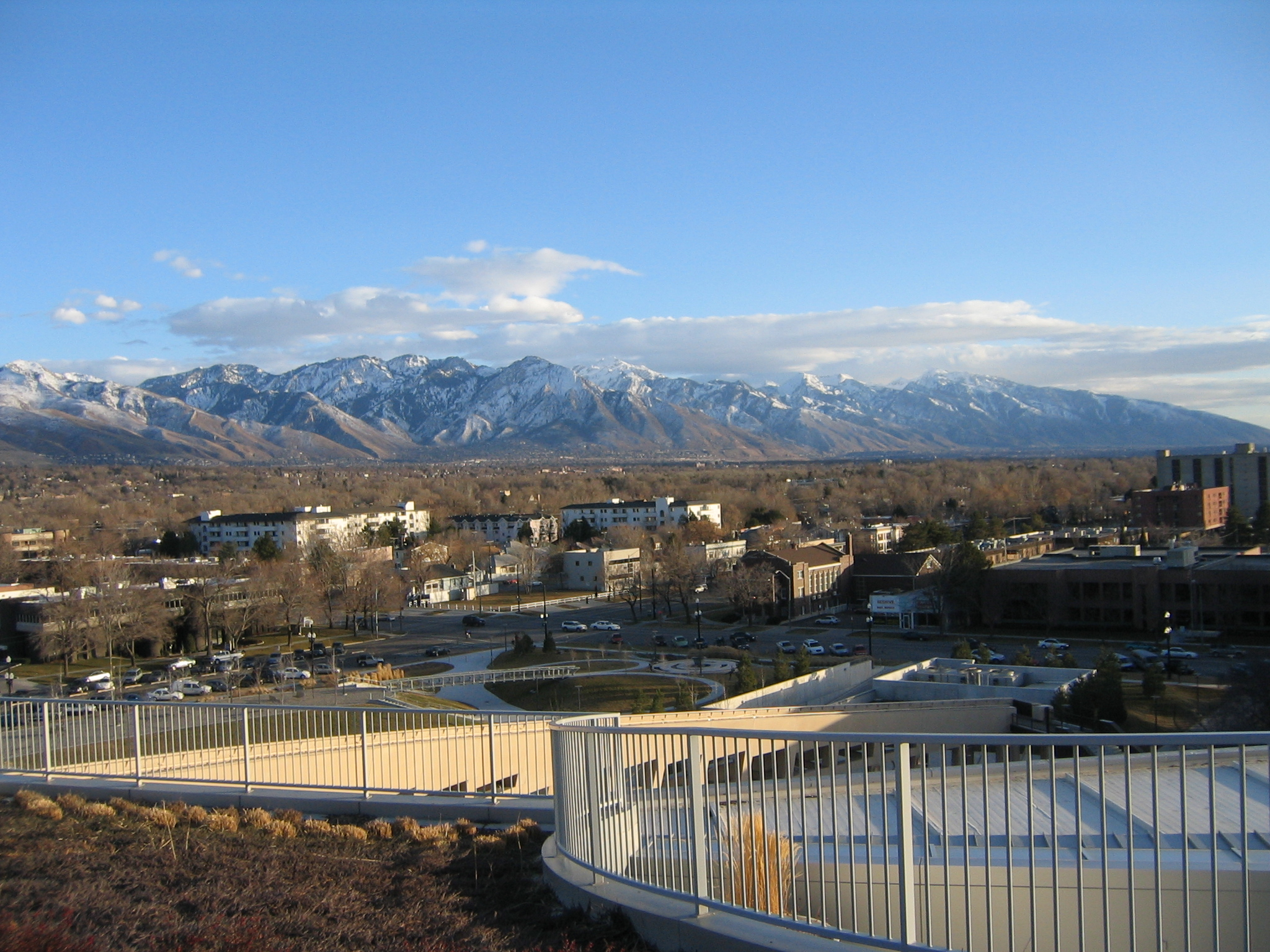
- View of the Wasatch Range from the Salt Lake City Public Library, January 2006

Highest point
- Peak: Mount Nebo
- Elevation: 11,928 ft (3,636 m)

Geography
- Location within Utah
- Country: United States
- States: Utah; Idaho
- Range coordinates: 40°29′24″N 111°41′46″W
- Parent range: Rocky Mountains

The Wasatch Range (/ˈwɑːsætʃ/ WAH-satch) or Wasatch Mountains is a mountain range in the western United States that runs about 160 miles (260 km) from the Utah–Idaho border south to central Utah. It is the western edge of the greater Rocky Mountains, and the eastern edge of the Great Basin region. The northern extension of the Wasatch Range, the Bear River Mountains, extends just into Idaho, constituting all of the Wasatch Range in that state.

In the language of the native Ute people, wasatch means "mountain pass" or "low pass over high range." According to William Bright, the mountains were named for a Shoshoni leader who was named with the Shoshoni term wasattsi, meaning "blue heron". In 1926, Cecil Alter quoted Henry Gannett from 1902, who said that the word meant "land of many waters," then posited, "the word is a common one among the Shoshones, and is given to a berry basket" carried by women.

== Overview ==
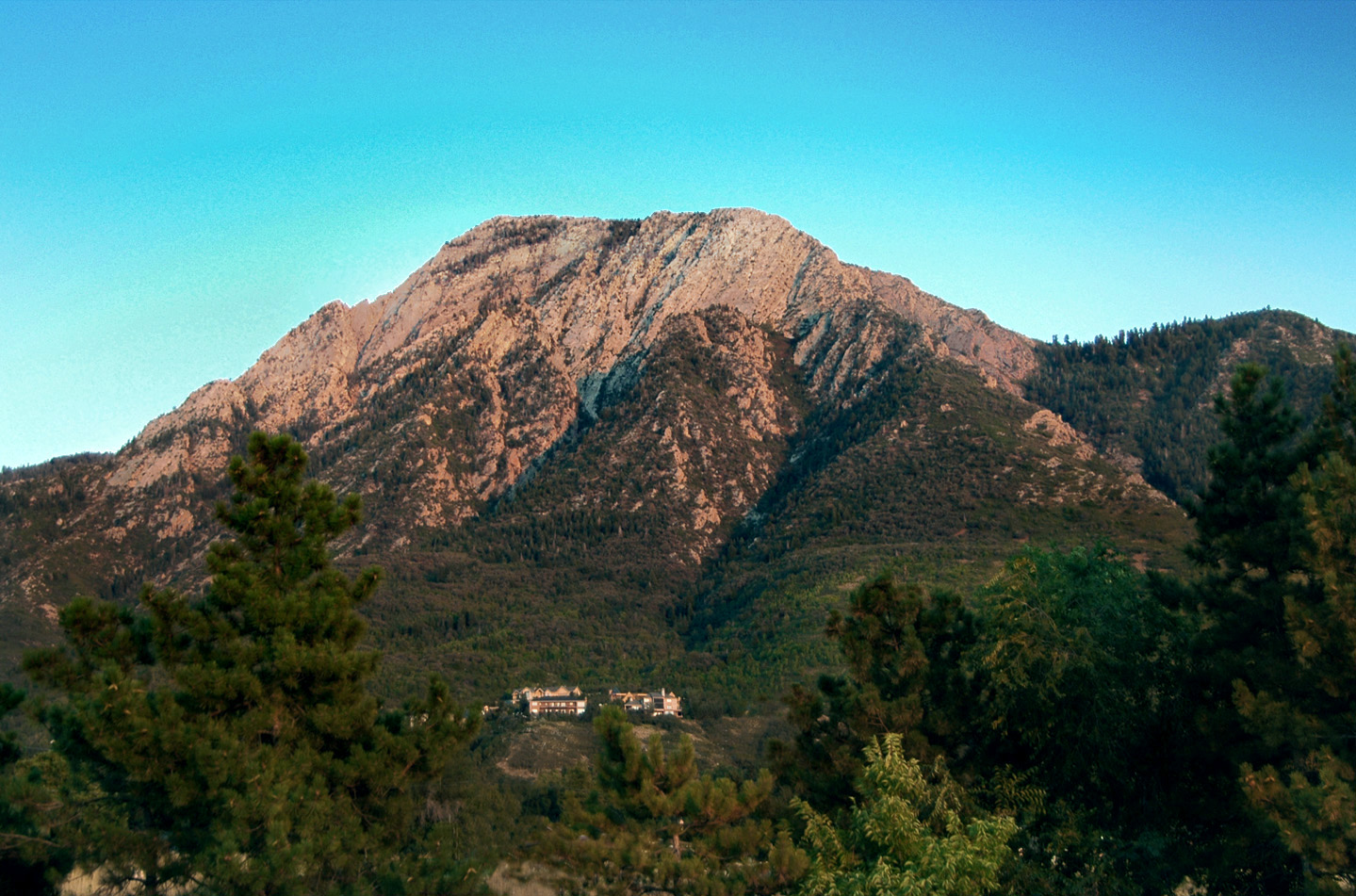
Mount Olympus, a prominent and recognizable mountain visible from much of the Salt Lake Valley, August 2005

Since the earliest days of European settlement, most of Utah's population has chosen to settle along the range's western front, where numerous rivers exit the mountains. For early settlers, the mountains were a vital source of water, timber, and granite. Today, 85% of Utah's population lives within 15 miles (24 km) of the Wasatch Range, mainly in the valleys just to the west. This westside concentration is known as the Wasatch Front and has a population just shy of 3 million. Salt Lake City lies between the Wasatch Range and the Great Salt Lake.

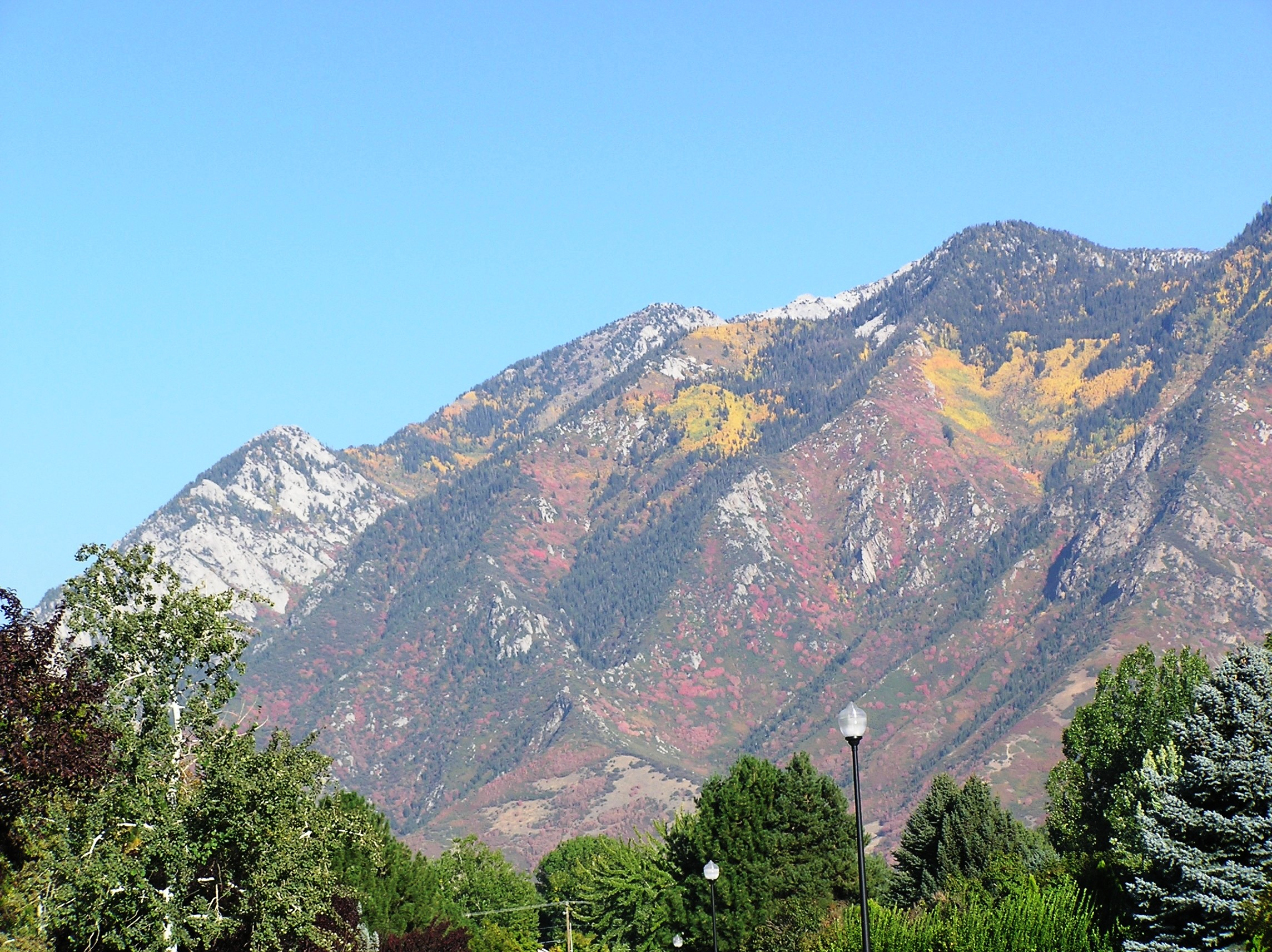
The Wasatch Mountains in the fall, September 2003

The range's highest point — 11,928 feet (3,636 m) — is Mount Nebo, a triple peak rising above Nephi, at the southern end of the range. In some places the mountains rise steeply from the valley's base elevation of 4,330 feet (1,320 m) to over 11,000 feet (3,400 m). Other notable peaks include Mount Timpanogos, a massive peak that looms over northern Utah County and is especially prominent from Pleasant Grove and Orem; Lone Peak, the Twin Peaks, and Mount Olympus, which overlooks the Salt Lake Valley; Francis Peak overlooking both Morgan and Davis counties; and Ben Lomond and Mount Ogden, both towering over Ogden.

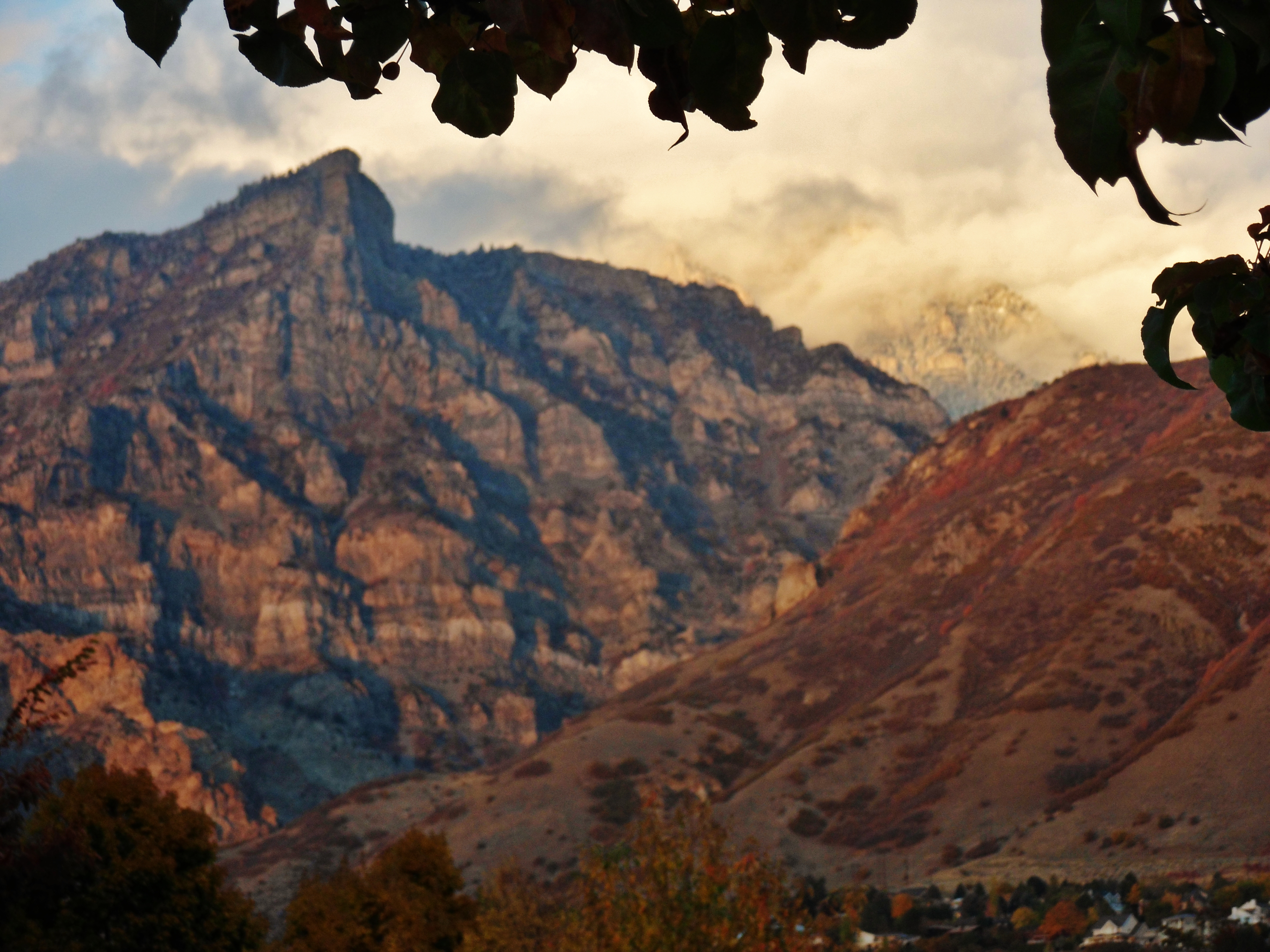
Kyhv Peak over Rock Canyon at sunset as seen from the campus of Brigham Young University in Provo, August 2012

Topping out below 12,000 feet (3,700 m), Wasatch peaks are not especially high compared to the Rocky Mountains of Colorado or even the Uinta Mountains (the other main portion of the Rocky Mountains in Utah). However, they are sculpted by glaciers, yielding notably rugged, sweeping upland scenery. They also receive heavy snowfall: more than 500 inches (1,300 cm) per year in some places. This great snowfall, with its runoff, made possible a prosperous urban strip of some 25 cities along nearly 100 miles (160 km) of mountain frontage. The Wasatch Range is home to a high concentration of ski areas, with 11 stretching from Sundance in northeastern Utah County to Powder Mountain and Nordic Valley Ski Area northeast of Ogden. There are also two ski resorts in the Bear River Mountains (Beaver Mountain and Cherry Peak Resort). Park City alone is bordered by two ski resorts. Due to the low relative humidity in wintertime, along with the added lake-effect from the Great Salt Lake, the snow has a dry, powdery texture which most of the local ski resorts market as "the Greatest Snow on Earth". The snow and nearby ski resorts helped Salt Lake City gain the right to host the 2002 Winter Olympics.

Several of the canyons in the Lone Peak area, most notably Little Cottonwood Canyon, have several high-quality granite outcroppings, and make up a popular climbing area such as the Pfeifferhorn. Farther north, Big Cottonwood Canyon features tricky climbing on quartzite.

The densely vegetated narrow canyons of the Wasatch Range, such as Big Cottonwood Canyon and Little Cottonwood Canyon, are heavily visited; on 25 September 2005, 1,200 automobiles entered Little Cottonwood in an hour. The canyons sit within 24 miles (39 km) of downtown Salt Lake City and the year-round paved roadways can reach 5,000 feet (1,500 m) higher in elevation above the city within a short distance. Dirt roads readily drivable in passenger cars with moderate clearance stretch up from Park City, Heber, and Big Cottonwood Canyon. These reach about 10,000 feet (3,000 m) above sea level and provide long-range high country views.

== Geography and geology ==
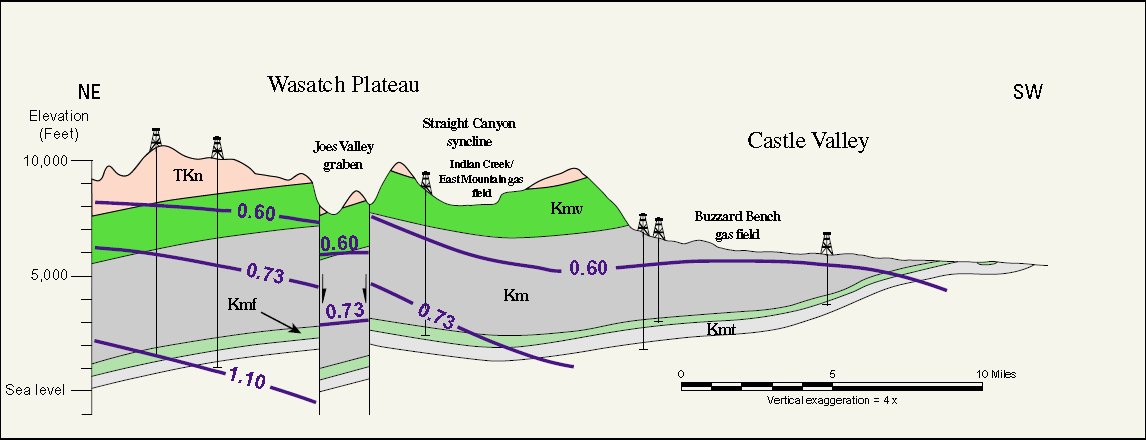
Wasatch Plateau geologic cross-section, where Kmt and Kmf are the Tununk and Ferron Sandstone members of the Mancos Shale, Km. Kmv is the Mesaverde Group, and Tkn is the North Horn Formation.

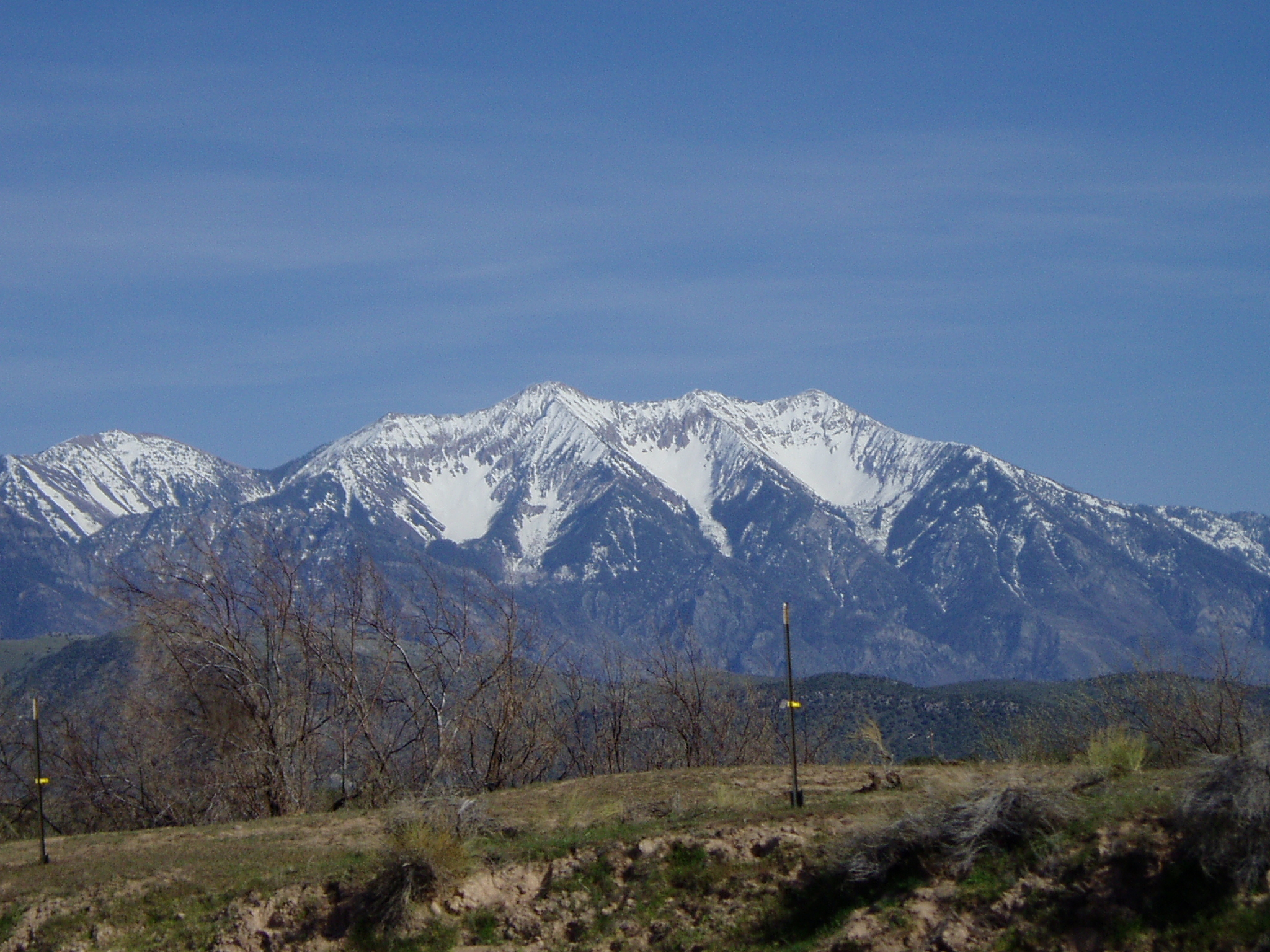
West side of Mount Nebo, the highest peak in the Wasatch Range, unknown date

The Wasatch Range's origins are rooted in the Sevier Orogeny. As the Farallon plate subducted under the North American plate between the Jurassic and Paleogene, the regional stress regime became a maximum striking east to west. This horizontal compression caused thin skinned imbricated thrust faults resulting in as much as 50% crustal shortening of the western North American Plate. The Wasatch anticlinorium represented the furthest eastern margins of these Sevier origin imbricated thrusts. Once the Farallon plate had largely subducted, the NW moving Pacific plate latched onto the North American Plate, causing a change in regional stress. Sevier thrust ramps were reactivated into normal faults, causing crustal extension as the Pacific plate drags the western margins of the North American plate to the NW. The current Wasatch range continues to grow via normal faults as the valley drops in periodic motion. Mount Nebo, the highest peak of the Wasatch, is at the southern edge of the range. The Colorado Plateau comes to its northwest corner as it meets the southern end of the Rocky Mountains. Immediately west of these two, the Great Basin, which is the northern region of the Basin and Range Province, begins and stretches westward across western Utah and Nevada until it reaches the Sierra Nevada near the Nevada/California border. Geologic faults punctuate the range, chief among them the Wasatch Fault. These faults also formed the Timpanogos Cave.

A series of mountain valleys punctuate the northern Wasatch Range. While the western side of the range drops sharply to the floors of the Wasatch Front valleys, the eastern side of the range is gentler, allowing for the construction of several ski resorts. The Cottonwoods, a particularly rugged and dense area just east of the Salt Lake Valley, shelters small mountain coves that harbor four world-famous ski resorts (Alta, Brighton, Solitude, and Snowbird). The eastern slopes of the Cottonwoods drop to the Snyderville Basin, which contains Park City and its two ski resorts (Park City Mountain Resort and Deer Valley). Much of the eastern side of the range, from north of Salt Lake City to the Bear River Mountains, is especially gentle compared to the rest of the range. The range widens east of Ogden, sheltering a high mountain valley known as the Ogden Valley. Three more ski resorts lie here, as well as several small towns (such as Huntsville, Liberty, and Eden).

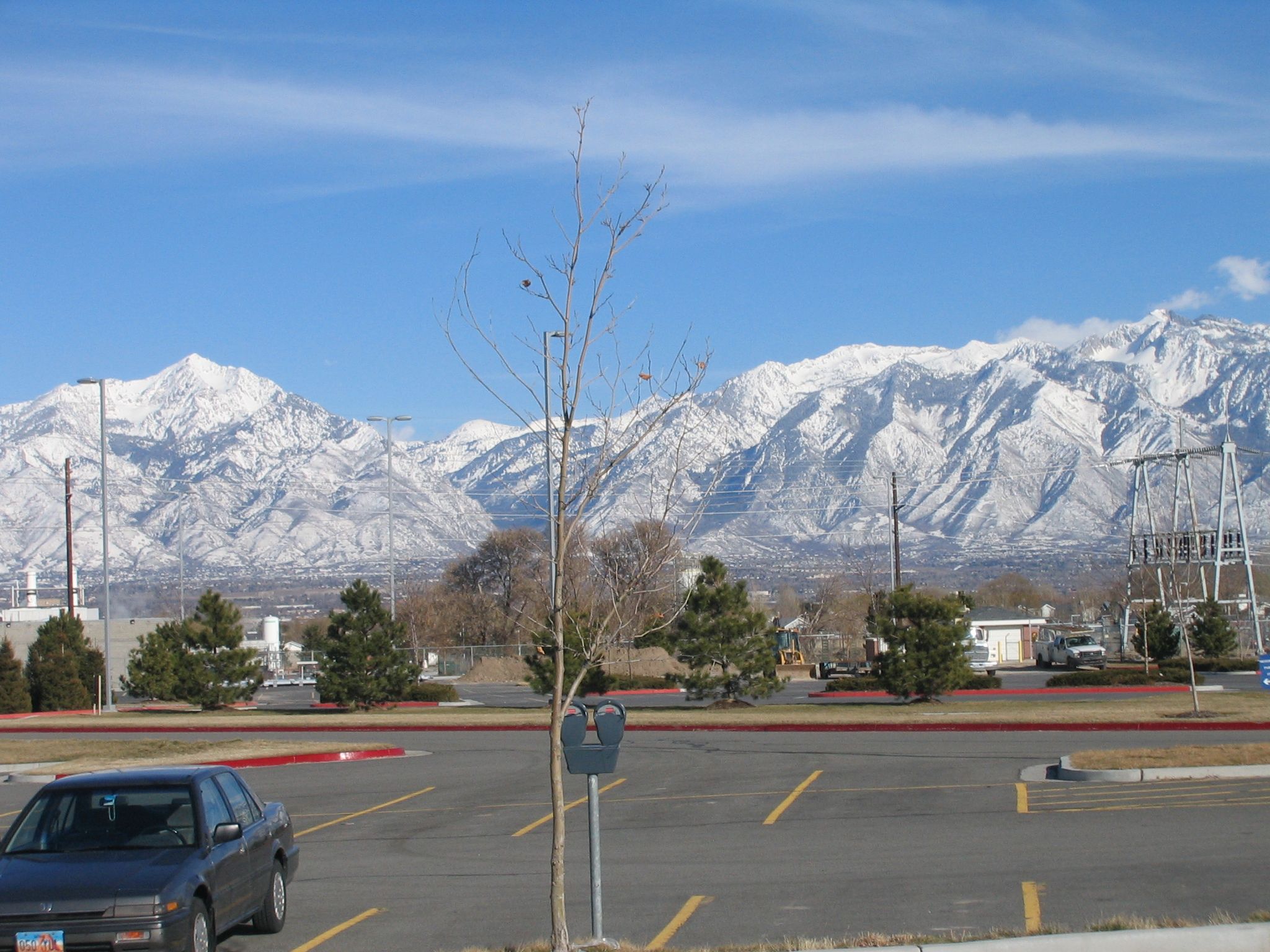
The Wasatch Range viewed from Jordan Campus of Salt Lake Community College, March 2006

North of this, the Wellsville Mountains branch off from the northwest of the range, continuing a line of mountains paralleling the I-15 corridor. This range is exceptionally thin and steep. However, US-89/US-91 is maintained as a four-lane highway through the range at Wellsville Canyon east of Brigham City. Cache Valley, created by the Bear River, is flanked on the west by the Wellsville Mountains and on the east by the much denser and higher Bear River Mountains. The northwestern border of Cache Valley is flanked by the Bannock Range in Idaho. The two highest peaks in this area are Mount Naomi and Mount Logan, each just under 10,000 feet (3,000 m).

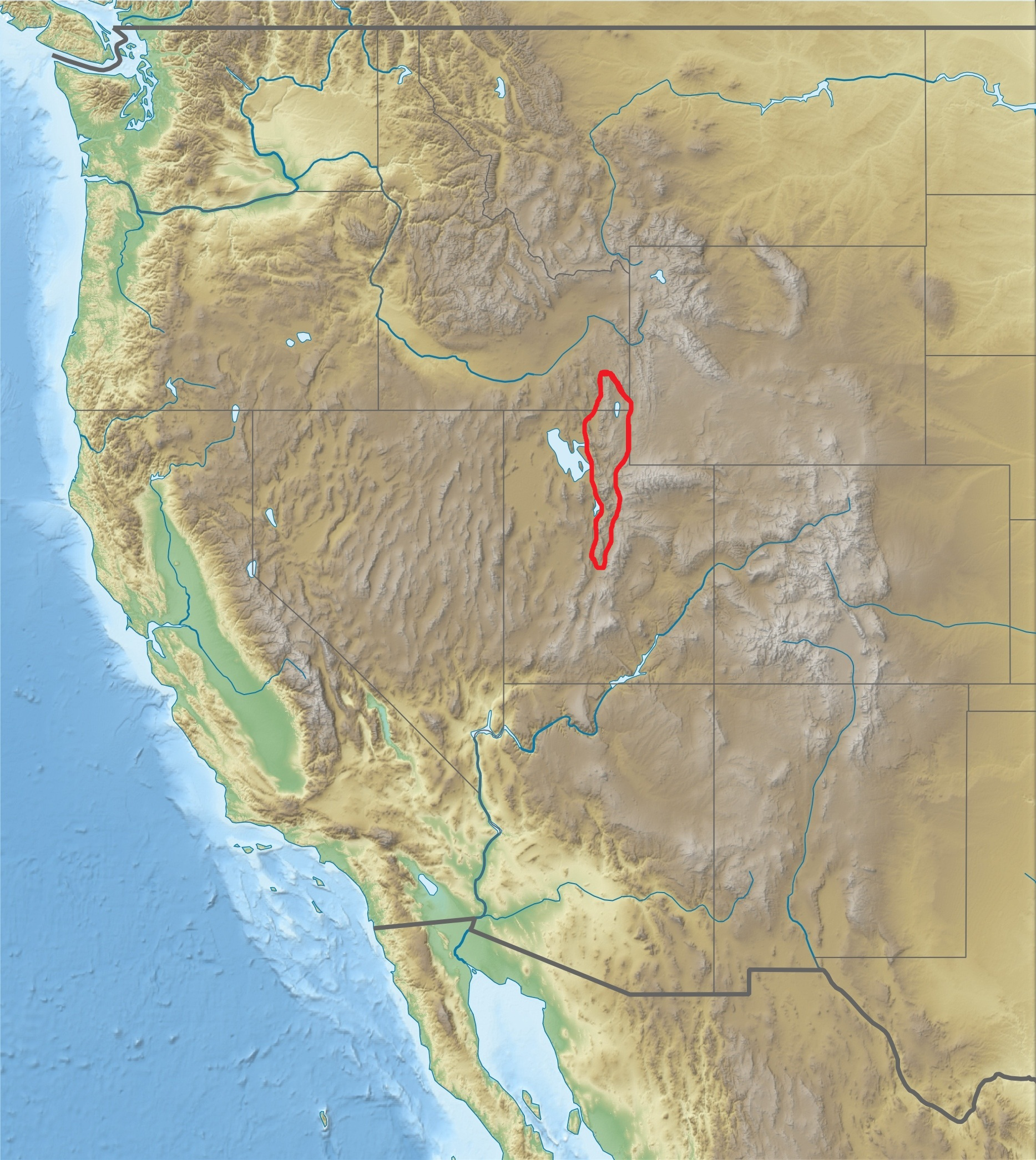
The western United States with the Wasatch Range outlined in red

The southeastern portion of the range across Wasatch County transforms into the relatively flat, windswept Wasatch Plateau at an elevation of about 8,500 feet (2,600 m) to 9,500 feet (2,900 m). At its southeastern edge, just north of Helper, it runs into the Book Cliffs. Further north, the Heber Valley and Weber River Valley separate the Wasatch Range from the Uinta Mountains, while the Bear River Valley and Bear Lake Valley separate it from lower mountain ranges that mark the western edge of the Green River Basin.

The Wasatch Range is traversed by just seven highways, along with several rugged mountain roads and unpaved trails. The most prominent are I-80 through Parley's Canyon east of Salt Lake City and I-84 through Weber Canyon southeast of Ogden. They meet near the ghost town of Echo on the eastern slopes of the range and continue northeast as I‑80. Other highways through the range include US-6/US-89 through Spanish Fork Canyon, US-189 through Provo Canyon, Utah State Route 39 extending east from Huntsville (a route which is closed in winter), US‑89/US-91 through Logan Canyon, and along Idaho State Highway 36 near the northern end of the range.

The Denver and Rio Grande Western Railroad had a line through the Wasatch Range via Soldier Summit Pass and Spanish Fork Canyon. Now operated by the Union Pacific Railroad, the line is used by freight trains and Amtrak's California Zephyr.

== Ecology ==
The Wasatch Range is part of the Wasatch and Uinta Mountains Level 3 Ecoregion, a temperate coniferous forest. Common trees include Douglas fir (Pseudotsuga menziesii), subalpine fir (Abies bifolia), Engelmann spruce (Picea engelmannii), Colorado blue spruce (Picea pungens), and quaking aspen (Populus tremuloides). Gambel oak (Quercus gambelii) is common on the foothills of the range from just south of Brigham City in the north, to the southern extension of the Wasatch Range. It is not found in the northern portion of the Range. Ponderosa pine (Pinus ponderosa), while abundant elsewhere in Utah is not common in this mountain range, except in plantations in Big Cottonwood Canyon southeast of Salt Lake City and in Logan Canyon, east of Logan. Some individual trees have been found in remote areas of the Wasatch Range that appear to be relic individuals from past populations.

Subspecies of big sagebrush (Artemisia tridentata) dominate drier portions of the landscapes. Most of the sagebrush that occurs in the Wasatch Range is mountain big sagebrush (Artemisia tridentata ssp. vaseyana). Many of the valley bottoms at one time were occupied by basin big sagebrush (Artemisia tridentata ssp. tridentata). Most of this subspecies has been removed, however, because it occurred on what constitutes prime agricultural lands. In upper elevations, and on slightly more mesic sites than that of mountain big sagebrush, one can find subalpine big sagebrush (Artemisia tridenta ssp. spiciformis). This subspecies occupies productive sites and often has a lush understory of wildflowers and grasses. Wyoming big sagebrush (Artemisia tridentata ssp. wyomingensis) occurs at the lowest and driest elevations, although much of the Wasatch Range is above the elevation where this subspecies occurs. All sagebrush species, combined, provide critical habitat to greater sage grouse, a species under consideration for listing by the United States Fish and Wildlife Service.

The Wasatch Range is home to several plants that occur nowhere other than in this area. Several of these are rare and restricted to narrow geological formations, while others are more widely distributed throughout the area. Some of the less rare endemics include five-petal cliffbush (Jamesia americana var. macrocalyx), Sierra fumewort (Corydalis caseana ssp. brachycarpa), and Utah angelica (Angelica wheeleri).

== Recreation ==
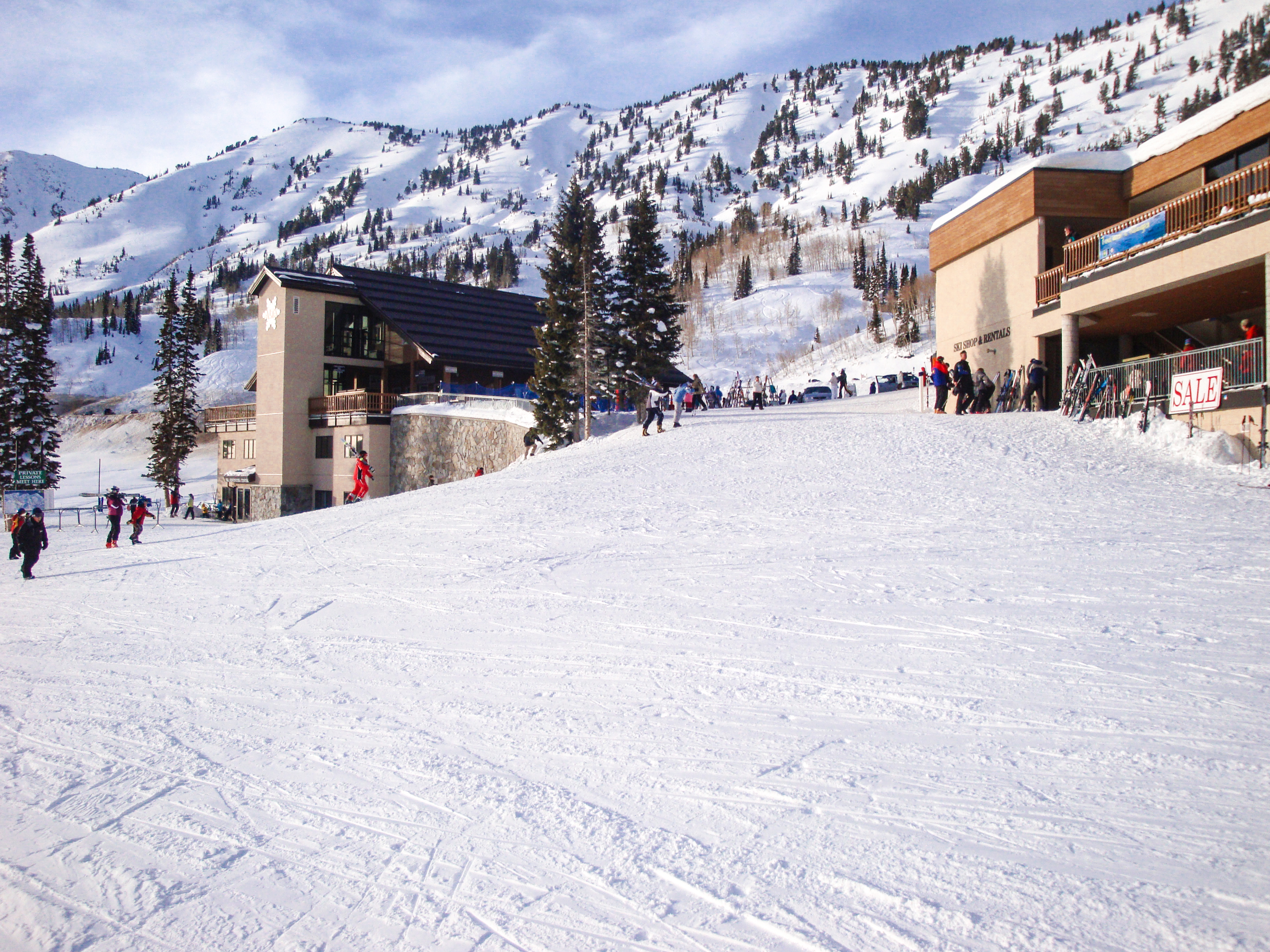
Alta ski resort in Little Cottonwood Canyon, February 2009

In addition to ski resorts, there are hundreds of miles of mountain biking and hiking trails winding through the canyons and alpine valleys of the Wasatch Range. These offer backcountry access close to a large metropolitan area. There is rock climbing and mountaineering on the towering limestone, granite, and quartzite peaks and in many of the surrounding canyons.

Winter recreation includes ski touring, ski mountaineering, and snowshoeing.

Alpine lakes and streams offer somewhat overworked fishing opportunities. The Wasatch Mountain Club has regular activities. The Utah Native Plant Society conducts regular walks from spring until fall along the foothills of the central Wasatch Front and in adjoining canyons as the season progresses. Many wildflowers bloom in the late summer in Albion Basin at the top of Little Cottonwood Canyon.

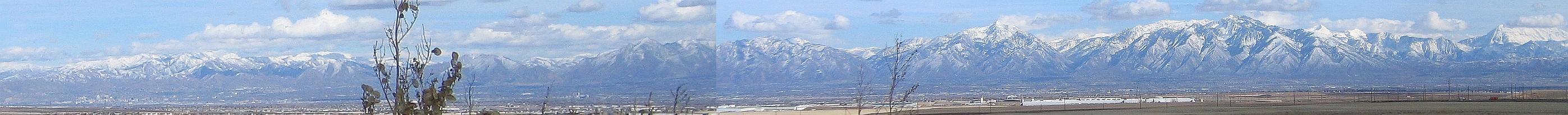
The Salt Lake Valley urban area, a major portion of the Wasatch Front. The Wasatch Mountains extend both north and south of the valley.

== See also ==
- List of mountain ranges of Utah
- List of mountain ranges of Idaho
