= Little Cottonwood Canyon =

Canyon in Northern Utah

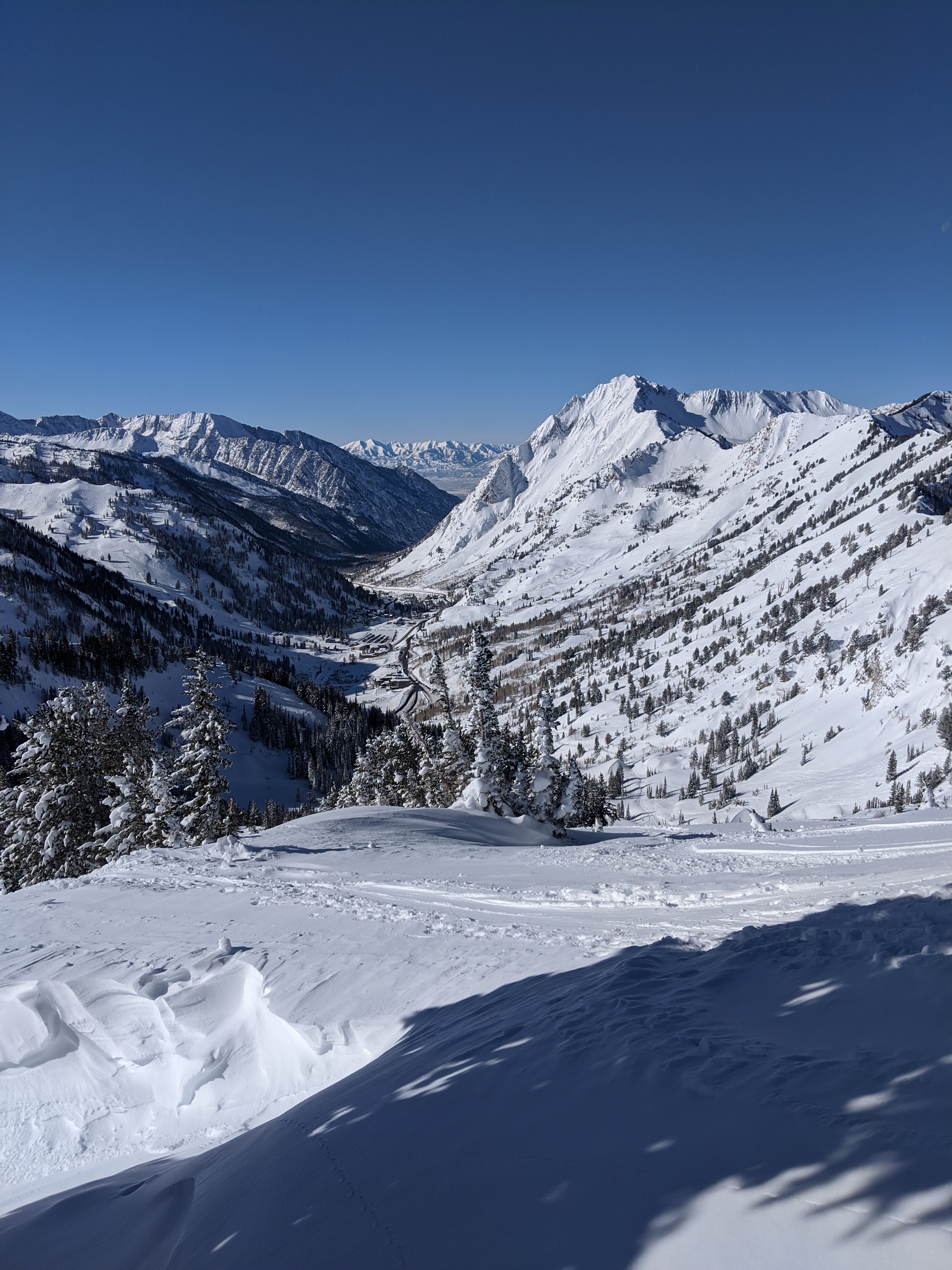
- Near the top of Little Cottonwood Canyon looking west toward the Salt Lake Valley.

- Location within Utah Location within the United States
- Elevation: 5,400 ft (1,600 m)

Location
- Location: Salt Lake County, Utah
- Range: Wasatch Mountain Range
- Coordinates: 40°34′24″N 111°46′35″W

Little Cottonwood Canyon lies within the Wasatch-Cache National Forest along the eastern side of the Salt Lake Valley, roughly 15 miles (24 km) from Salt Lake City, Utah. The canyon is part of Granite, a CDP and "Community Council" designated by Salt Lake County. The canyon is a glacial trough (U-shaped canyon), carved by an alpine glacier during the last ice age, 15,000 to 25,000 years ago. A number of rare and endemic plant species are found in the canyon's Albion Basin. Introduced Mountain goats inhabit the surrounding mountains.

The Salt Lake Temple of the Church of Jesus Christ of Latter-day Saints was built of blocks of quartz monzonite, granite, and granodiorite which Latter Day Saint pioneers quarried from the Little Cottonwood Stock near the mouth of the canyon.

State Route 210 is the primary access road to the canyon, running from the canyon mouth up to Alta. Little Cottonwood Creek runs down the length of the canyon, beginning at Cecret Lake at Alta and flowing westward.

== Geology ==
The Little Cottonwood stock is a granitic intrusion that extends from the mouth of the canyon almost to Snowbird ski resort. It is Oligocene in age, roughly 30.5 to 29 million years old, composed primarily of granodiorite, quartz monzonite, and granite, with some mafic enclaves. The Little Cottonwood stock is intruded in its northeast corner by another unit called the White Pine intrusion, and other smaller igneous units, collectively about 27–26 million years old, which are the source of the inactive White Pine molybdenum ore deposit in White Pine fork.

The intrusion and its associated ore deposit have several interesting features, including quartz-bearing porphyry, pebble dikes, and other features related to hydrothermal ore deposit processes, and possibly volcanism, that occurred during intrusion.

The intrusion is also the footwall of the East Traverse Mountain Mega-Landslide, and its presence is probably a second-order control on the cause of the landslide, in addition to the elevation gradient caused by the nearby Wasatch Fault.

== Hydrology ==
The Little Cottonwood Canyon watershed provides drinking water to much of Salt Lake County. The National Forest Service considers Little Cottonwood Canyon a protected watershed area. In order to prevent contamination of the watershed by fecal runoff, no dogs (except service animals and avalanche search dogs) are permitted in the canyon.

== Alta (Town) ==
The town of Alta serves as the only permanent center of population within Little Cottonwood Canyon, and sits at an elevation ranging from 7,500 to 9,500 feet. According to the 2010 census, the town's population was 383 people, and was officially incorporated in 1970. Following the discovery of silver in the canyon in 1865, the canyon experienced its first significant influx of settlers to the area. In 1937, the town's unofficial mayor, George Watson, gained the rights to 1800 acres worth of surface land within the canyon to begin a ski resort. In 1938, America's second chairlift was constructed, which later became the Alta Ski Resort, and still runs today and is heavily intertwined with the operations of the town. While the town of Alta is the only permanent population in the canyon, there are many vacation homes, apartments, and condos that serve travelers, contributing to population fluctuation within the canyon throughout the year.

== Recreational activities ==
Recreational activities in Little Cottonwood Canyon include hiking, camping, fishing, mountain biking, rock climbing, Bouldering, skiing, snowboarding, and backcountry use. There are two resorts in the canyon, Alta and Snowbird, providing both summer and winter recreational opportunities. The Utah Native Plant Society often conducts wildflower walks at Albion Basin and in other locations in the canyon. The road is approximately 8.3 miles from the base of the canyon to the top with an average grade of 9.2%, making it a popular road cycling challenge.

=== Skiing and snowboarding ===
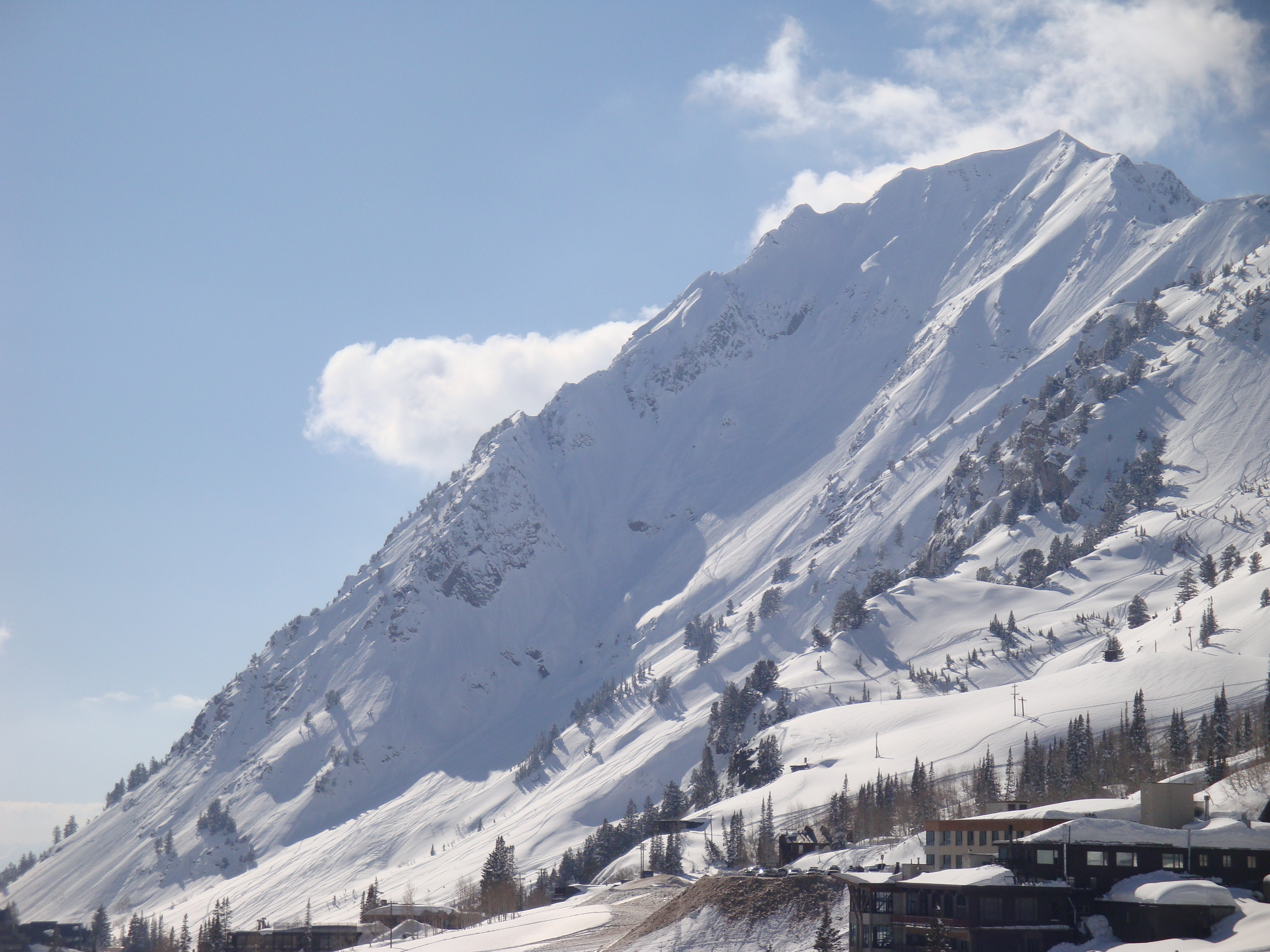
Mt. Superior

Little Cottonwood Canyon is home to two ski areas, Snowbird and Alta. The Alta lodge opened in 1941; however the resort itself opened in January of 1939, and the Snowbird resort opened in 1971. Both areas are well known for the amount of snow they receive each year with Alta averaging approximately 543 inches per year and Snowbird averaging about 500. Alta sits at a slightly higher average elevation than Snowbird, being further up the canyon which explains the slight difference in Snowfall. Alta offers 2614 skiable acres and Snowbird offers about 2500 skiable acres. Both resorts are often regarded as some of America's hardest with majority expert terrain due to the abundance of steep chutes and glades within resort boundaries. The canyon is also well known for its backcountry skiing access, with over 300 named backcountry runs including one of the most prominent peaks in the canyon, Mount Superior. Notably, Alta has a no snowboarding policy.

=== Rock climbing ===
The lower third of the canyon is strewn with quartz monzonite, granite, and granodiorite outcroppings, mostly consisting of smooth steep faces, some up to several hundred feet high. Local climbers informally refer to the rock as granite, which is a close relative to quartz monzonite.

The earliest recorded climbing activity dates from the 1930s, when Harold Goodro put up some routes before shifting to predominantly climbing on the quartzite of Big Cottonwood Canyon and elsewhere. Many of the major routes in Little Cottonwood were established in the early 1960s by the Alpenbock Club, some in conjunction with well-known visitors including Fred Beckey, Layton Kor, and Royal Robbins. The Lowes – George Lowe, Greg Lowe, and Jeff Lowe – came to prominence through the rest of the 1960s and early 1970s. More recent climbers have pushed the standards to the highest levels, establishing several 5.13 routes.

Access can be a problem. On the north side, the "Church Buttress" above the Granite Mountain Records Vault, and the Black Peeler Buttress, are on private land and not legally accessible, as are parts of the south side. This still leaves some 20-odd named buttresses and gullies available for climbing, mostly on the north side. Approaches involve parking alongside the road and hiking a short distance up through scrub oak, sometimes scrambling through fields of enormous boulders.

Face climbing is the predominant technique, typically using bolts and cracks for protection, but there are many notable crack climbs as well. Most routes are 2-4 pitches in length, with walkoffs involving still more scrub oak.

The highest-quality face routes are to be found on The Fin, an almost-featureless expanse high above the canyon. Its route The Dorsal Fin (5.10d) is a classic of the Wasatch; first ascended by George Lowe and Mark McQuarrie in 1965, the bolts of this four-pitch were all drilled on the lead.

The canyon also includes Gate Buttress, whose 80+ routes include the aptly named Schoolroom (5.6), a five-pitch route requiring a wide variety of techniques, along with routes ranging up to 5.12a in difficulty. Below the buttress and near the road is the Gate Boulder, a popular gathering spot shaded by large trees.

The Pfeifferhorn is one of the highest peaks to climb in the Wasatch. The peak is usually climbed from the Red Pine Lake area, a ten-mile roundtrip climb that gains 3,700 feet. The peak was named after Chuck Pfeiffer, a Wasatch Club leader from long ago.

With 529 climbs currently established, Little Cottonwood Canyon has the second most bouldering routes in Utah. These routes vary in difficulty, from V0 to V16. Some of the most commonly climbed areas throughout the canyon include Secret Garden, 5 Mile, and White Pine.

== Gondola controversy ==
On August 31, 2022, the Utah Department of Transportation (UDOT) announced "Gondola Alternative B", a plan to build a Gondola transit system connecting the base of Little Cottonwood Canyon with Alta and Snowbird ski areas. A coalition of environmental groups opposed to the gondola have filed lawsuits against UDOT to block the gondola, claiming UDOT exceeded its authority and violated the National Environmental Policy Act .

== Gallery ==
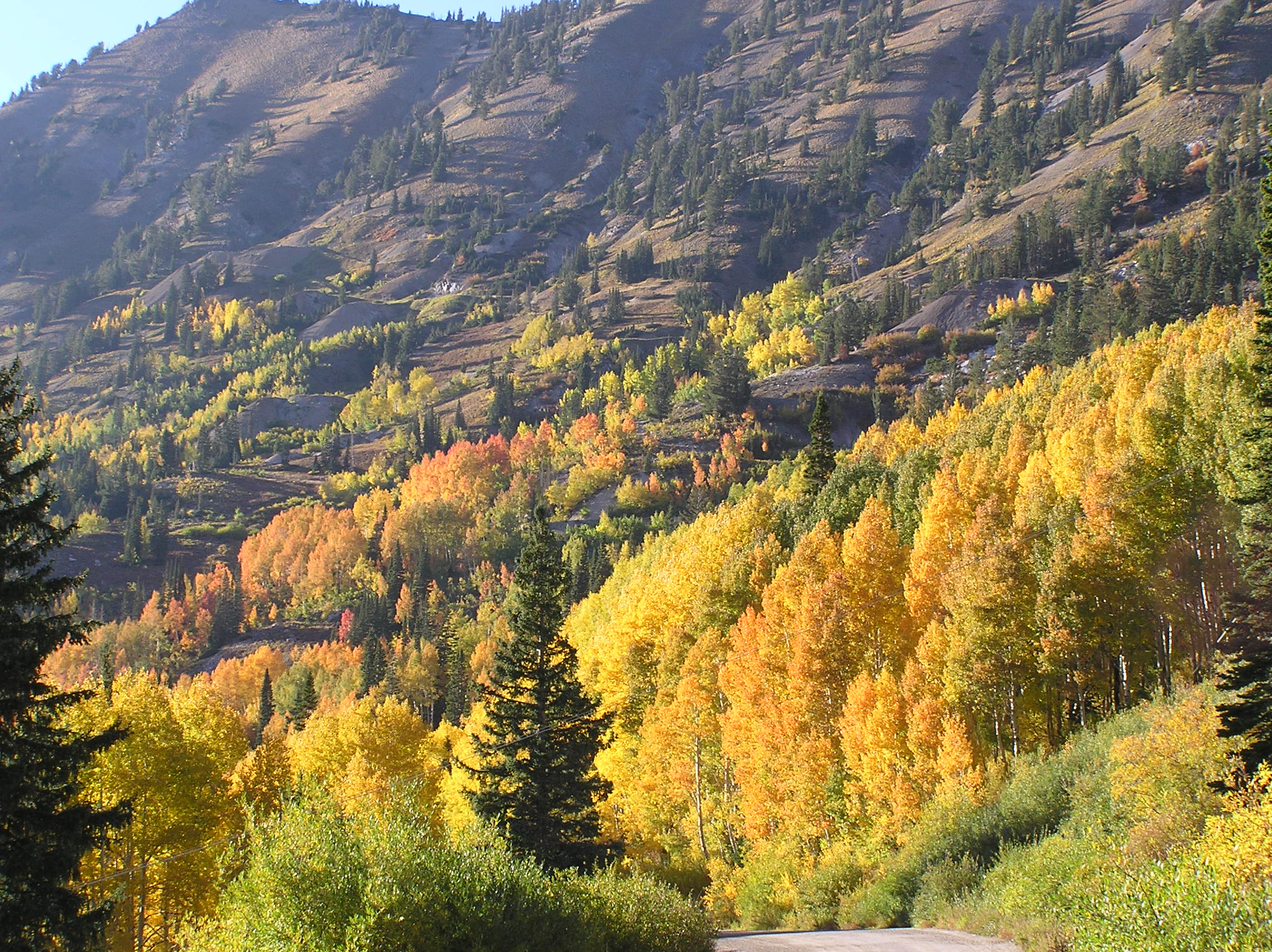
Fall Foliage in the canyon (September 2005)

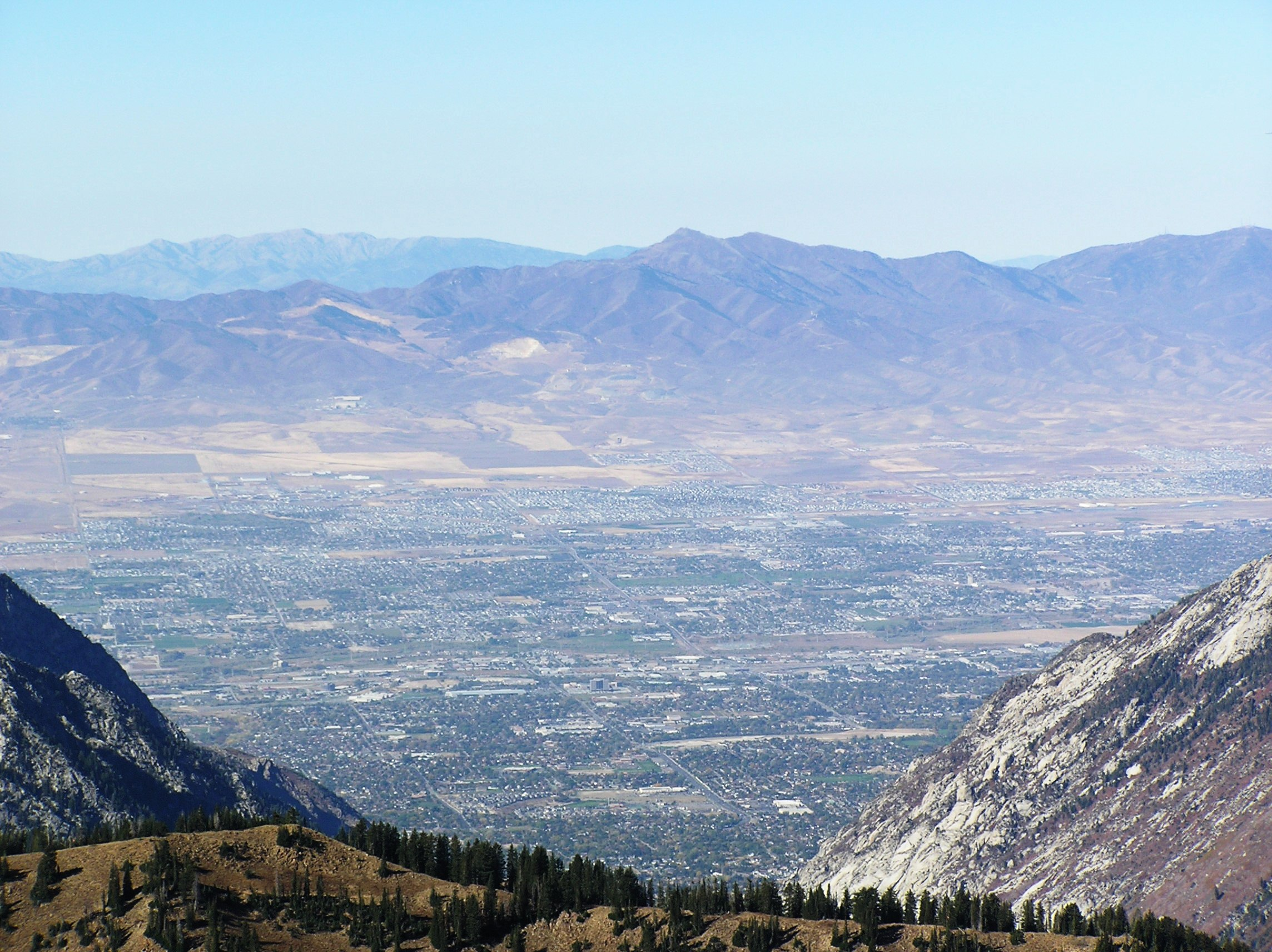
View of Salt Lake Valley from Hidden Peak summit (2004)

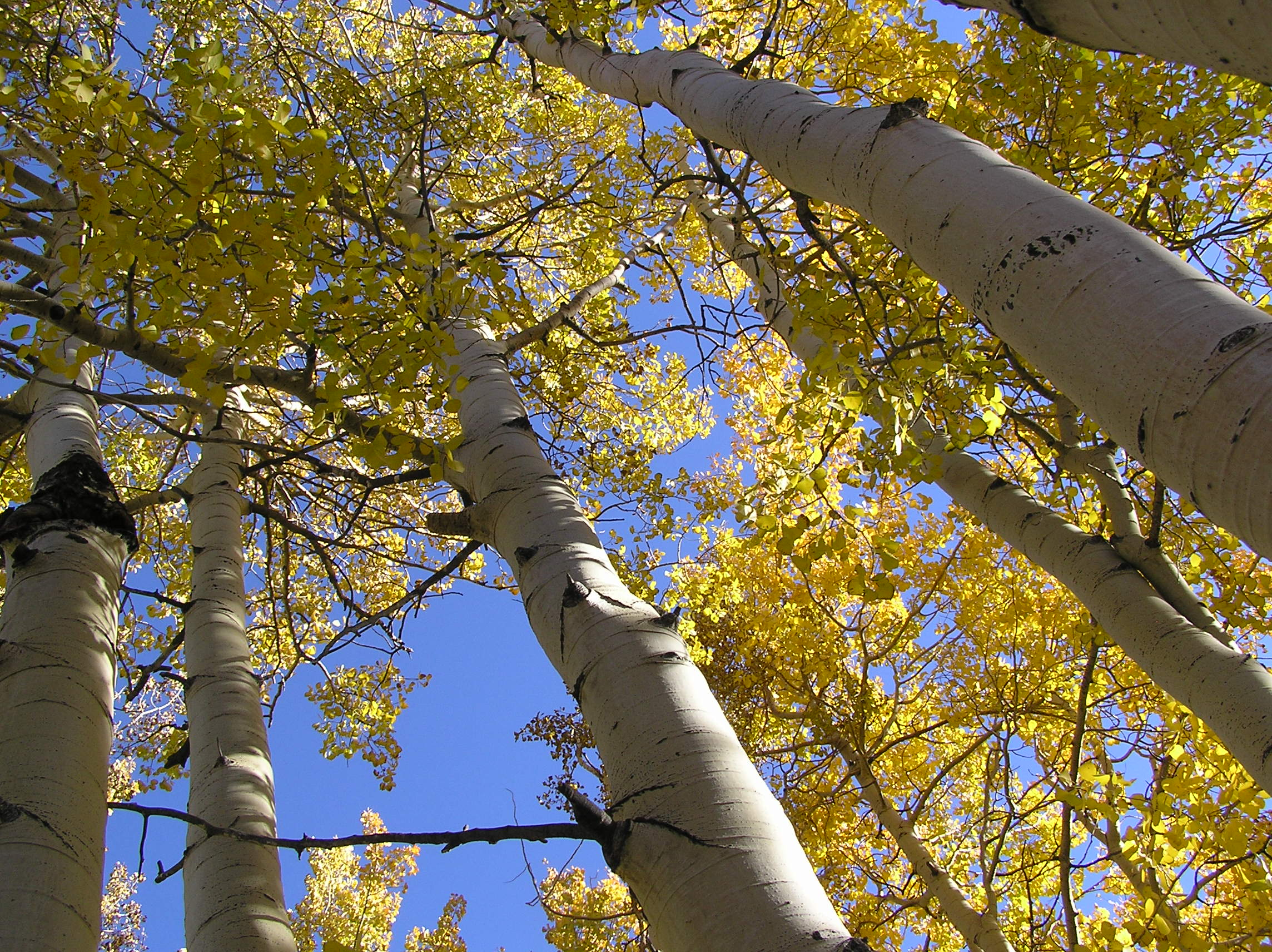
Quaking Aspens (September 2005)

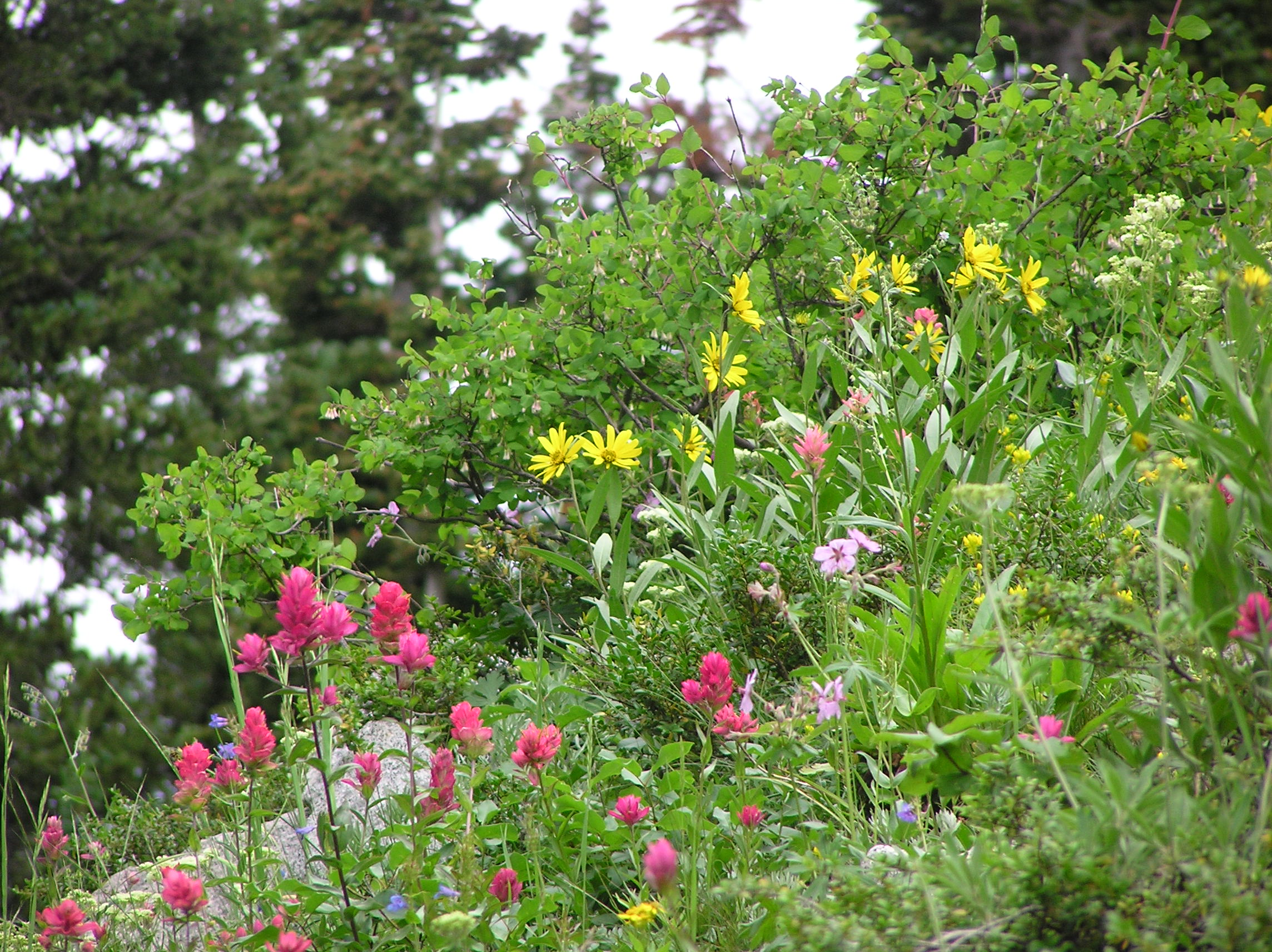
Albion Basin Wildflowers (July 2004)

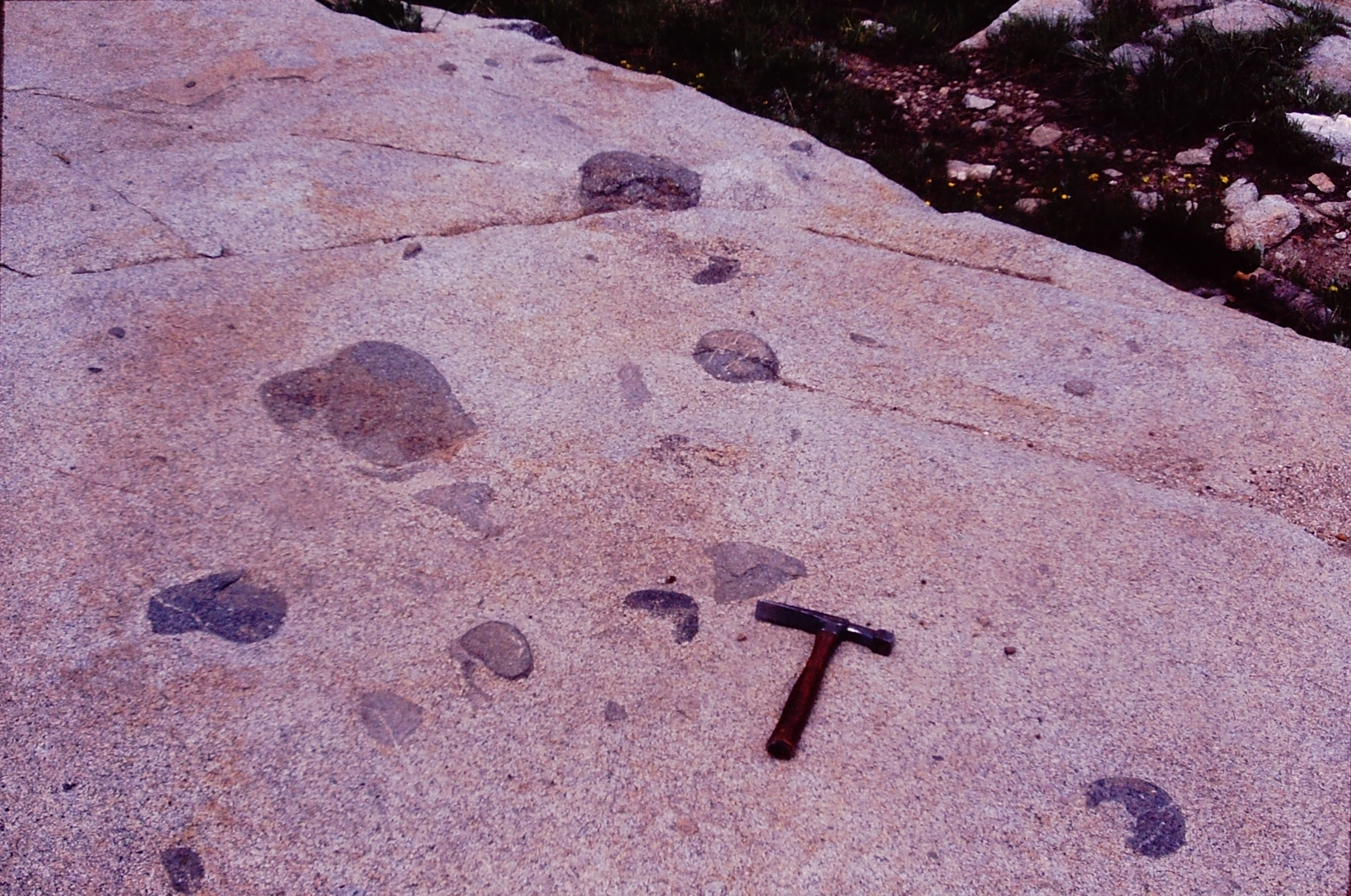
Xenoliths in granodiorite of the Alta Stock at the east end of the canyon (1997)

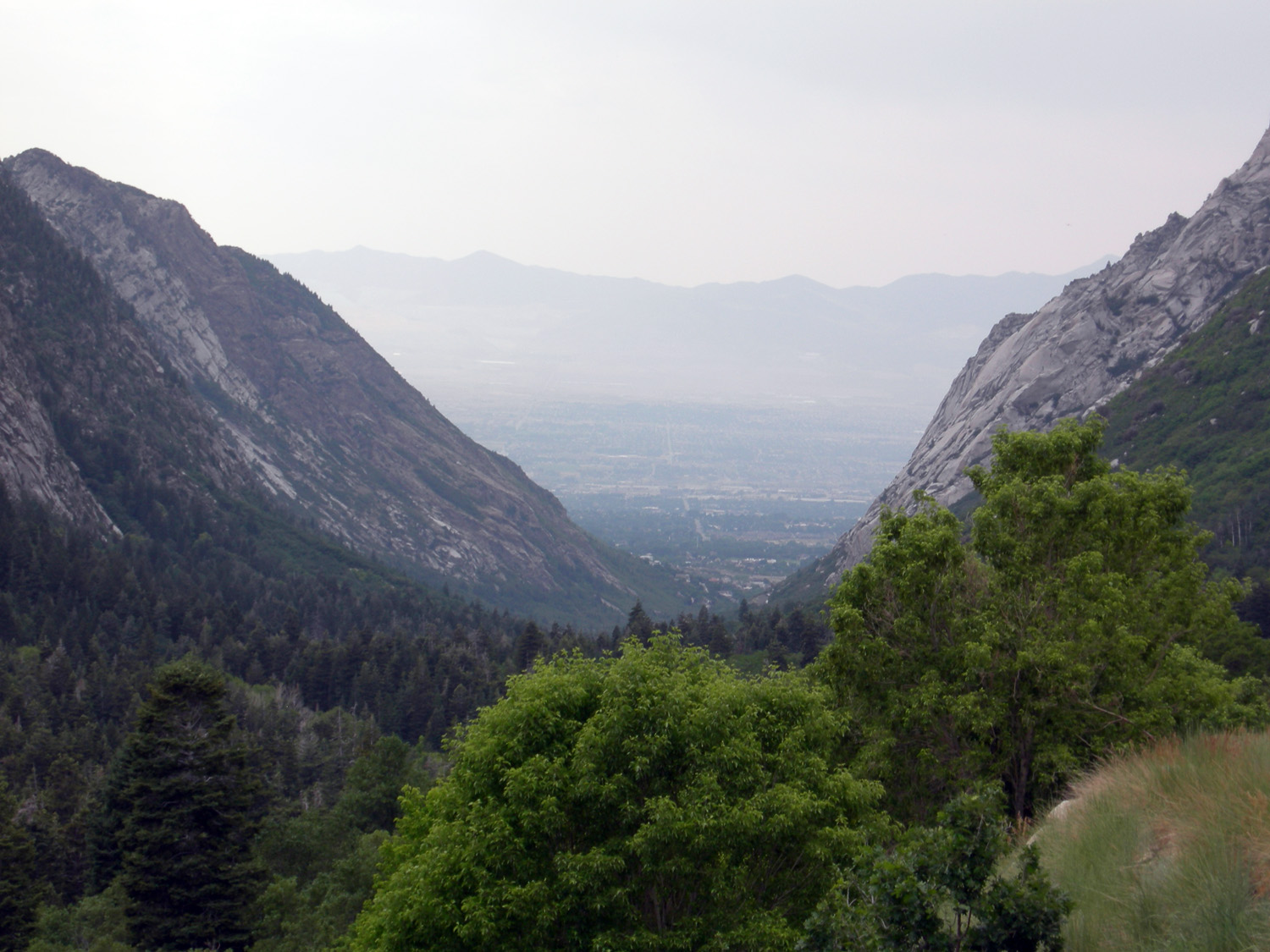
U-shaped valley carved by a glacier in Little Cottonwood Canyon (July 2008)

== See also ==
- List of canyons and gorges in Utah
- Little Cottonwood Creek (Salt Lake County, Utah)
