= Red Pine Lake =

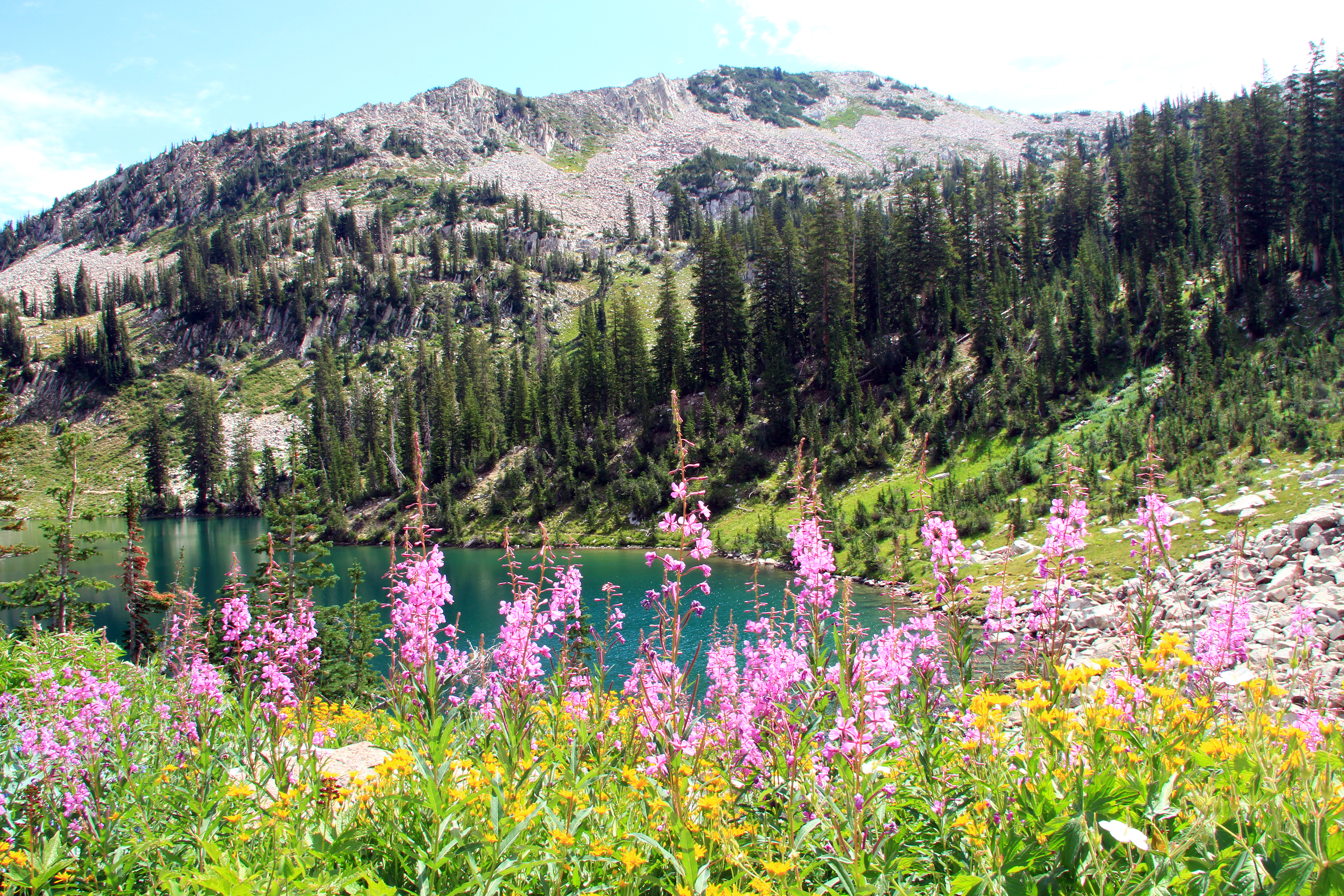
- Red Pine Lake in 2012
- Interactive map of Red Pine Lake
- Coordinates: 40.543°N 111.693°W
- Type: Reservoir
- Basin countries: United States
- Built: 1920
- Surface elevation: 9,600 feet (2,900 m)
- Islands: None

Red Pine Lake is a small alpine reservoir in Little Cottonwood Canyon, in the U.S. state of Utah. This area is also part of the Wasatch National Forest. Red Pine Dam, which holds the lake, was constructed in 1920.

The lake can be accessed through a dirt trail from a parking lot off the main road. The most common route is around 7 miles round trip. The lake has a capacity of 100 acre-feet, with the surface area fluctuating frequently through seasons. Recreation around the lake includes fishing, hiking, climbing, and camping, although swimming and wading are prohibited due to it being a protected watershed.

Red Pine is considered a watershed area which supplies drinking water for Salt Lake City metropolitan area. This drinking water comes from several hundred inches of snow each year that lasts into July.

== Dam ==
Red Pine Dam
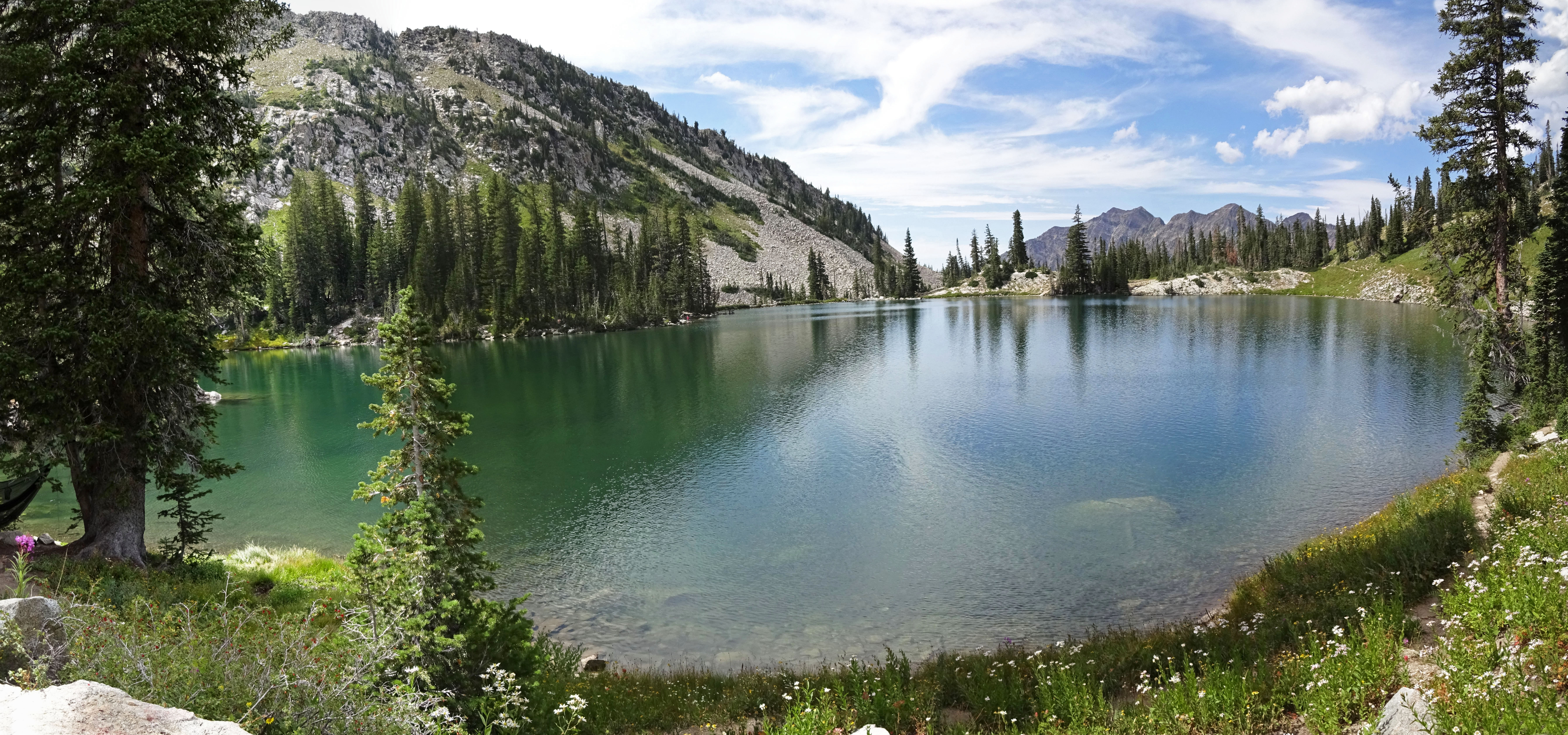
- Interactive map of Red Pine Dam
- Country: United States
- Location: Little Cottonwood Canyon
- Coordinates: 40.5437°N 111.6945°W
- Purpose: Irrigation
- Status: Operational
- Construction began: 1920
- Opening date: 1929
- Owner: Utah Division of Water Rights

Dam and spillways
- Type of dam: Earth-fill dam
- Elevation at crest: 20 feet
- Width (crest): 242 feet

Reservoir
- Creates: Red Pine Lake
- Total capacity: 100 acre-feet

Red Pine Dam (National ID # UT00256) is an earthen dam completed in 1929 with a height of 20 feet tall and 242 feet wide. The dam impounds water from Red Pine Fork mainly for irrigation. It is owned and regulated by the Utah Division of Water Rights, although it sits inside of the Wasatch–Cache National Forest. In the latest inspection, the dams condition was assessed as poor with a high hazard potential.
