= 9th Wisconsin Infantry Regiment =

Union Army infantry regiment

- Flag of Wisconsin
- Active: October 26, 1861 – January 30, 1866
- Country: United States
- Allegiance: Union
- Branch: Infantry
- Size: Regiment
- Nickname: German Regiment
- Engagements: First Battle of Newtonia; Battle of Prairie Grove; Van Buren raid; Camden Expedition; Skirmish at Terre Noire Creek; Battle of Elkin's Ferry; Battle of Prairie D'Ane; Battle of Jenkins' Ferry

Commanders
- Colonel: Frederick Salomon
- Colonel: Charles Eberhard Salomon
- Lt. Colonel: Arthur Jacobi
- Cpt.: George Eckhart

The 9th Wisconsin Infantry Regiment was a volunteer infantry regiment that served in the Union Army during the American Civil War. The regiment was informally known as the "German Regiment" on account of its high enlistment of German recruits, primarily from Milwaukee. They spent nearly the entire war on guard and anti-guerilla duty in Kansas, Missouri, and Arkansas, in the western theater of the war.

== Service ==
The 9th Wisconsin Infantry Regiment was raised at Milwaukee, Wisconsin, and mustered into Federal service October 26, 1861. It consisted predominantly of recent immigrants from German-speaking countries. The bulk of the regiment mustered out at the expiration of their three-year enlistments ion November 17, 1864. The veterans who chose to re-enlist, along with recruits who had arrived after the initial enlistment, were reorganized as a battalion of four companies which continued in service until January 1866.

== Detailed service record ==
Organized at Camp Sigel, Milwaukee; mustered into federal service October 26, 1861, under Colonel Frederick Salomon; departed from Milwaukee on January 22, 1862.

Ordered to proceeded to Fort Scott, Kansas, they went by way of Chicago, Quincy, Illinois, and the Hannibal and St. Joseph Railroad. Arrived at Weston, Missouri, on January 26, 1862, remained two days there before marching to Leavenworth, Kansas. They remained at Leavenworth until March 1, when they continued south, marching 160 miles to Fort Scott, and arriving on March 7, 1862.

The 9th Wisconsin was initially ordered to Fort Scott to join the "Southwestern Expedition" of General Jim Lane, but that mission was abandoned. They remained at Fort Scott until May 27, with the exception of companies A, C, F, and K, which were stationed at Carthage, Missouri, from May 1 to May 17.

On May 27, they were ordered to proceed to Spring River, arriving June 6, and then to Baxter Springs, Kansas, on June 13. They remained here until June 28, and engaged in anti-guerilla activity, destroying two rebel camps in the vicinity of Cowskin Prairie.

=== Wier expedition (July–August 1862) ===
At Baxter Springs, they were reinforced by two more infantry regiments, two cavalry regiments, and a battery of artillery, and were placed under the overall command of Colonel William Wier, to prepare an expedition into Indian Territory. The 9th Wisconsin's commander, Colonel Salomon, was then placed in command of the 1st brigade of the expedition.

The expedition departed June 28, marching toward Fort Gibson. While en route, on July 3, they encountered a force of rebel Indians, who were routed and dispersed. They arrived at Flat Rock Creek on July 9.

There was a significant controversy with quality of Colonel Wier's command; at the request of several of the expedition's subordinate officers, Colonel Salomon relieved Wier of command and arrested him, and returned the expedition to Quapaw Reserve. Several skirmishes took place there with rebel Indians, before proceeding back to Fort Scott, arriving on August 11. At Fort Scott, Wier pursued charges of mutiny against Salomon and the officers who had supported him; General James G. Blunt examined the case and ruled in favor of Colonel Salomon, who was then commissioned brigadier general.

Colonel Salomon's brother, Charles Eberhard Salomon, was then named colonel of the 9th Wisconsin, transferring from the 5th Missouri Infantry Regiment—he would not reach the regiment for several weeks.

During that fall, the 9th Wisconsin Infantry joined an unsuccessful expedition into southwestern Missouri, pursuing the Confederate forces of Joseph O. Shelby and James Edwards Rains, but they were not able to engage the enemy in battle and returned again to Fort Scott.

=== Boston Mountains campaign (September–October 1862) ===
The Union forces in this area were then reorganized as the Army of the Frontier, under General Blunt, and the 9th Wisconsin was organized into the first brigade, under command of their former colonel, General Salomon. With their brigade, they marched to Sarcoxie, Missouri, on September 18, arriving on September 22. At Sarcoxie, the new commander of the 9th Wisconsin, Colonel Charles E. Salomon, joined the regiment.

On September 29, after hearing sounds of battle coming from the direction of Newtonia, Missouri, General Salomon sent four companies of the 9th Wisconsin—companies D, G, E, and H—under the command of Lt. Colonel Arthur Jacobi to assist the Union reconnaissance force in that section under Colonel Edward Lynde of the 9th Kansas Cavalry. The following day, the Wisconsin companies made up the bulk of the infantry for the First Battle of Newtonia. After initial Union success, Confederate reinforcements arrived as the Wisconsin infantry was assaulting the Confederate trench line. They conducted a fighting retreat, but the Wisconsin infantry was overtaken by Confederate cavalry; 28 were killed and 167 were taken prisoner.

Over the next two days, more Union forces arrived in the area, and they advanced again on Newtonia on October 3; the Confederates evacuated before the Union arrival, leaving the captured Wisconsin prisoners to return on parole conditions.

=== Prairie Grove campaign (November–December 1862) ===
For the next two months, the regiment made several marches into northern Arkansas, but did not encounter the enemy. On November 29, they arrived to reinforce General Blunt at Rhea's Mills, Arkansas, just after the Battle of Cane Hill. The 9th Wisconsin, with Salomon's brigade, then occupied Rhea's Mills while Blunt maneuvered to the south, attempting to entice Confederate general Thomas C. Hindman into battle.

On December 7, the battle began with a cavalry encounter at Prairie Grove, Arkansas. In the midst of some initial confusion over the location and disposition of the main Confederate forces, Salomon's brigade was tasked with defending the exposed baggage train near Rhea's Mills. They remained there while the main force of Blunt's army engaged the Confederates at the Battle of Prairie Grove. The battle solidified Union control over northern Arkansas; in the days after the battle, the 9th Wisconsin Infantry returned to Rhea's Mills.

For the next several months, they occupied Rhea's Mills—manufacturing flour and bread there to provision the Union army. They took part in a brief raid on Van Buren, Arkansas, march 60 miles in two days—leaving December 27 and returning December 29.

=== Guard duty in Missouri & Arkansas (February–September 1863) ===
On February 20, 1863, the 9th Wisconsin went quartered at Stahl Creek, and were able to re-integrate their paroled men from Newtonia. They engaged in guard and foraging duty around southern Missouri throughout the spring months.

On July 8, 1863, they were ordered to proceed to St. Louis by railroad, and resumed guard duty there until September 12. On September 12, they were ordered to proceed down the river to Helena, Arkansas. From there, they were ordered on October 10 to march to Little Rock, Arkansas. They took up winter quarters in Little Rock, on October 22, remaining there until March 1864. During that time, they were reorganized into the 1st brigade, 1st division, VII Corps.

During that winter, 230 members of the regiment re-enlisted as veterans and several men were granted furlough to return to Wisconsin in January and February.

=== Camden expedition (March–May 1864) ===
In March, the 9th Wisconsin and VII Corps were ordered to participate in the Camden Expedition, in coordination with the simultaneous Red River campaign. The 9th Wisconsin was assigned to the 1st brigade (Samuel Allen Rice), 3rd division, with their former colonel, Frederick Salomon, now serving as their division commander. They departed from Little Rock on March 23, as the rear-most brigade of the detachment. Their brigade was briefly raided by Confederate general Joseph Shelby in the Skirmish at Terre Noire Creek, but the raid was driven off by the 29th Iowa and 15th Indiana, with artillery support supplied by a battery manned by Company E of the 9th Wisconsin Infantry.

Their brigade then skirmished with Confederate cavalry at the Battle of Elkin's Ferry (April 3–4) and the Battle of Prairie D'Ane (April 9–12). From April 16 to April 23, the 9th Wisconsin was detailed from the brigade to guard the pontoon bridge across the Ouachita River.

When news arrived of the failure of the Red River campaign, Steele ordered VII Corps to return to Little Rock. Salomon's division, with the 9th Wisconsin, was assigned the rearguard, to protect the supply train as it crossed the Saline River at Jenkins' Ferry. The 9th Wisconsin, with its brigade, were entrenched about two miles from the crossing to check the approach of Confederate raiders. Skirmishing began at that location early in the morning on April 30, 1864, in the Battle of Jenkins' Ferry. After the initial skirmishing, the brigade was reinforced. The Confederates made several piecemeal attempts to assault the Union flanks; the brigade commander, General Samuel Rice, was mortally wounded in the fighting and command devolved to the 9th Wisconsin's commander, Colonel Charles Salomon. The Union line held, however, and they were able to extricate their supplies and forces to the north side of the river. During the battle, an enemy flag was taken by members of the 9th Wisconsin's Company B, and sent as a trophy to the governor, James T. Lewis.

The regiment suffered 47 men killed in action and 52 wounded during the expedition.

=== Reorganization and conclusion ===
After returning from the expedition, they were assigned to construct a series of forts around Little Rock. On November 17, 1864, the regiment's original three-year enlistments expired, and the bulk of the regiment mustered out, along with Colonel Salomon. The remaining men were reorganized into an independent battalion of four companies, under the command of Lt. Colonel Jacobi.

The battalion remained at Little Rock for most of the remainder of the war, except for a brief expedition to the Saline River in January 1865, where they lost one man.

In June 1865, they took river transports on the Ouachita River to Camden. They remained at Camden until August, then returned to Little Rock over land, resuming guard duty there. At the time, Lt. Col. Jacobi was appointed provost marshal and judge of the provost court for the Department of Arkansas, and the independent battalion was placed under the command of Captain George Eckhart.

The independent battalion returned to Wisconsin in January 1866, where they were mustered out.

== Commanders ==
- Colonel Frederick Salomon (August 22, 1861 – July 16, 1862) was promoted to brigadier general. After the war he received an honorary brevet to major general. He was the brother of Wisconsin's war-time Governor Edward Salomon.
- Colonel Charles Eberhard Salomon (August 25, 1862 – December 3, 1864) mustered out at the end of his three years service. Earlier in the war, he had served as colonel of the 5th Missouri Infantry Regiment. After the war he received an honorary brevet to brigadier general. He was also a brother of Edward Salomon.
- Lt. Colonel Arthur Jacobi (December 3, 1864 – August 1865) commanded the independent battalion until he was detached as provost marshal at Little Rock.
- Captain George Eckhart (August 1865 – January 1866) commanded the independent battalion and mustered out with them.

Ninth Infantry Original Regimental Staff
| Rank or Position | Name |
|---|---|
| Regimental Colonel | Frederick Salomon |
| Lieutenant Colonel | A. George Wriesberg |
| Major | Henry Orff |
| Adjutant | Arthur Jacob |
| Quartermaster | William Finkler |
| Surgeon | Herman Neumann |
| 1st Asst. Surgeon | Lewis Loehr |
| 2nd Asst. Surgeon | Hermann E. Hesse |
| Chaplain | Rev. John Bantly |

== Total enlistments and casualties ==
The 9th Wisconsin initially mustered 916 men and later recruited an additional 105 men, for a total of 1,021 men. The regiment lost 77 enlisted men killed in action or who later died of their wounds, plus another 114 enlisted men who died of disease, for a total of 191 fatalities.

9th Wisconsin Infantry, Company Organization
| Company | Original Moniker | Primary Place of Recruitment | Captain(s) |
|---|---|---|---|
| A | Sheboygan Tigers | Sheboygan County and Milwaukee County | Frederick Aude (resigned); Charles E. G. Horn (transferred); Henry Stocks (mustered out) |
| B | Salomon Guards | Sheboygan County and Milwaukee County | Frederick Becker (resigned); August F. Dumke (resigned); Adolph Miller (transferred); Gumal Hesse (transferred) |
| C | Wisconsin Light Guard | Sheboygan County and Milwaukee County | George Eckhart (reorg) |
| D | Sauk City Rifles | Sauk County and Crawford County | Charles C. Buckenen (mustered out) |
| E | Burlington Rifles | Milwaukee County and Racine County | Hermann Schleuter (promoted); Edward Ruegger (mustered out) |
| F | Madison Shapshooters | La Crosse County, Dane County, Green County | Dominick Hastreiter (resigned); Martin Voegele (resigned); Carl H. Schmidt (mustered out) |
| G | Sigel Guards | Milwaukee County | John C. G. Harttest (resigned); Frederick Molzner (resigned); Charles Frantz (reorg) |
| H | Wisconsin Yagers (Jäger) | Milwaukee County | Gumal Hesse (transferred to Co. B); John Gerber (mustered out) |
| I | Ozaukee Guards | Milwaukee County | Peter Spehn (resigned); Philip Kruer (mustered out) |
| K | Tell Shapshooters | Green County and Milwaukee County | Henry F. Belitz (resigned); John Gerber (transferred to Co. H); Adolph Miller (reorg) |

9th Wisconsin Reorganized Company Organization
| Company | Captain(s) |
|---|---|
| A | George Eckhart (mustered out) |
| B | Adolph Miller (resigned); David Veidt (mustered out) |
| C | Charles Frantz (mustered out) |
| D | William Schulten (dismissed) |

== Notable people ==
- John Fetzer was enlisted in Co. B and wounded at Jenkins' Ferry. He received an honorary brevet to captain in 1864. After the war he became a Wisconsin state senator.
- Reinhard Schlichting was enlisted in Co. K and promoted to 2nd lieutenant in 1864. He was subsequently commissioned captain of Co. A in the 45th Wisconsin Infantry Regiment. After the war he became a Wisconsin state senator and district attorney.
- Carl Schmidt was 1st lieutenant of Co. G and was promoted to captain of Co. F. He also served as acting quartermaster during 1864. After the war he became a Wisconsin state senator.
- John J. Senn was enlisted in Co. H and transferred to Co. D after the regiment was reorganized. After the war he became a Wisconsin state legislator.

== See also ==
- List of Wisconsin Civil War units
- Wisconsin in the American Civil War
