= Wasatch Mountain Club Lodge =

- U.S. National Register of Historic Places
- Location within Utah Location within the United States
- Nearest city: Salt Lake City, Utah
- Coordinates: 40.595951°N 111.584787°W
- Built: 1929-30
- Architectural style: log Cabin
- NRHP reference No.: 80003935
- Added to NRHP: November 10, 1980

The Wasatch Mountain Club Lodge, near Salt Lake City, Utah, is a log cabin built in 1929–30. It was listed on the National Register of Historic Places in 1980.

It is located on U.S. Forest Service land at the head of Big Cottonwood Canyon, on what is now Mary Lake Lane, in Brighton, Utah, about 25 miles (40 km) southeast of Salt Lake City. It is near the trailhead to Mary Lake.

It is a two-story rustic log cabin lodge.

It overlooks the Brighton Bowl, what is now the Brighton Ski Resort area; the ski resort developed starting from one rope tow established in 1936.

The historic designation recognizes the building as one of few structures surviving from the earliest years of skiing in Utah. The lodge was used for club events and public rentals. In December 2010 the Wasatch Mountain Club transferred the building to a non-profit foundation that will manage the building for the public as an historic site with access through open houses, scheduled use for educational and cultural events, and private reservations for a cost-based fee.
