= Theodore Bruback =

American industrialist (1851–1904)

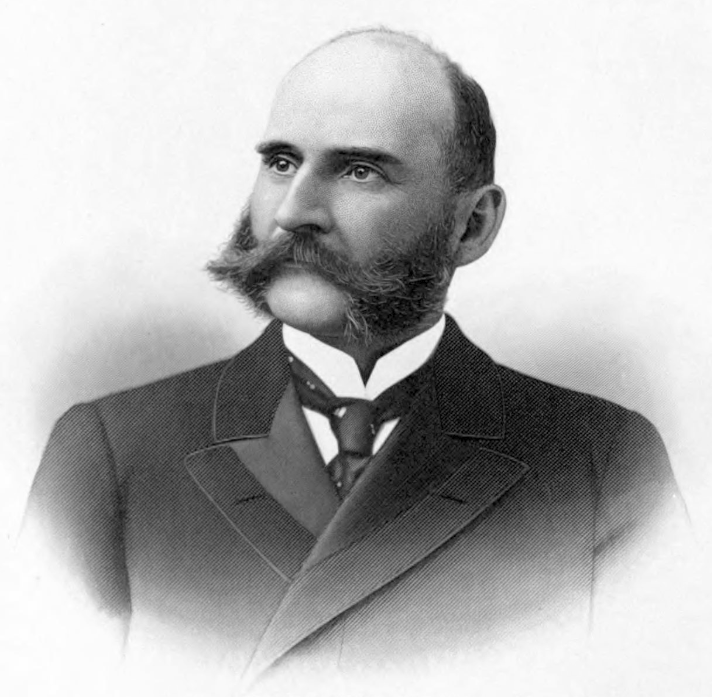
- Born: March 7, 1851; Pittsburgh, Pennsylvania, U.S.
- Died: February 18, 1904 (aged 52); Park City, Utah, U.S.

Signature
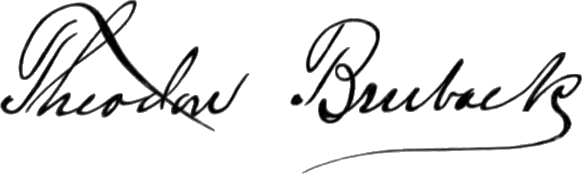

Theodore Bruback (March 7, 1851 – February 18, 1904) was a wealthy and well-known figure in Utah's mining and railroad industries.

== Life ==
Theodore Bruback was born in Pittsburgh, Allegheny County, Pennsylvania, on March 7, 1851, and spent his early life in Pennsylvania. His family were originally natives of Alsace–Lorraine. His father, David, came to American as a young man, from Bruback, a small town in his native province, named after the family. He engaged in the iron business in Pittsburgh and amassed considerable wealth. Theodore Bruback's mother, Anna Kunigunda Dietrich, was also of German descent, her parents being among the first settlers of Pennsylvania. Theodore Bruback was educated in the common schools and high schools of Allegheny County and later attended the Iron City College, graduating in 1866.

Upon the completion of his education, Bruback assisted in developing the oil fields of Pennsylvania in the vicinity of Pittsburgh. He was a member of the firm of Reed & Co., and engaged in the oil business in Pennsylvania until 1877. During his business career in Pennsylvania he acquired interests in many enterprises. In some of these he was interested as a capitalist and in some as their organizer and promoter.

Bruback traveled west in 1877 and engaged in the mining and stock business in Wyoming Territory, where he was one of the pioneers for eight years, interested in all the industries of the state. While there he located and developed the "Sun Rise" and "Blue Jay" mines, which he successfully operated for a number of years. He settled at Salt Lake City in 1886, becoming interested in the mining possibilities of Utah, and in addition to his mining properties secured large holdings in railroads. During that year he was married in Westfield, New York, to Jessie White McLane, daughter of Colonel John W. McClane, who died in the American Civil War, and after whom the Grand Army of the Republic Post at Erie, Pennsylvania, was named. Bruback had two children, Theodore McClane and Jessie Elizabeth. His family was prominent in the social circles of Salt Lake City.

From the time of Bruback's arrival in Utah he was one of the state's busiest men, probably engaged in promoting as many diversified interests as any other resident of Utah. He developed not only gold and silver mines, but coal mines, stone quarries and water companies, as well as building railroads.

The Sanpete Valley Railway was constructed in 1882. Bruback became its president and general manager in 1887, when it was a poorly constructed, badly equipped, narrow-gauge "streak of rust," which had been unprofitable from its construction until that time. Bruback took over this property (only 20 miles (32 km) in length), broadened the gauge, reconstructed it entirely and extended it, until by 1904 it had become a standard-gauge, well constructed and finely equipped railway, some 60 miles (97 km) in length, doing a profitable business, with prospects of future growth. The Sanpete Valley Railway was among the first companies to undertake the development of southern Utah, and Bruback's administration of the company's affairs and development of the territory tributary to its route made him one of the most successful businessmen in the state.

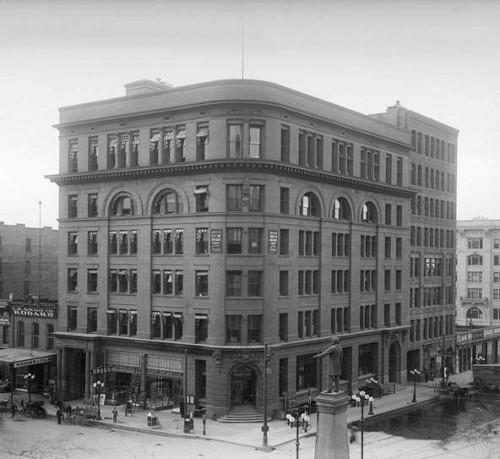
The Deseret News building in 1911

Bruback developed a coal mine at Morrison, the terminus of the Sanpete Valley Railway, after almost insurmountable difficulties, and made a profitable enterprise out of it. He developed the Nebo Brown Stone Quarry, of which he was the chief owner, building a branch of the Sanpete Valley Railway to the quarry, and placed upon the market the finest brown stone found west of the Rocky Mountains; a fact attested by what he termed his monument—the Deseret News building, in its time considered one of the finest buildings west of the Mississippi River.

Bruback also created the Gold Belt Water Company, which supplied the mines, mills and town of Mercur, Utah (now a ghost town), with water, making it possible to live there and operate mines in an economical manner. The great difficulty that confronted the mines and mills of Mercur was the want of water, and although it was necessary to raise it over an altitude of 1,500 feet (460 m), through miles of pipe, in order to get it into Mercur, and notwithstanding the difficulty was pronounced insurmountable by engineers and mining men, Bruback accomplished the task. The Gold Belt Water Company enabled Mercur to produce millions of gold annually. In addition to this, Bruback developed and was chief owner of many mines in Utah and Idaho. He had large real estate interests in Salt Lake City and other parts of the state.

In politics Bruback believed in the principles of the Republican Party. He was appointed aide-de-camp on the staff of Governor Heber Manning Wells, with the rank of lieutenant colonel, by which appointment he received his title. He was a member of the Masonic fraternity. On December 29, 1889, he was elected to Salt Lake City's Alta Club. At the beginning of 1904 he was 52 years old, in excellent health, and seemed certain to be engaged for many years to come in furthering the establishment of large enterprises in Utah. But it was not to be. On February 18, 1904, while inspecting the Daly-West mine in Park City, Utah, Bruback lost his grip while climbing a ladder and fell 15 feet (4.6 m), breaking his neck.
