= Charles Eberhard Salomon =

Union Army colonel

Charles E. Salomon
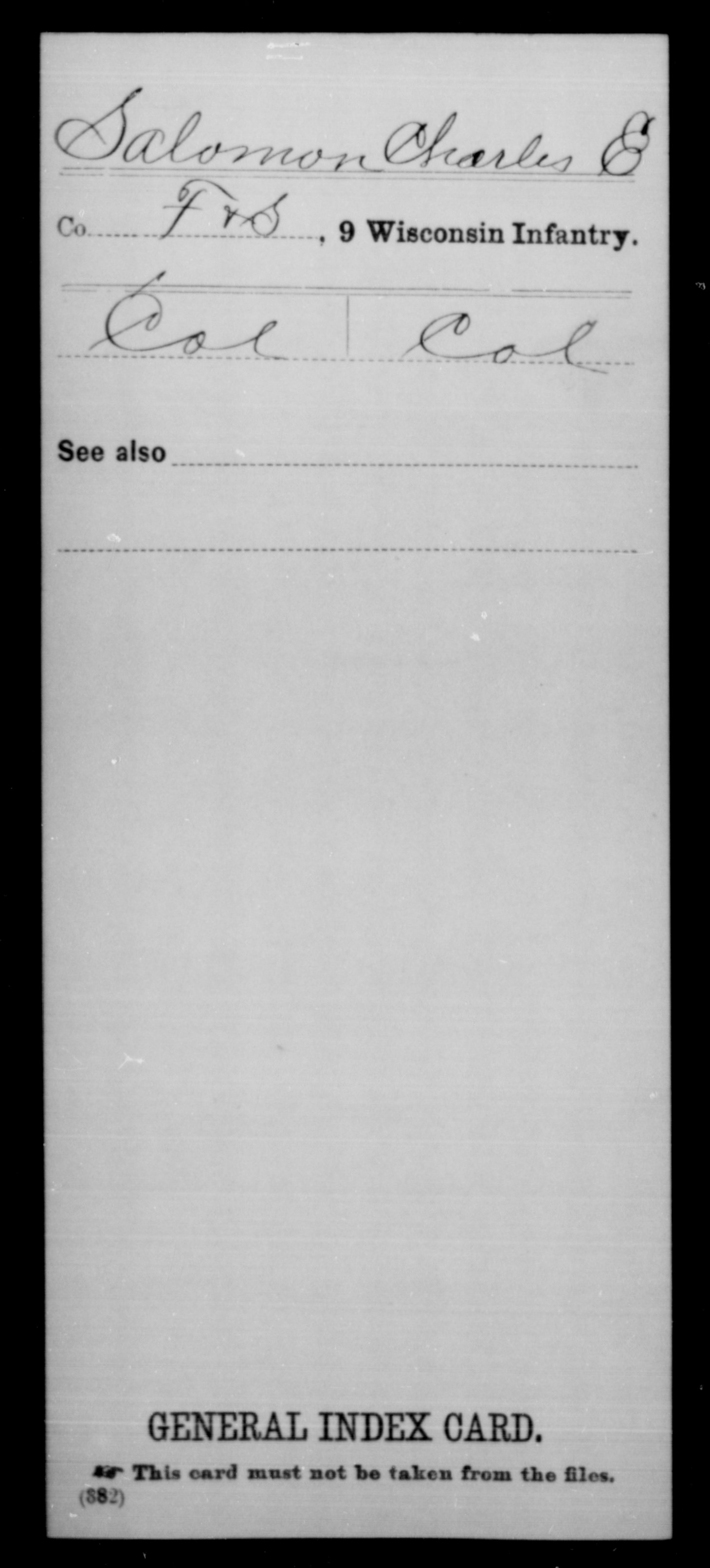
- The Index Card for Colonel Charles E. Salomon, 9th Wisconsin Infantry Regiment.
- Born: June 24, 1824; Halberstadt, Province of Saxony, Prussia
- Died: January 9, 1881 (aged 56); Salt Lake City, Utah, U.S.
- Burial place: Mount Olivet Cemetery, Salt Lake City
- Spouse: Alvina Pitzman (died 1879)
- Children: 3
- Relatives: Edward Salomon (brother); Frederick Salomon (brother)
- Military career
- Allegiance: United States
- Branch: United States Volunteers; Union Army
- Service years: 1861–1864
- Rank: Colonel, USV; Brevet Brig. General, USV
- Commands: 5th Reg. Mo. Vol. Infantry; 9th Reg. Wis. Vol. Infantry
- Conflicts: American Civil War

Charles Eberhard Salomon (June 24, 1824 – January 9, 1881) was a German American immigrant, surveyor, and civil engineer. He served as a colonel in the Union Army during the American Civil War and received an honorary brevet to brigadier general after the war. He was a brother of Wisconsin's wartime governor Edward Salomon.

== Biography ==
Salomon was born on June 24, 1824, in Prussia. He moved with his three brothers to the United States in the 1840s, settling in Manitowoc, Wisconsin. One brother, Frederick, became a brigadier general in the Union Army. Another brother, Edward, became Governor of Wisconsin. Salomon married Alvina Pitzman and they had three children. He died on January 9, 1881, in Salt Lake City, Utah.

In 1927, a monument to Salomon and his three brothers was erected at the Manitowoc County Courthouse.

== Career ==
Salomon and his brothers, Frederick and Herman, joined the Army in 1861 after the outbreak of the Civil War. Charles Salomon was appointed captain of the 5th Missouri Volunteer Infantry on May 4, 1861, and two weeks later, on May 18, 1861, he was promoted to colonel. Not long after, he took part in the Battle of Carthage. Salomon was mustered out of the volunteers on August 26, 1861.

Salomon rejoined the army on September 26, 1862, as colonel of the 9th Wisconsin Infantry Regiment and succeeded Frederick, who had been promoted to brigadier general of volunteers, in commanding the regiment. He would lead the 9th Wisconsin Infantry in the First Battle of Newtonia, the Battle of Prairie Grove, the Battle of Helena and the Battle of Jenkins' Ferry. He was mustered out of the volunteers again on December 3, 1864. On January 13, 1866, President Andrew Johnson nominated Salomon for appointment to the grade of brevet brigadier general of volunteers to rank from March 13, 1865, and the United States Senate confirmed the appointment on March 12, 1866.

== See also ==
- List of American Civil War brevet generals (Union)
