= Development of skiing in Utah =

Skiing in Utah is a thriving industry which contributes greatly to the state’s economy. Skiing started in Park City and Alta as miners used skis to get around in snowy weather, but since the 1930s, it has increasingly developed into a substantial industry, which creates thousands of jobs and brings in millions of dollars in revenue.

The ski industry adds much to Utah’s economy, in particular its tourist industry, which includes several year-round outdoor activities, such as hiking, trekking, mountain climbing, and mountain biking. Utah’s seven major ski resorts, Alta, Brighton, Deer Valley, Park City, Snowbird, Solitude, and Sundance, are located in the Wasatch Range; however there are several others scattered throughout the state such as Beaver Mountain, Brian Head, Cherry Peak Resort, Eagle Point Ski Resort, Powder Mountain, Snowbasin and Wolf Mountain.

== History ==
=== Pre-war (1900 to 1930s) ===
In the early nineteenth century, skiing simply started off as a way for people to move from one point to another, especially, in snowy winter months with limited mobility. The first persons who used skis were trappers, miners and mountain dwellers. In mining towns such as Alta, which on average received five-hundred inches on snow per year, skis were an essential means of transportation.

As skiing developed, it became a popular recreational activity. All through the Wasatch Range, ski clubs and trails were created, which attracted skiers, hikers, and climbers. The Wasatch Mountain Club, founded by Charles T. Stoney in 1912, was the most successful of the first clubs. Skiing expeditions throughout the Wasatch mountains near Park City, Brighton, and Alta were organized and the first touring groups were established. During the late 1910s and 1920s, the Wasatch Mountain Club started to expand their touring groups which extended as far as Ogden.

During the 1920s, the ski touring industry continued to expand. Short trips lasting from two to four days were popular in the Brighton area. Early on, because of the sport's extreme nature, public opinion of skiing portrayed it as a dangerous, largely because skis and cold-weather apparel were hand-made and primitive. Later, once equipment and apparel improved, the public opinion of skiing improved as well.

By the 1930s, the sport evolved and professional ski jump meets were organized. Becker Hill started hosting professional meets which attracted thousands of spectators. The attention of these events sparked the expansion of other ski areas, such as Rasmussen's Ranch in Parley's Canyon and Ecker Hill. In 1937, the National ski jumping championship was held at Ecker Hill, after the Utah Ski Club and the Salt Lake Chamber of Commerce raised thirty-five hundred dollars for the event. Between eight and nine thousand spectators attended the Championship.

The New Deal provided public work relief programs such as the Civilian Conservation Corps Highways which constructed highways to ski resorts, such as Alta and Brighton. Also at this time, the first uphill tows were created. These new highways and improved technologies expanded the ski industry further, and more jobs were created, which mitigated the effects of the Great Depression.

In 1938, the first ski lift was constructed by businessman Joe Quinney and his partners with the hopes that it would transform the ski industry in Utah. During the first year the lift was plagued with problems and only operated sporadically, but later modifications greatly improved the lifts which allowed beginners and experienced skiers to go up and down the mountains with ease. Other resorts such as Brighton, Snow Basin, and Cache Valley soon followed and added their own ski lifts. The efficiency of the lifts propelled the advancement of other new skiing inventions, like poles, adjustable bindings, sealskin climbers, ski wax, water-resistant clothing, and goggles.

In the 1940s, skiing in Utah expanded drastically. In 1914, only a few people skied and no modern-day resorts existed, but in 1940, it was recorded that over 190,000 had visited ski resorts in Utah. The era of lift-served skiing came to Park City with local skiing enthusiasts Otto Carpenter and Bob Burns building a ski lift and a warming hut at Snow Park Resort in 1946. The resort operated on weekends and holidays until it closed in 1969. The site of the Snow Park Resort is now Deer Valley Resort.

In 1941, when the United States entered World War II, the demand for skiing and other recreational activities decreased. Many, but not all, ski resorts were converted into training camps for paratroopers and specific rescue groups of the U.S. military. The resorts that were reserved for recreation were commonly used for alpine skiing.

Alpine skiing increased in popularity and more competitions were created. For example, Alta started the famous Snow Cup tournament in 1940 and Snowbasin hosted the US National downhill slalom and combined ski championships in 1947. The 1948 US Winter Olympic team included a large contingent of Utah skiers.

During the latter part of the war, winter recreation surged in popularity once again and ski resorts were often operating at full capacity. Alta and Brighton alone received 44,000 skiers during the 1944–45 winter season. After World War II, state officials promoted Utah's slopes more than ever, producing the film "Ski Aces" which was shown to millions throughout the United States. The film was the first official, far-reaching advertising campaign. State government conducted research at this time which concluded that winter sports recreation brought in two and a half times more revenue than summer recreation leading to even more money spent on advertising. In the 1960s, the Utah Travel Council claimed that "Utah possesses some of the finest skiing terrain in the world." The council made brochures advertising which resorts were the best and created labels such as "Romantic Alta" and "Beautiful Brighton."

==== "Ski Utah" ====
D. James Cannon, known as Jim Cannon, first came up with the "Ski Utah!" brand, which caught on with skiing fans and boosted Utah's tourism industry. Shortly after, he coined the slogan "The Greatest Snow on Earth" — the phrase that was eventually printed on Utah license plates in 1985. The Travel Council exhibited these ski slogans on many billboards all over the state and created advertisements which were displayed at extreme sport conferences in Los Angeles, Oakland, Chicago, and New Jersey. The "Ski Utah!" brand captured over four percent of the ski market, and by the end of the century, it increased to 5.5 percent market. By 1972, tourism was ranked as the second largest industry in Utah and generated nearly $209 million per year for the state.

==== Utahn Inc. ====
To get more Utahns interested in the development of the tourist industry, Utahn Inc. was created, which consisted of the chamber of commerce, various hotels, transportation and touring companies, amusement parks, ski resorts, and park agencies. This organization was successful in promoting economic activity in the state and was largely responsible for developing Park City's Ski industry. In 1962, it helped the United Park City Mines company stay afloat and helped build the Treasure Mountain Ski resort, which was eventually renamed as the Park City Mountain Resort. The advertising eventually paid off; ski visits increased from 195,000 in 1960 to 649,000 in 1970.

==== Changing laws ====
Utah's culture, which has much of its history rooted in the Mormon religion, enacted Utah liquor laws that limited the availability of alcohol. Since Utah felt they needed to compete with Colorado's ski industry, they decided to establish new liquor laws for the purpose of attracting more tourists. The new laws did what they were designed to do—they drew in many more tourists. Utah ski promoters spent over $50 million on advertisements every year to compete with Colorado, and In 1989, Utah ranked fourth in the Rocky Mountain region for attracting the most tourists to their state, right behind Colorado, Arizona, and Nevada).

=== Impact of the 2002 Olympics ===
Dick Ebersol, Chairman of NBC Sports stated this in regards to the Salt Lake Olympic Winter Games: "Far and away, the most successful Olympics, summer or winter, in history."

Salt Lake City's 2002 Winter Olympics led to an economic boom for Utah's ski industry. Skier visits rose 42% from 2002-2011 including a 70% growth in out-of-state skiers from 2002-2011. In total, foreign and U.S. visitors grew from 17.3 million to 20.2 million (in 2010) and direct expenditures from skiers and snowboarders resulted in a 67% increase in revenue for Utah of $704 million in 2002-03 to $1.2 billion in 2010-11. Moreover, the Utah Olympic Legacy Foundation also distributed over $120 million in sports related programs and operations at Utah Olympic Oval in Kearns and Utah Olympic Park near Park City.

Since hosting the 2002 Winter Games, Utah has hosted over 60 World Cup events as well as 7 world championships and numerous other sporting events. Following the Olympic games, Utah has become a training hub for 38 USA world-class athletes, including 13 athletes from the state.

== Future developments ==
In 2013, Vail Resorts signed a 50-year lease agreement to operate Canyons Resort, the largest ski resort in Utah. In 2014, Vail purchased Canyons Resort's neighbor, Park City Mountain Resort from Powdr Corporation. Since the acquisition, the Colorado-based resort has connected Park City to The Canyons — a plan which has been estimated to cost $50 million for an interconnect gondola and other upgrades - and created the largest ski resort in the United States, with over 7,300 acres for skiing and snowboarding.

In 2014, Ski Utah formed a project called One Wasatch. This projects plans to team up with seven Wasatch Range ski resorts just east of Salt Lake City: Alta, Brighton, Canyons, Deer Valley, Park City, Snowbird, and Solitude. Their objective is to create the largest network of ski resorts in North America with 100 lifts, 750 runs and 18,000 acres to explore. The cost of the project is estimated at $30 million for new lifts and improved infrastructure.

However, One Wasatch is opposed by a group called "Save Our Canyons" who seek to protect the Wasatch Front from further developments that could be detrimental to the environment, especially considering that both the Cottonwood Canyons are watersheds for the Salt Lake Valley. One Wasatch is also opposed by the local backcountry skiing community as the Wasatch is one of the most popular locations in the United States and One Wasatch would allow access to terrain that skiers would normally need to be able to ski tour in order to ski down.

=== Climate change ===
Climate change is a global problem which directly affects the core of the ski industry. Resorts have adjusted to the climate changes over the years by implementing new technologies, like, snow-making machines, that enable resorts to stay open longer. Comparing records since 1999, the NRDC reported that Utah had 14 percent fewer skiers in low snow fall winters compared to heavy snowfall winters; that it cost the state $87 million in revenue and 1,000 jobs were lost; and that future projections estimate that the ski industry will lose 27,000 jobs and $1 billion in revenue due to decreasing snow.

== Summer resorts ==
Occasionally, some resorts are able to stay open into the summer if there is enough snow to continue operating, most frequently Snowbird because of its microclimate for snow retention. With decreasing snow levels, most resorts have limited operations through the summer and have invested in summer activities, which include miniature golfing, alpine slides/coasters, climbing walls for kids, zip-lines, and several hiking and biking trails.

== Employment ==
The Winter sports industry has proven to be an asset to Utah's economy, attracting nonresidents and bringing in new out-of-state dollars to the economy every year. In the latest RRC Associates survey on Skiing in Utah, they estimated that skiers and snowboarders spent about $1.29 billion in the 2012/13 season—a 10% increase from the previous year. Of the $1.29 billion spent, $1.1 billion was spent by nonresident skiers and snowboarders. Based on data calculated by BEBR, the ski industry provided 18,419 direct, indirect and induced full- and part-time winter sports-related jobs during the month of February 2013.

Many of the top winter sports events come to Utah because of the variety of world-class venues that were constructed during the 2002 Olympics. As a result, thousands of additional tourists travel here, which again creates hundreds of seasonal jobs for Utah's economy. Laura Shaw of the Utah Sports Commission, a non-profit organization created by the state to attract sporting events, estimated that winter sporting events brought in $27.3 million for the state in 2013. Events are held all over Utah including Park City, Salt Lake City, and Kerns.
