= Economy of Utah =

The economy of Utah is a diversified economy covering industries such as tourism, mining, agriculture, manufacturing, information technology, finance, and petroleum production. The majority of Utah's gross state product is produced along the Wasatch Front, containing the state capital Salt Lake City.

According to the Bureau of Economic Analysis, Utah's gross state product in 2024 was $300.9 billion, ranking 28th largest in the nation; per capita personal income was $66,443.

Major industries of Utah include: recreation (8 billion 2022), coal mining, cattle ranching, salt production, and government services.

According to the 2007 State New Economy Index, Utah is ranked the top state in the nation for Economic Dynamism, determined by:

The degree to which state economies are knowledge-based, globalized, entrepreneurial, information technology-driven, and innovation-based.

In eastern Utah, petroleum production is a major industry. Near Salt Lake City, petroleum refining is done by a number of oil companies. In central Utah, coal production accounts for much of the mining activity.

Utah collects personal income tax at a single rate of 5%, but provides tax credits to low and middle income taxpayers to provide a progressive tax system. The state sales tax has a base rate of 4.65 percent, with cities and counties levying additional local sales taxes that vary among the municipalities. Property taxes are assessed and collected locally. Utah does not charge intangible property taxes and does not impose an inheritance tax. Over time and influenced by climate change, droughts in Utah have been increasing in frequency and severity, putting a further strain on Utah's water security and impacting the state's economy.

== Farming ==
Farming plays an extremely important role in rural Utah. Crops like corn and barley can be produced despite the dry land. Cultivated land, including isolated farms in river valleys and considerable dry farming acreage, is limited to a small percentage of the state's total area. The bulk of income from agriculture comes from livestock and livestock products, including sheep, cattle, dairying, and an expanding poultry industry. Abundant sunshine provides some compensation for inadequate rainfall, and the climate is generally moderate, allowing for substantial fruit production.

== Tourism ==
Tourism is a major industry in Utah, as it is well known for its year-round outdoor recreational activities. With five national parks (Arches, Bryce Canyon, Canyonlands, Capitol Reef, and Zion), Utah has the third most national parks of any state after Alaska and California. In addition, Utah features seven national monuments, two national recreation areas, six national forests, and numerous state parks and monuments.

Utah is well known for its winter activities and has seen an increase in tourism since the 2002 Winter Olympics. Beginning in 1939, with the establishment of Alta Ski Area, Utah's skiing has become world-renowned. Park City is home to the United States Ski Team. Utah's ski resorts are primarily located in northern Utah near Salt Lake City, Park City, Ogden, and Provo. In 2008, for a second year in a row, Deer Valley, in Park City, was ranked the top ski resort in North America by more than 20,000 subscribers of Ski Magazine. In addition to having prime snow conditions and world-class amenities, Northern Utah's ski resorts are well liked among tourists for their convenience and proximity to a large city and International Airport, as well as the close proximity to other ski resorts, allowing skiers the ability to ski at multiple locations in one day.

The 2002 Winter Olympics were celebrated in Utah and offered a great boon to the economy of the state. Several facilities were built to accommodate the influx of tourism that accompanied and lingered after the Olympics. Former Olympic venues including Utah Olympic Park and Utah Olympic Oval are still in operation for training and competition and allows the public to participate in numerous activities including ski jumping, bobsleigh, and speed skating.

Utah features many cultural attractions such as Temple Square in Salt Lake, the Sundance Film Festival in Park City, and the Utah Shakespearean Festival in Cedar City.

Other attractions include Monument Valley, the Great Salt Lake, the Bonneville Salt Flats, and Lake Powell.

== Mining ==
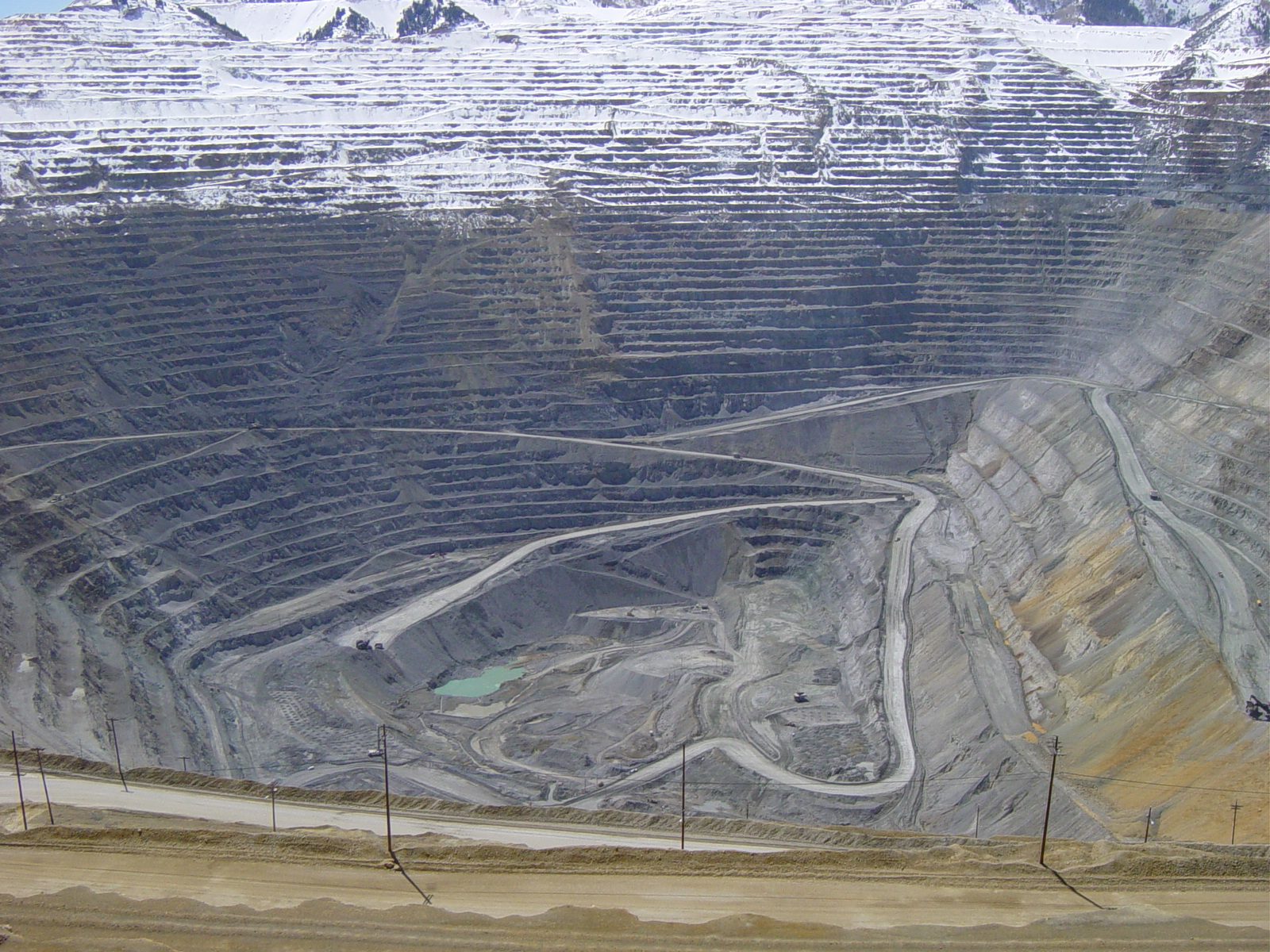
Bingham Canyon Mine southwest of Salt Lake City

Beginning in the late 19th century with the state's mining boom (including the Bingham Canyon Mine, among the world's largest open pit mines), companies attracted large numbers of immigrants with job opportunities. Since the days of the Utah Territory mining has played a major role in Utah's economy. Historical mining towns include Mercur in Tooele County, Silver Reef in Washington County, Eureka in Juab County, Park City in Summit County and numerous coal mining camps throughout Carbon County such as Castle Gate, Spring Canyon, and Hiawatha. These settlements were characteristic of the boom and bust cycle that dominated mining towns of the American West. During the early part of the Cold War era, uranium was mined in eastern Utah. Today mining activity still plays a major role in the state's economy. Minerals mined in Utah include copper, gold, silver, molybdenum, zinc, lead, and beryllium. Fossil fuels including coal, petroleum, and natural gas continue to play a major role in Utah's economy, especially in the eastern part of the state in counties such as Carbon, Emery, Grand, and Uintah.

== Energy ==
=== Wind power ===
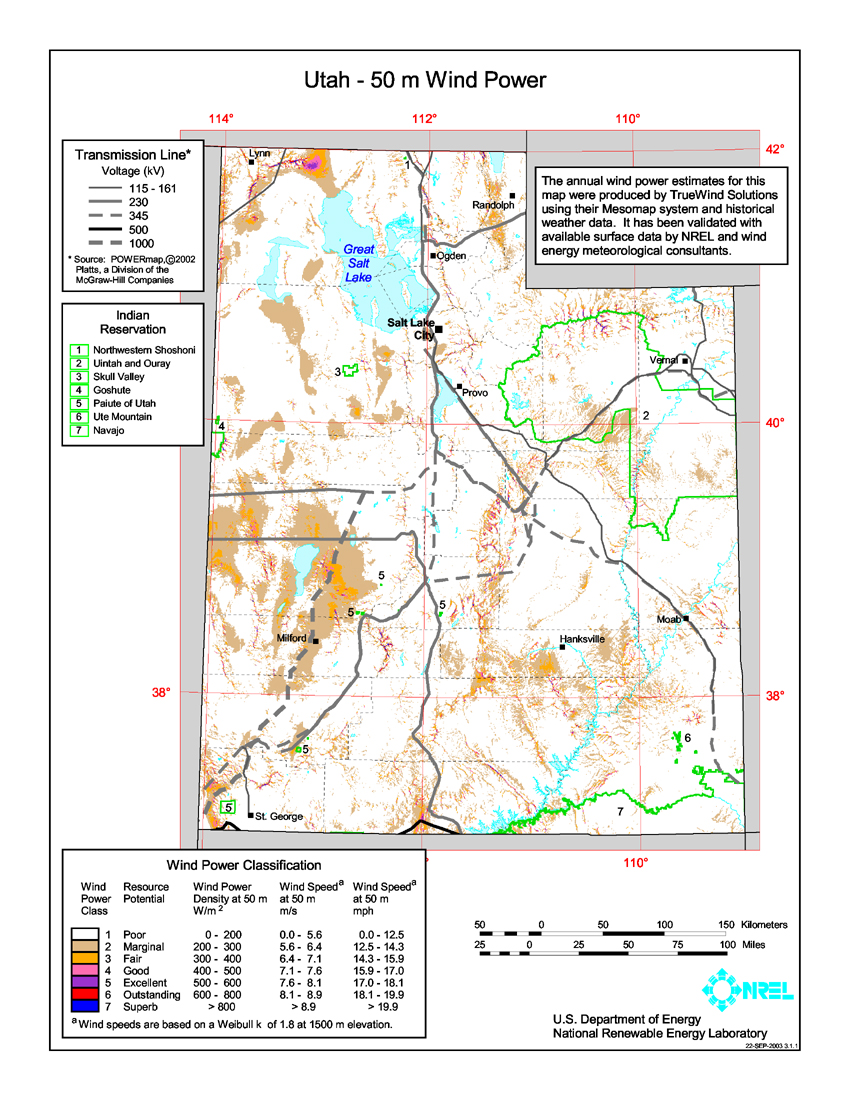
2003 map of wind potential in Utah by United States Department of Energy National Renewable Energy Laboratory

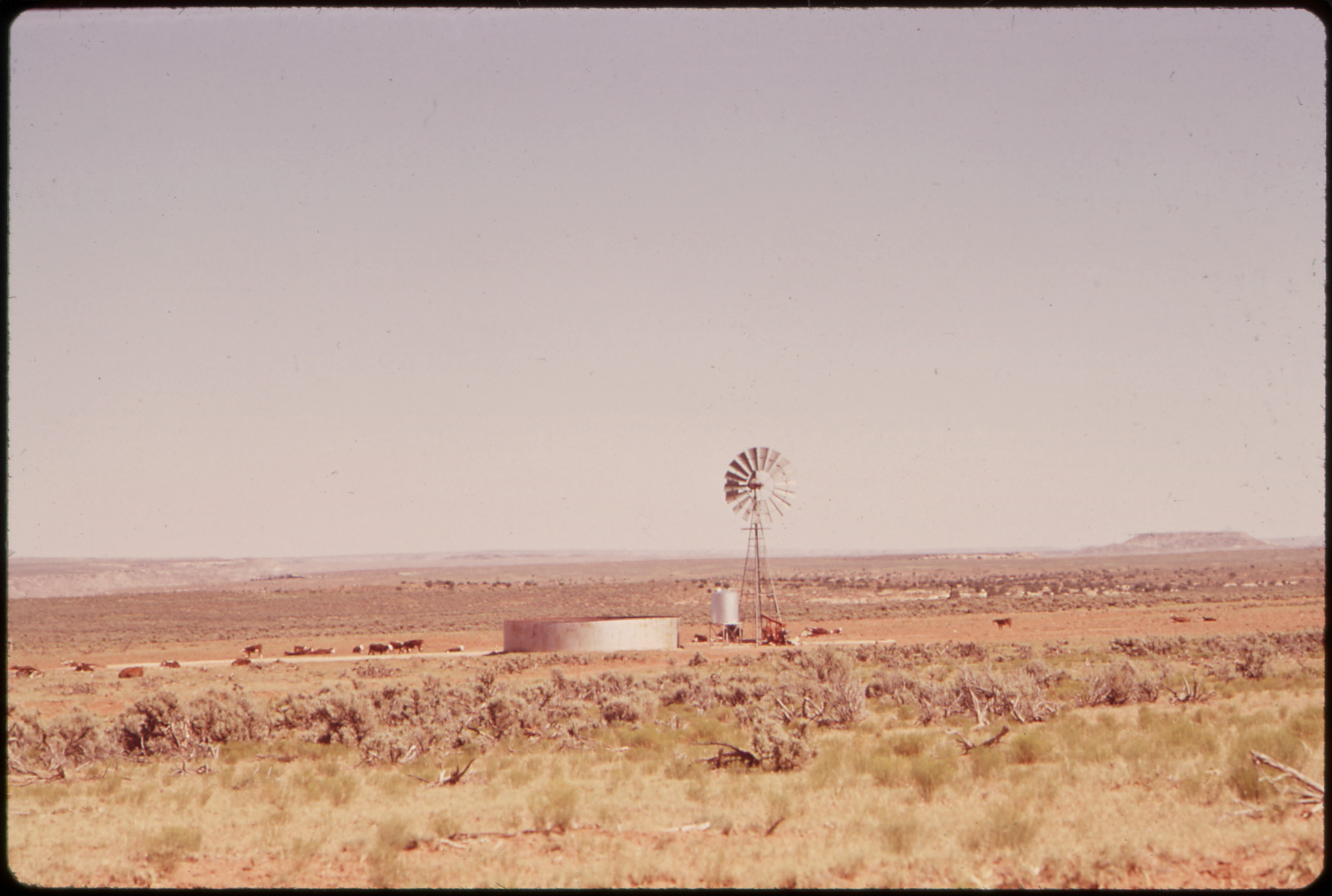
Waterpump in southeastern Utah, 1972

Wind power in Utah is in the early stages of development. As of 2016 the state had 391 MW of wind generation capacity, responsible for 2.6% of in-state electricity generation. Wind thus plays a small role in the state's renewable portfolio standard goals.

A 2009 Utah Renewable Energy Zone Taskforce estimated that the state could produce over 9,000 megawatts of wind power. As about 80% of Utah's population is concentrated along the foot of the Wasatch Front mountain range, reliable and predictable canyon winds offer opportunities for wind power generation and efficient wind energy distribution without long-distance transmission.

Utah Power, now PacifiCorp, launched the Blue Sky Program in 2000 to encourage users to purchase imported wind power, with the option of purchasing 100-kilowatt hour (kWh) "blocks" of renewable energy for a monthly fee through their electricity bills. In 2003, radio station KZMU in southeast Utah began operating solely on wind power. Kinkos also participates. PacifiCorp, the major provider in Utah, imports much of its renewable energy into the state and does not intend to build instate facilities before at least 2024.
