= Edward Salomon =

American politician (1828–1909)

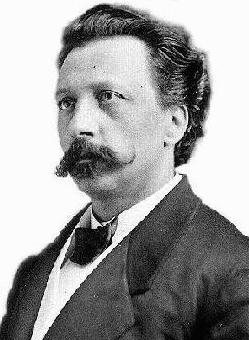

8th Governor of Wisconsin
- Acting
- In office April 19, 1862 – January 4, 1864
- Lieutenant Governor: himself
- Preceded by: Louis P. Harvey
- Succeeded by: James T. Lewis

8th Lieutenant Governor of Wisconsin
- In office January 6, 1862 – January 4, 1864
- Governor: Louis P. Harvey
- Preceded by: Butler G. Noble
- Succeeded by: Wyman Spooner

Personal details
- Born: August 11, 1828 Ströbeck, Province of Saxony, Prussia (now Germany)
- Died: April 21, 1909 (aged 80) Frankfurt, Germany
- Resting place: Old Jewish Cemetery, Frankfurt
- Party: Democratic (before 1860); Republican (1860–1909)
- Spouse: Elise Nebel
- Relatives: Charles Eberhard Salomon (brother); Frederich Salomon (brother); Edward S. Salomon (cousin)
- Education: University of Berlin

Edward Salomon (August 11, 1828 – April 21, 1909) was a German American immigrant, lawyer, Republican politician, and Wisconsin pioneer. He was the 8th governor of Wisconsin and the first Jewish governor of Wisconsin. He was elected lieutenant governor in 1861 and ascended to the gubernatorial office after the accidental drowning of governor Louis P. Harvey, serving nearly all of Harvey's gubernatorial term. Salomon led Wisconsin through the tumultuous 1862–1863 period of the American Civil War, raising and equipping 14 new regiments and dealing with draft riots and domestic unrest—which ultimately cost him renomination in 1863.

While Salomon was governor, his brothers, Charles Eberhard Salomon and Frederick Salomon, were Union Army generals in the American Civil War. Their cousin, Edward S. Salomon, was also a Union Army officer and later governor of the Washington Territory.

== Early life ==
Salomon was born in Ströbeck, in the Province of Saxony, in what was then the Kingdom of Prussia. He was the son of Dorothea (Klussman) and Christoph Salomon. He attended the University of Berlin, but as a sympathizer with the contemporary German revolution, fled the country in 1849. He emigrated to the United States and settled in Manitowoc, Wisconsin, which had a large German American immigrant population. In Manitowoc, he worked as a schoolteacher and surveyor, and served as deputy circuit court clerk. In 1852 he moved to Milwaukee, where he read law and was admitted to the bar in 1855. He formed a law practice in partnership with Winfield Smith that endured for more than 15 years. Salomon was Jewish and a cousin of Edward S. Salomon, the future governor of the Washington Territory who was considered to be one of the highest-ranking Jewish heroes in the American Civil War.

== Career ==
In 1860, to support Abraham Lincoln for the presidency, Salomon changed his party affiliation from Democratic to Republican. In 1861 he was nominated by the Republican Party on their Union Party ticket as candidate for lieutenant governor. He ultimately won the election by a narrow margin. In 1862, when Governor Louis P. Harvey drowned, Salomon became Wisconsin's first German-born and first Jewish governor.

In 1862 Governor Salomon responded to a request from the War Department for more troops by asking for volunteers and setting up a draft. He was able to raise 14 regiments. Salomon had to call up federal troops to quell the Port Washington Draft Riot. Suppression of the rioters with use of federal troops cost him the 1863 Republican nomination.

In 1864, Salomon resumed his law practice in Milwaukee. In 1869 he moved to New York City, where he continued his law practice for a number of years as legal representative for various important German interests. When he retired in 1894, he returned to Germany and lived there until his death.

== Death ==
Salomon died April 21, 1909, in Germany at Frankfurt am Main.

== Family ==
Salomon married Elise Nebel. He had three brothers, Charles Eberhard Salomon, Frederich Salomon, and Herman Salomon, all of whom were involved in the American Civil War.

Salomon's brothers, Frederick Salomon and Charles Eberhard Salomon, served as officers in the Union Army. On July 18, 1862, Frederick was appointed by President Abraham Lincoln as a brigadier general of volunteers to rank from July 16, 1862. President Lincoln submitted the nomination to the U.S. Senate on May 17, 1862, and the Senate confirmed the appointment on July 16, 1862. Charles served as colonel of the 5th Missouri Volunteer Infantry (3 months, 1861) and on September 26, 1862, rejoined the army and succeeded Frederick as colonel of the 9th Wisconsin Volunteer Infantry Regiment. On March 13, 1865, his cousin Edward S. Salomon was made a brigadier general for his "distinguished gallantry and meritorious service." On January 13, 1866, President Andrew Johnson nominated Charles Eberhard Salomon for appointment to the grade of brevet brigadier general of volunteers to rank from March 13, 1865, and the Senate confirmed the appointment on March 12, 1866.

== See also ==
- Prussia and the American Civil War
- List of United States governors born outside the United States

Party political offices
Preceded by Butler Noble	Republican nominee for Lieutenant Governor of Wisconsin; 1861	Succeeded by Wyman Spooner
Political offices
Preceded by Butler Noble	Lieutenant Governor of Wisconsin; 1862	Succeeded by Wyman Spooner
Preceded by Louis P. Harvey	Governor of Wisconsin; 1862–1864	Succeeded by James T. Lewis
