= Wasatch Mountain Club =

- Formation: August 1913 (informal), May 13, 1920 (official)
- Founder: Seven original participants (informal), Thirteen charter members (official)
- Type: Recreational outdoor club
- Purpose: Promoting physical and spiritual well-being through outdoor activities, uniting enthusiasts of Utah wilderness, and encouraging nature preservation
- Location: Salt Lake City, Utah
- Members: Open to all adults
- Publication: "Onward and Upward" (official history)
- Website: The Wasatch Mountain Club - Club website

The Wasatch Mountain Club is a recreational outdoor club for adults based in Salt Lake City, Utah. It is a non-profit organization and has no restrictions on who may join. Some of its missions are:

- To promote the physical and spiritual well-being through outdoor activities;
- to unite the energy, knowledge, and interests of students, explorers and lovers of the Utah wilderness;
- to encourage the preservation of nature.

== History ==
The club was officially founded on the 13 May 1920 with the purpose of providing an education and activity group for those who enjoyed hiking, ski touring, river running and mountain climbing. However, it was informally organized earlier, sometime in August 1913. There were seven original participants who were met in the mountains, or on various trails near Salt Lake City. Originally there were thirteen charter members of the club, but within five years they grew past 500.

Starting in the 1920s, the Club played a key role in the growth of skiing in Utah, including organizing the first "ski train" in 1924.

In the 1950s, the club began to include such activities as river running and ski mountaineering. In the 1960s the club became increasingly concerned with wilderness conservation. Since then the club members have made extensive studies and participated in lobbying efforts aimed at preserving the Wasatch and Uintah Ranges and many areas of Southern Utah and neighboring states. These efforts have been gratified by the designation of the Lone Peak Wilderness Area in the 1970s and eight other wilderness areas in Utah in 1984.

The club's official history "Onward and Upward" by Michael Treshow and Jean Frances, published in 1995 highlights the events and personalities during the club's first 75 years.

== Current activity and support programs ==
The Wasatch Mountain Club is centered around non-competitive, muscle-powered outdoor sports. This includes hiking and backpacking, road and mountain biking, climbing, mountaineering, river running (raft, kayak, and canoe), ski touring and snowshoeing. The majority of the membership lives near Salt Lake City and most weeknight and weekend activities take place in the nearby Wasatch Mountains. The club has an active conservation program the focuses on the foothills and canyons to the east of Salt Lake City and partners with other organizations, such as the Utah Wilderness Coalition, to address statewide issues.

Starting in 1929, club members built a log cabin lodge, the Wasatch Mountain Club Lodge, located in Brighton, Utah, that is now on the National Register of Historic Places. The historic designation recognizes the building as one of few structures surviving from the earliest years of skiing in Utah. The lodge was used for club events and public rentals. In December 2010 the Wasatch Mountain Club transferred the building to a non-profit foundation that will manage the building for the public as an historic site with access through open houses, scheduled use for educational and cultural events, and private reservations for a cost-based fee. In October 2023, ownership of the lodge was transferred to Brighton Ski Resorts, who has committed to provide the lodge with much needed upgrades to preserve the integrity of the structure as well as to conduct the work necessary to support the lodge's place on the National Register of Historic Places. The Wasatch Mountain Club continues to utilize the lodge a few times a year for special events.
