= Prussia and the American Civil War =

Preoccupied with trying to unify the various German states under its banner, Prussia did not participate in the American Civil War. However, several members of the Prussian military served as officers and enlisted men in both armies, just as numerous men who previously immigrated to the United States. Also, official military observers were sent to North America to observe the tactics of both armies, which were later studied by future military leaders of Prussia and then the unified Germany.

Among the effects that Prussia had on the war was the new saddle used by the Union cavalry: Union General George McClellan had studied Prussian saddles and used them as a basis for his McClellan saddle.

== Individuals ==
Six generals who fought for the Union were Prussian-born. The highest-ranking was Maj. Gen. Peter J. Osterhaus, a corps commander who served under William Tecumseh Sherman in the March to the Sea. Carl Schurz was a famous political appointment who later became Secretary of the Interior. Karl Leopold Matthies was involved in charging Missionary Ridge in Chattanooga, Tennessee, only to be wounded. Alexander Schimmelfennig avoided capture for two days at the Battle of Gettysburg by hiding in a pigsty. August Willich was captured at the Battle of Stones River, and was wounded at the Battle of Resaca. The other was Frederick Salomon, brother of the wartime governor of Wisconsin Edward Salomon.

In the Confederacy, the most famous Prussian was Heros von Borcke, an officer serving on the staff of cavalry commander Jeb Stuart. The highest-ranking Prussian immigrant in the Confederate States Army was Adolphus Heiman, a veteran of the Mexican–American War who became a colonel and probably a brigadier general before he died in 1862. Baron Robert von Massow, the son of the King of Prussia's chamberlain, served under John S. Mosby in the 43rd Virginia Cavalry Battalion, known as Mosby's Rangers. Massow would later serve as commander of the German IX Corps just prior to World War I. Justus Scheibert was a Prussian military observer who for seven months followed Robert E. Lee's actions at several battles, including the Battle of Chancellorsville and the Battle of Gettysburg in 1863. Upon returning to Prussia in 1864, Scheibert wrote down his observations and placed them in several of Prussia's best libraries. From there what Scheibert learned helped Prussia and later unified Germany in five different wars.

== Official action ==
Most of the small German states were too interested in the current events of Europe to concern themselves with the American war, but they tended to sympathize with the Union's attempt to defeat the Confederacy. As major powers, Prussia and its rival German state, the Austrian Empire, were more interested, but on the whole, they were still less involved in the war than the United Kingdom and France were. In regard to Sherman's actions in Georgia, Prussian General Helmuth von Moltke said that "an armed mob" had nothing of value to be learned from. In response, Sherman compared Moltke to an "ass". There is some evidence that the story is apocryphal since Sherman, appearing before the Mixed Commission of American and British Claims (1871), was quoted as saying, "Moltke was never fool enough to say that. I have seen Moltke in person; I did not presume to ask him the question because I did not presume he was such an ass to say that. The Prussian army learned many a lesson and profited from them by our war and their officers were prompt to acknowledge it."

In 1862, British Foreign Secretary Lord John Russell tried unsuccessfully to have Prussia take part along with France and Russia to seek an armistice to end the war.
