= Mount Olivet Cemetery (Salt Lake City) =

Cemetery in Salt Lake City, Utah, United States

- The cemetery entrance on 500 S
- Interactive map of Mount Olivet Cemetery

Details
- Established: May 16, 1874
- Location: Salt Lake City, UT
- Country: United States
- Coordinates: 40°45′22″N 111°51′00″W
- Type: Public, non-profit
- Owned by: Mount Olivet Cemetery Association
- Size: 80 ac
- No. of interments: >33,000
- Website: Official website
- Find a Grave: Mount Olivet Cemetery

Mount Olivet Cemetery is a cemetery in Salt Lake City, Utah, United States. It was established on May 16, 1874, by an act of the U.S. Congress which granted 20 acres of land for public use as a cemetery. The first use of the cemetery was in 1877. The cemetery land originally consisted of exactly 20 acres and was part of the U.S. Army's Camp Douglas military reservation. Since that time, the allotment has been expanded and contracted; the present cemetery is approximately 80 acres.

== Notable burials ==
- Clarence Emir Allen (1852–1932), US Representative
- Clarence Bamberger (1886–1984), mining executive, member of the Utah House of Representatives and philanthropist
- Jacob B. Blair (1821–1901), US Representative
- Arthur M. Brown (1843–1906), US Senator
- Ina Claire (1893–1985), actress
- George Dern (1872–1936), Governor of Utah
- Robert V. Derrah (1895–1946), architect
- William S. Godbe (1833–1903), journalist
- Elmer O. Leatherwood (1872–1929), US Representative
- J. Bracken Lee (1899–1996), Utah Governor
- James B. McKean (1821–1879), US Representative
- Charles C. Moore (1866–1958), Governor of Idaho
- Charles Eberhard Salomon (1824–1881), Civil War Union Brevet Brigadier General
- Frederick Salomon (1826–1897), Civil War Union Brigadier General
- John Smith (1931–1995), actor (cenotaph to Robert Errol Van Orden)
- Jabez G. Sutherland (1825–1902), US Representative
- Amanda Swenson (1852-1919), soprano singer and instructor
- Arthur Lloyd Thomas (1851–1924), Utah Territorial Governor
- John Witcher (1839–1906), Civil War Union Brevet Brigadier General
