= Amanda Swenson =

Swedish singer (1852–1919)

Madame Amanda Swenson
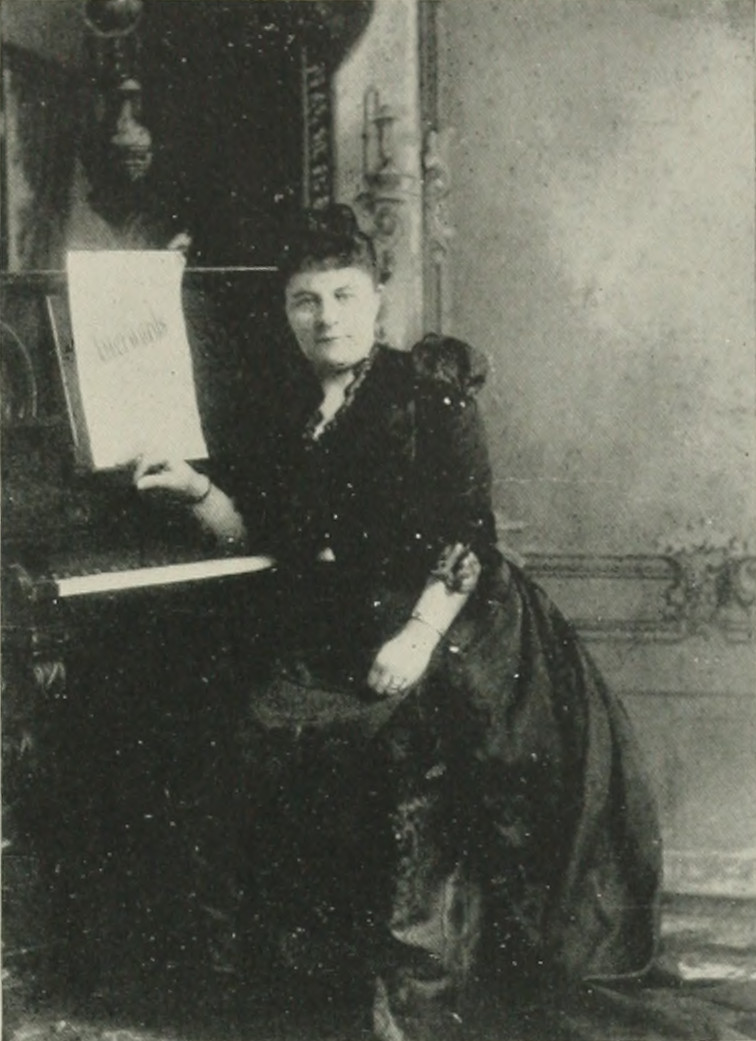
- A Woman of the Century

Background information
- Born: Amanda Carlsson; 1852; Nyköping, near Stockholm, Sweden
- Died: January 11, 1919 (aged 66–67) Salt Lake City, Utah, U.S.
- Occupations: Singer; teacher
- Instrument: Voice
- Formerly of: Swedish Ladies' Quartette
- Spouse: Anders Swenson

Amanda Swenson (1852 – January 11, 1919) was a Swedish-born American soprano singer and teacher. A member of the Swedish Ladies' Quartette as a young woman, she was a voice teacher in Salt Lake City, Utah, U.S. where her Ladies' Chorus won the Eisteddfods.

== Biography ==
Amanda Carlsson was born in Nyköping, near Stockholm, Sweden, in 1852. Her parents were Anders Carlsson and Margreta Larsdotter Carlsson.

When fourteen years old, her possession of a rare voice was discovered by her friends. Her mother was a widow in moderate circumstances, with seven children to support, and there was little hope of her receiving a musical education.

When she was sixteen, Rev. Mr. Ahlberger, of her native town, determined that she should have a musical education. He secured the cooperation of some wealthy residents of the vicinity, and she was sent to the Royal College of Music, Stockholm, where in three years, she graduated with honors, winning two silver medals. While there, she sang before the king and queen of Sweden. On one occasion, Swenson sang with the crown prince, now King Oscar II, president of the conservatory. She was a pupil of Manuel García.

== Career ==
=== Sweden ===
A few years after graduation, at the suggestion of her former teacher, Prof. Julius Günther, she accepted the position of first soprano in the Swedish Ladies' Quartette, then arranging for its tour. On the eve of departure, a farewell concert and banquet, given in her honor, showed the esteem in which she was held by her native town. Giving their first concert with great success in Stockholm, the quartette started on their tour June 7, 1875. Their route lay through Norway, Nortland, and Finland, then to Saint Petersburg, where they remained three months, giving public and private concerts and meeting many European celebrities. They spent two months in Moscow, receiving cordial welcome and entertainment. They visited Germany, Bohemia, Holland, and Belgium, spending the summer on the Rhine. At Ems, they met some Americans, who persuaded them to visit the U.S.

Soon after their arrival, Max Strakosch engaged them for a concert in New York City. From that time, their success in the U.S. was assured. They sang with Theodore Thomas in all the large eastern cities, and in several concerts with Ole Bull in the New England states. Afterward, they made a tour of the U.S., receiving welcomes in all the cities. Giving their last concert in San Francisco, California, they returned to Chicago, Illinois, where they separated.

=== United States ===
Carlson was persuaded to remain in the U.S., and she spent the next two years in Reading, Pennsylvania, where she held the position of first soprano in the Christ Episcopal Church.

On September 18, 1880, in Kearney, Nebraska, she married Anders (né Svensson) Swenson. After five years, she was widowed with two daughters, Carrie (b. 1884) and Olga (b. 1885). She did much to raise the standard of musical culture in that city which was her home for more than a decade.

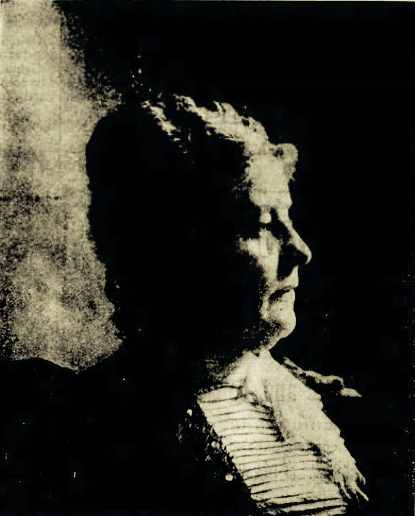
Swensen in 1898

She came to Salt Lake City, Utah, and soon became a prominent factor in the musical life of the city and state. At the request of Professor Evan Stephens, she took charge of the Ladies' Chorus. In September 1896, under Swenson's charge, the Salt Lake Ladies' Chorus, made up of a group of 40 women members from the Tabernacle Choir, carried off the grand prize at the Eisteddfod in Denver, Colorado.

At the first Eisteddfod held in Salt Lake, the chorus was awarded first prize, and at the second and third Eisteddfods held in Salt Lake, her singers each carried off the highest honors.

Swenson gave most of her time to private instructions in voice building and vocal culture. Her method aimed at a freedom of throat muscles and a decided naturalness in singing. As a teacher, Swenson was noted for her inspiring personality, as well as her diligence and enthusiasm in her work. As years passed and her health became poor, she declined to quit, and during the last few years of her life, was sustained more by will power than actual physical strength.

== Death ==
Amanda Carlson Swenson died at Salt Lake City, January 11, 1919, after an illness extending over a period of several months. Interment was in Mount Olivet cemetery.
