= Alta Club =

Coordinates: 40°46′09″N 111°53′16″W

- Alta Club logo
- Formation: 3 March 1883
- Location: Salt Lake City, Utah
- Website: altaclub.org

The Alta Club is a private club in downtown Salt Lake City, Utah, named for a local mining district. It was founded in 1883, 13 years before Utah's accession as a state. The Alta Club serves as a forum for business development and social interaction, and offers facilities for dining, social events, business meetings, and health and wellness.

The Clubhouse is located at 100 East South Temple.

The Alta Club has EIN 87-0110050 under the status 501(c)(7) Social and Recreation Clubs; in 2024 it reported $1,485,858 in total revenue and $1,959,535 in total assets. The Alta Club Building Foundation has EIN 87-0654211 as a 501(c)(3) Public Charity and is organized for "the preservation of the façade of an historic building located at 100 East South Temple." In 2024 it reported $30,681 in total revenue and $113,321 in total assets. The Alta Club Arts Foundation has EIN 20-4135880 as a 501(c)(3) Public Charity; in 2020 it reported total revenue of $4,550 and total assets of $24,799.

== History ==
By the late 1800s the territory known as Utah had a burgeoning economy. As a result, several affluent groups formed out of the mining and smelting industry. One such group took it upon themselves to create a gentlemen's social club modeled after the prestigious Union Club of San Francisco. A proposal outlining the club's formation was mailed to prospective members.

Following recruitment the Alta Club was founded in 1883 by eighty-one charter members, thirteen years before Utah became a state. The club was organized as a social club "to present the comforts and luxuries of a home together with the attraction to its members of meeting each other in a pleasant and social way."

=== Foundation ===
Although it is widely believed that the founding members only allowed “Gentiles” or those who were not of the Mormon faith to join, that soon changed. Not long after the club's formation, their resistance to those of the Mormon faith shifted. The first Mormon member was William Jennings, a former mayor of Salt Lake City, joining in 1885.

The years of Prohibition brought new challenges to the club. Simon Bamberger, who joined the club in 1904, was one of the Eighteenth Amendment's strongest proponents. However, not everyone in the club shared his vision for a dry state. In the years since its repeal, rumors and stories surfaced telling of the various ways members got their hands on “hooch” and brought it into the club.

On March 3, 1883, 81 charter members formally signed the Alta Club Articles of Incorporation. An opening ceremony was held in Liberty Park. In addition to the 81 charter members, in attendance was Wilford Woodruff, a later president of the LDS Church, and Utah territorial Governor Eli H. Murray. The club took up its first residence in the Alta Block, located at 21 West 200 South. In 1892, the Alta Club moved to the top floor of the newly constructed Dooly Block at 109 West 200 South, which was designed by architect Louis Sullivan of Chicago (Adler and Sullivan).

=== New clubhouse ===
The Alta Club clubhouse in 1900

Founded in 1883, the club was originally located in the old Alta Block, midway between Main Street and West Temple on Second South. In 1892, the Club moved to occupy the two top floors of the newly built Dooley Building. The Club remained at this location until June 1898.

Construction of a new clubhouse began in 1897 and was completed in less than a year by builder George Cushing. On June 1, 1898, the new building formally opened. The site selected for the current clubhouse was purchased for $15,000 from Harriet Hooper Young, wife of Willard Young, who was the son of LDS President Brigham Young. The Alta Club building was designed by Frederick Albert Hale in Italian Renaissance style.

In 1910 the East wing was added, almost doubling the size of the original clubhouse. For reasons unknown the original stone could not be matched; old and new stone from a different quarry were mixed in the addition. At that time a new entrance was built on South Temple Street. A stairway was added to the older State Street entrance to provide direct access to the second floor. This became known as the ladies' entrance, as women were restricted to the upper floors.

In 1958 the club acquired land located on the north side of South Temple Street for a parking lot. In 1993 the addition of a fitness center was completed with the goal of attracting new members. In 2001 a $4 million renovation project was completed. A major area of renovation was the third floor, which had not been used since the 1950s due to a fire.

Ongoing renovations, along with ongoing efforts from membership and staff, maintain what has become one of Salt Lake's most historic buildings.

=== Great Depression ===
The Great Depression was a difficult time for everyone, including the “rich man’s club.” At one point in 1933, the financial situation became so desperate that the Board decided to entirely waive initiation fees for 90 days, in hopes of encouraging people to join and pay monthly dues. In 1936 the Directors authorized the purchase of two slot machines. This controversial idea helped restore the club to fiscal health.

=== Present day ===
In 1987 the Alta Club welcomed its first non-widow women members. Deedee Corradini, then a Chamber of Commerce executive and later mayor of Salt Lake City; Genevieve Atwood, Utah State Geologist; and Annette P. Cumming, a prominent local philanthropist, became the first female members. In 2008, the Alta Club elected Ceri Jones as their first female president.

== Activities ==
The Alta Club offers a formal dining room, meeting and social rooms, a bar, a grill, card room, billiards, a member library, 20 guest rooms, a salon, and fitness center.

Special annual events include: New Year's Reception, Sweethearts Dinner, St. Patrick's Day Celebration, Mother's, Father's, and Easter Celebrations, Thanksgiving and Christmas Eve Dinner, and much more.

== Notable members ==
- Clarence Bamberger (1886–1984), mining executive, philanthropist and member of the Utah House of Representatives
- Theodore Bruback (1851–1904), mining and railroad businessman
- Deedee Corradini (1944–2015), mayor of Salt Lake City
- Walter E. Cosgriff (1914–1961), banker
- Jan Graham, attorney general of Utah
- Frederick Albert Hale (1855–1934), architect
- Tasker Oddie (1870–1950), attorney, governor of Nevada and U.S. senator
- Oscar J. Smith (1859–1937), lawyer and member of the New York State Assembly
- William H. Wattis (1859–1931), founder of the Utah Construction Company

== See also ==
- List of American gentlemen's clubs
