= Frederick Salomon =

Union Army general in the American Civil War

Frederick Charles Salomon
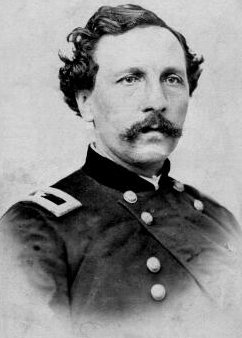
- Brig. Gen. Frederick Charles Salomon, c. 1860s
- Born: April 7, 1826; Ströbeck, Province of Saxony, Kingdom of Prussia
- Died: March 8, 1897 (aged 70); Salt Lake City, Utah, U.S.
- Burial place: Mount Olivet Cemetery, Salt Lake City, Utah, U.S.
- Relatives: Charles Eberhard Salomon (brother); Edward Salomon (brother); Edward S. Salomon (cousin)
- Military career
- Allegiance: Kingdom of Prussia; United States
- Branch: Prussian Army; United States Army Union Army
- Service years: 1861–1865 (USA)
- Rank: Lieutenant (Prussian Army); Brigadier General, USV; Brevet Major General, USV
- Commands: 9th Reg. Wis. Vol. Infantry
- Conflicts: American Civil War; Battle of Wilson's Creek; First Battle of Newtonia; Battle of Helena; Battle of Elkin's Ferry; Battle of Jenkins' Ferry

Frederick (Friedrich) Charles Salomon (April 7, 1826 – March 8, 1897) was a German immigrant to the United States who served as a Union Army officer and general during the American Civil War. He was an elder brother of the Civil War-era Wisconsin Governor Edward Salomon.

== Biography ==
Frederick Salomon was born to a Jewish family in Ströbeck near Halberstadt, Prussia. After attending a gymnasium, he became a government surveyor, later a lieutenant of artillery, and in 1848 a pupil in the Berlin School of Architecture. Soon afterward, he emigrated to the United States, where he settled in Manitowoc, Wisconsin, as a surveyor. For four years, he was county register of deeds, and 1857-1859 he was the chief engineer with the Manitowoc and Wisconsin Railroad.

In 1861 he joined the Missouri 5th Infantry as captain under Gen. Franz Sigel and was present at Wilson's Creek. After three months of service, he was appointed colonel of the 9th Wisconsin Volunteer Infantry Regiment, and joined the "Indian Expedition" into Indian Territory (present day Oklahoma). He forcibly removed and arrested the commander of the expedition, Col. William Weer, due to drunkenness.

Salomon was appointed a brigadier general of volunteers on July 18, 1862, to rank from July 16, 1862, which was the date of confirmation of his appointment by the United States Senate. On September 30, 1862, he made an unsuccessful attempt to capture Newtonia, Missouri, during the First Battle of Newtonia. He commanded a division under Benjamin M. Prentiss of the victorious Union troops at the Battle of Helena, Arkansas. He was mustered out of service on August 24, 1865. On January 13, 1866 President Andrew Johnson nominated Salomon for appointment to the grade of brevet major general of volunteers to rank from March 13, 1865, and the United States Senate confirmed the appointment on March 12, 1866.

For several years, he was surveyor general of Utah Territory, where he died in Salt Lake City on March 8, 1897, and was buried in Mount Olivet Cemetery there. His grave can be found in Section E, Lot 7, Grave 7.

He was the brother of Edward Salomon, a Civil War-era governor of Wisconsin. Salomon was also the brother of Charles Eberhard Salomon, who became a brevet brigadier general in the Union Army.

== See also ==
- List of American Civil War generals (Union)
- Prussia in the American Civil War
- German Americans in the Civil War

== Notes ==
- Eicher, John H.; Eicher, David J. (June 2002), Civil War High Commands, Stanford, CA: Stanford University Press (published 2001), ISBN 978-0-8047-3641-1
