= Clarence Bamberger =

American mining executive and politician (1886–1984)

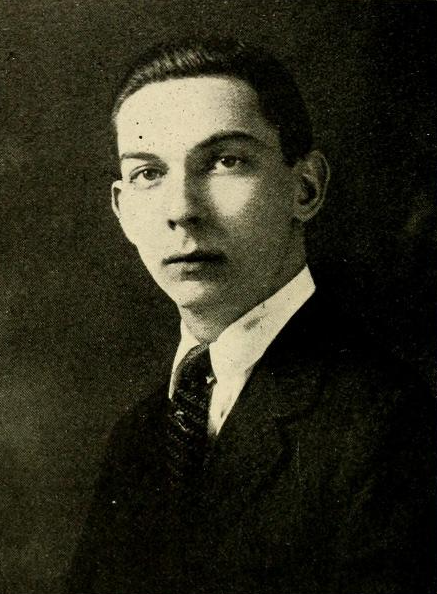
- Bamberger in a 1914 publication

Member of the Utah House of Representatives
- In office 1913–1913

Personal details
- Born: Clarence G. Bamberger; July 16, 1886 Salt Lake City, Utah, U.S.
- Died: February 18, 1984 (aged 97)
- Resting place: Mount Olivet Cemetery
- Party: Republican
- Spouse: Marie Odell (m. 1915; died 1971)
- Children: 3
- Education: Royal School of Mines; Paris School of Mines
- Alma mater: Cornell University
- Occupation: Mining executive; politician; philanthropist

Clarence G. Bamberger (July 16, 1886 – February 18, 1984) was an American mining executive, politician and philanthropist. He served as a member of the Utah House of Representatives in 1913. He was a member of the War Industries Board during World War I.

== Early life ==
Clarence G. Bamberger was born on July 16, 1886, in Salt Lake City, Utah, to Bertha (née Greenewald) and Jacob E. Bamberger. He was educated at public schools in Salt Lake City and Phillips Exeter Academy in New Hampshire. He graduated with a degree in mining engineering from Cornell University in 1908. He attended the Royal School of Mines in Berlin for a year and the Paris School of Mines for two years.

== Career ==
After his education, Bamberger took surveys of oil fields in Mexico that his father was associated with. He was a Republican. He served as a member of the Utah House of Representatives in 1913. He introduced the first workmen's compensation bill in Utah. He was a leader in Utah's movement to repeal prohibition and was state commander of the Utah Association Opposed to Prohibition. In 1914, he ran for the Utah State Senate, but lost to George Dern.

During World War I, Bamberger was captain of the ordinance department and worked with the War Industries Board. He was executive director of all war loan drives in Utah during World War II. He was executive vice chairman of the War Finance Committee of Utah from 1942 to 1946. He was chairman of Utah Citizens for Eisenhower in 1952.

Bamberger worked with his father and brother Ernest in financing and developing mining properties in Utah, Nevada and Colorado, and oil fields in Mexico and California. He helped operate the Smuggler Mine in Aspen, Colorado, Daly & Daly West Mines and the Ontario silver mine in Park City, Utah, and the Weber Coal Mine in Coalville, Utah.

== Philanthropy ==
Bamberger was a director and member of the Walker Bank & Trust (later First Interstate) executive committee. He was an organizer and director of the Bank of Utah and organizer of the Bank of Kearns. Through a friendship with Basil O'Connor, he served as national director of the National Foundation for Infantile Paralysis from its founding to his death. He helped reorganize and was national director of the American Red Cross in the mid-1930s. He served on the national board of Alcoholics Anonymous and was chairman of the Utah State Hospital. He was member of the board Holy Cross Hospital in Salt Lake City, chairman of the Utah National Fund for Medical Education, vice chairman of the University of Utah Medical Center, and member of the National Founders' Board of the Salk Institute for Biological Studies.

Bamberger was regent of the University of Utah and a board member of Westminster College. He was a member of the board of the Hoover Library in Palo Alto, California, and a member of the Cornell University Council.

== Personal life ==
Bamberger married Marie Odell, daughter of George T. Odell, on February 14, 1915. She died in 1971. They had two daughters and one son, Marie, Gloria and Clarence Jr. He purchased a home on East South Temple Street in Salt Lake City in 1919. He was a member of Alta Club from 1911 to his death.

Bamberger died on February 18, 1984. He was buried at Mount Olivet Cemetery.
