= List of U.S. cities by adjusted per capita personal income (2019) =

List of U.S. cities by adjusted per capita personal income estimates the per capita personal income (PCPI) of residents of United States' Metropolitan statistical areas (MSA). A MSA is defined as a central city or cities and their surrounding area of influence. The PCPI is adjusted by differences in the cost of living, called "regional price parities" by the Bureau of Economic Analysis. The effect of adjusting the per capita personal income by the cost of living is to narrow the difference in the standard of living between most high-income cities and most low-income cities.

The BEA defines regional price parities as an estimate of "the differences in price levels across states and metropolitan areas for a given year and are expressed as a percentage of the overall national price level." The BEA defines personal income as follows:

Personal income is the income received by, or on behalf of, all persons from all sources: from participation as laborers in production, from owning a home or business, from the ownership of financial assets, and from government and business in the form of transfers. It includes income from domestic sources as well as the rest of world. It does not include realized or unrealized capital gains or losses. Personal income is estimated before the deduction of personal income taxes and other personal taxes and is reported in current dollars (no adjustment is made for price changes).

Per Capita Personal Income (PCPI) is a more inclusive estimate of the average standard of living of residents in the U.S. than measures of per capita income. PCPI "includes wages, benefits, proprietor income, dividends, interest, rent, and transfer payments" such as Social Security, veteran's benefits, farm subsidies, welfare, and food stamps.

The difference in estimates of per capita income and per capita personal income is large. In 2019, the U.S. Census Bureau calculated a per capita income of the United States as 34,103 dollars. The U.S. Bureau of Economic Analysis calculated the PCPI as 56,490 dollars.

A more valid accounting of the differences in the standard of living of residents in different citizens requires recognition that prices vary from state to state and city to city. In general, a dollar has more purchasing power in the poorer cities than it does in the richer cities. The difference in housing costs from city to city is especially important. The Bureau of Economic Analysis has calculated that the regional price parity in 2019 of the 50 largest MSAs ranges from 88.3 in Birmingham, Alabama (which has the lowest cost of living of the 50 most populous MSAs) to 126.7 in San Jose, California (the highest cost of living of the 50 most populous MSAs). An income of $0.88 in Birmingham equals an income of $1.27 in San Jose with the U.S as a whole having an average PCPI of $1.00. To put it another way, the purchasing power of a dollar compared to the U.S. average is $1.13 in Birmingham and $0.79 in San Jose. The net impact of accounting for differences in the purchasing power of a dollar in different MSAs is to narrow the gap in the standard of living between rich and poor cities.

The statistical analysis is complicated by the various definitions of what constitutes a "city." There are three commonly used definitions:

- the population within the legal limits of an incorporated city;
- an MSA which includes not only the population within the legal boundaries of a city but also the population of the jurisdictions in its suburbs and in the surrounding counties which are influenced by the central city;
- a Combined Statistical Area which combines the population of two or more MSAs.

The population and per capita personal income estimates of metropolitan statistical areas are used in the following table.

== Standard Metropolitan statistical areas by PCPI, adjusted by regional price parity ==
50 largest metropolitan areas	Per Capita Personal Income (PCPI) (2019)	Rank in PCPI before adjustment	Purchasing power of $1.00 (2019)	PCPI after adjustments for purchasing power of dollar	Rank in PCPI after adjustment
1. New York City-Newark-Jersey City, NY-NJ-PA MSA	$79,844	4	$0.80	$63,875	7
2. Los Angeles-Long Beach-Anaheim, CA MSA	$66,684	8	$0.84	$56,015	34
3. Chicago-Naperville-Elgin, IL-IN-WI MSA	$63,500	14	$0.97	$61,595	18
4. Dallas-Fort Worth-Arlington, TX MSA	$58,725	22	$0.99	$58,138	27
5. Houston-The Woodlands-Sugar Land, TX MSA	$58,890	20	$0.98	$57,712	28
6. Washington-Arlington-Alexandria, DC-VA-MD-WV MSA	$74,385	6	$0.85	$63,227	9
7. Miami-Fort Lauderdale-West Palm Beach, FL MSA	$60,966	16	$0.90	$54,869	39
8. Philadelphia-Camden-Wilmington, PA-NJ-DE-MD MSA	$66,596	9	$0.95	$63,226	10
9. Atlanta-Sandy Springs-Alpharetta, GA MSA	$54,557	32	$1.02	$55,648	36
10. Phoenix-Mesa-Chandler, AZ MSA	$48,065	47	$1.01	$48,546	48
11. Boston-Worcester-Providence, MA-RI-NH-CT CSA	$81,498	3	$0.87	$70,903	3
12. San Francisco-Oakland-Berkeley, CA MSA	$104,291	2	$0.74	$77,175	2
13. Riverside-San Bernardino-Ontario, CA MSA	$42,242	50	$0.93	$39,285	50
14. Detroit–Warren–Dearborn, MI MSA	$54,172	35	$1.04	$56,339	32
15. Seattle-Tacoma-Bellevue, WA MSA	$78,073	5	$0.87	$67,924	4
16. Minneapolis-St. Paul-Bloomington, MN-WI MSA	$64,225	11	$0.97	$62,298	13
17. San Diego-Chula Vista-Carlsbad, CA MSA	$63,726	13	$0.85	$54,167	41
18. Tampa-St. Petersburg-Clearwater, FL MSA	$48, 908	43	$1.01	$49,397	47
19 Denver-Aurora-Lakewood, CO MSA	$67,236	7	$0.96	$64,547	5
20. St. Louis, MO-IL MSA	$56,293	27	$1.11	$63,185	11
21. Baltimore-Columbia-Towson, MD MSA	$63,988	12	$0.95	$60,789	21
22. Charlotte-Concord-Gastonia, NC-SC MSA	$53,916	43	$1.06	$57,151	30
23. Orlando-Kissimmee-Sanford, FL MSA	$45,156	49	$1.01	$45,608	49
24. San Antonio-New Braunfels, TX MSA	$48,694	46	$1.07	$52,106	45
25. Portland-Vancouver-Hillsboro, OR-WA MSA	$59,921	19	$0.95	$56,925	31
26. Sacramento-Roseville-Folsom, CA MSA	$58,843	21	$0.95	$55,901	35
27. Pittsburgh-New Castle-Weirton, PA-OH-WV CSA	$60,227	18	$1.01	$60,829	20
28. Las Vegas-Henderson-Paradise, NV MSA	$48,806	45	$1.03	$50,270	46
29. Austin-Round Rock-Georgetown, TX MSA	$61,977	15	$1.01	$62,597	12
30. Cincinnati, OH-KY-IN MSA	$56,033	29	$1.10	$61,636	16
31. Kansas City, MO-KS MSA	$55,009	31	$1.08	$59,406	24
32. Columbus, OH MSA	$52,477	40	$1.09	$57,200	29
33. Indianapolis-Carmel-Anderson, IN MSA	$56,360	26	$1.10	$61,966	15
34. Cleveland-Elyria, OH MSA	$55,451	30	$1.11	$61, 551	17
35. San Jose-Sunnyvale-Santa Clara, CA MSA	$114,080	1	$0.79	$90,123	1
36. Nashville-Davidson–Murfreesboro–Franklin, TN MSA	$60,680	17	$1.06	$64,321	6
37. Virginia Beach-Norfolk-Newport News, VA-NC MSA	$52,011	37	$1.04	$54,091	42
38. Providence-Warwick, RI-MA MSA	$56,138	28	$1.00	$56,138	33
39. Milwaukee-Waukesha, WI MSA	$58,457	24	$1.06	$62,060	14
40. Jacksonville, FL MSA	$51,421	36	$1.05	$53,992	43
41. Oklahoma City, OK MSA	$48,860	44	$1.11	$54,235	40
42. Raleigh-Cary, NC MSA	$57,851	25	$1.04	$60,165	23
43. Memphis, TN-MS-AR MSA	$47,985	48	$1.12	$53,743	44
44. Richmond, VA MSA	$58,628	23	$1.04	$60,973	19
45. New Orleans-Metairie, LA MSA	$54,463	33	$1.07	$58,275	26
46. Louisville/Jefferson County, KY-IN MSA	$52,134	38	$1.12	$58,390	25
47. Salt Lake City, UT MSA	$54,450	34	$1.01	$54,995	38
48. Hartford-East Hartford-Middletown, CT MSA	$65,152	10	$0.98	$63,849	8
49. Buffalo-Niagara Falls, NY MSA	$52,331	39	$1.06	$55,471	37
50. Birmingham-Hoover, AL MSA	$53,374	41	$1.13	$60,313	22
United States	$56,490		$1.00	$56,490	
