= Ströbeck =

Schachdorf Ströbeck
- Stadtteil of Halberstadt
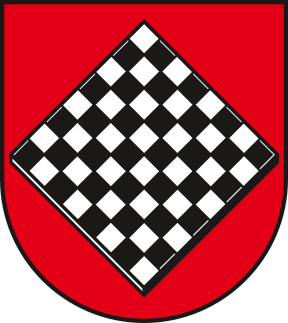
- Coat of arms
- Interactive map of Schachdorf Ströbeck
- Location within Germany Location within Saxony-Anhalt
- Coordinates: 51°55′N 10°57′E
- Country: Germany
- State: Saxony-Anhalt
- District: Harz
- Town: Halberstadt

Area
  - Total: 13.46 km^{2} (5.20 sq mi)
- Elevation: 156 m (512 ft)

Population (2006-12-31)
  - Total: 1,149
  - Density: 85.36/km^{2} (221.1/sq mi)
- Time zone: UTC+01:00 (CET)
  - Summer (DST): UTC+02:00 (CEST)
- Postal codes: 38822
- Dialling codes: 039427
- Vehicle registration: HZ

Schachdorf Ströbeck is a village in Saxony-Anhalt, Germany, which since 1 January 2010 is part of the town of Halberstadt in the Harz district, in Saxony-Anhalt, Germany. Located about 8 km (5.0 mi) west of the city centre, the Schachdorf ("chess village") is known for its long historic connection with chess.

== History ==
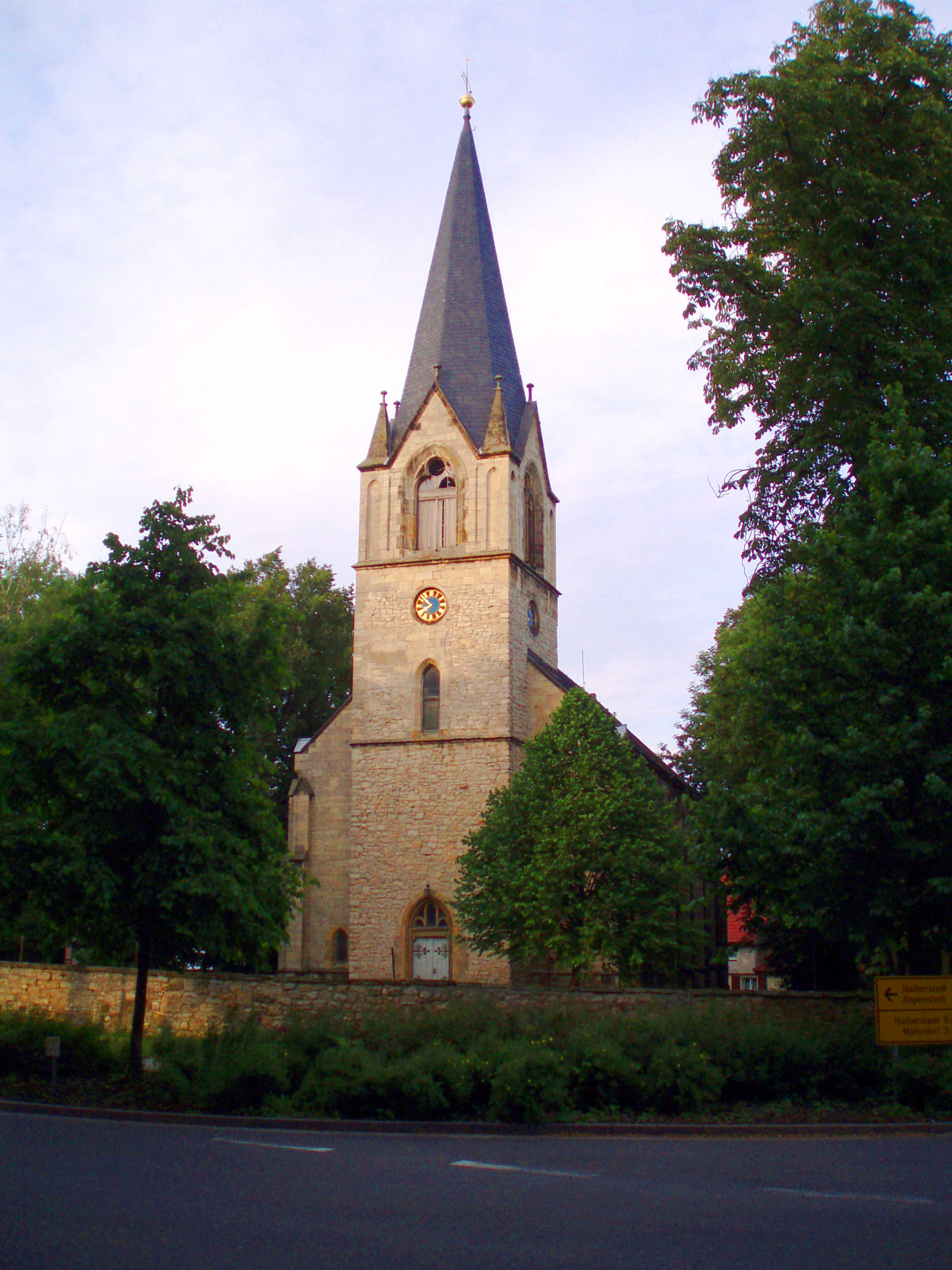
St Pancras' Church

The first mention of Strebechi dates back to 995, when King Otto III of Germany dedicated the estate in the Eastphalian Harzgau to his sister Abbess Adelaide of Quedlinburg. In 1004 his successor King Henry II granted it to Drübeck Abbey. Ströbeck was a fief of the Bishopric of Halberstadt, later held by the comital House of Regenstein, from 1343 by the Counts of Wernigerode.

=== Chess ===
The main activity for which the village is known, occurred possibly in 1011. According to legend, Bishop Arnulf of Halberstadt had imprisoned Gunzelin of Kuckenburg, the deposed Margrave of Meissen, in the Wartturm, a tower in Ströbeck, and ordered the local farmers to guard him. Due to the boredom in his prison, Gunzelin created a chess set and taught his guards the game.

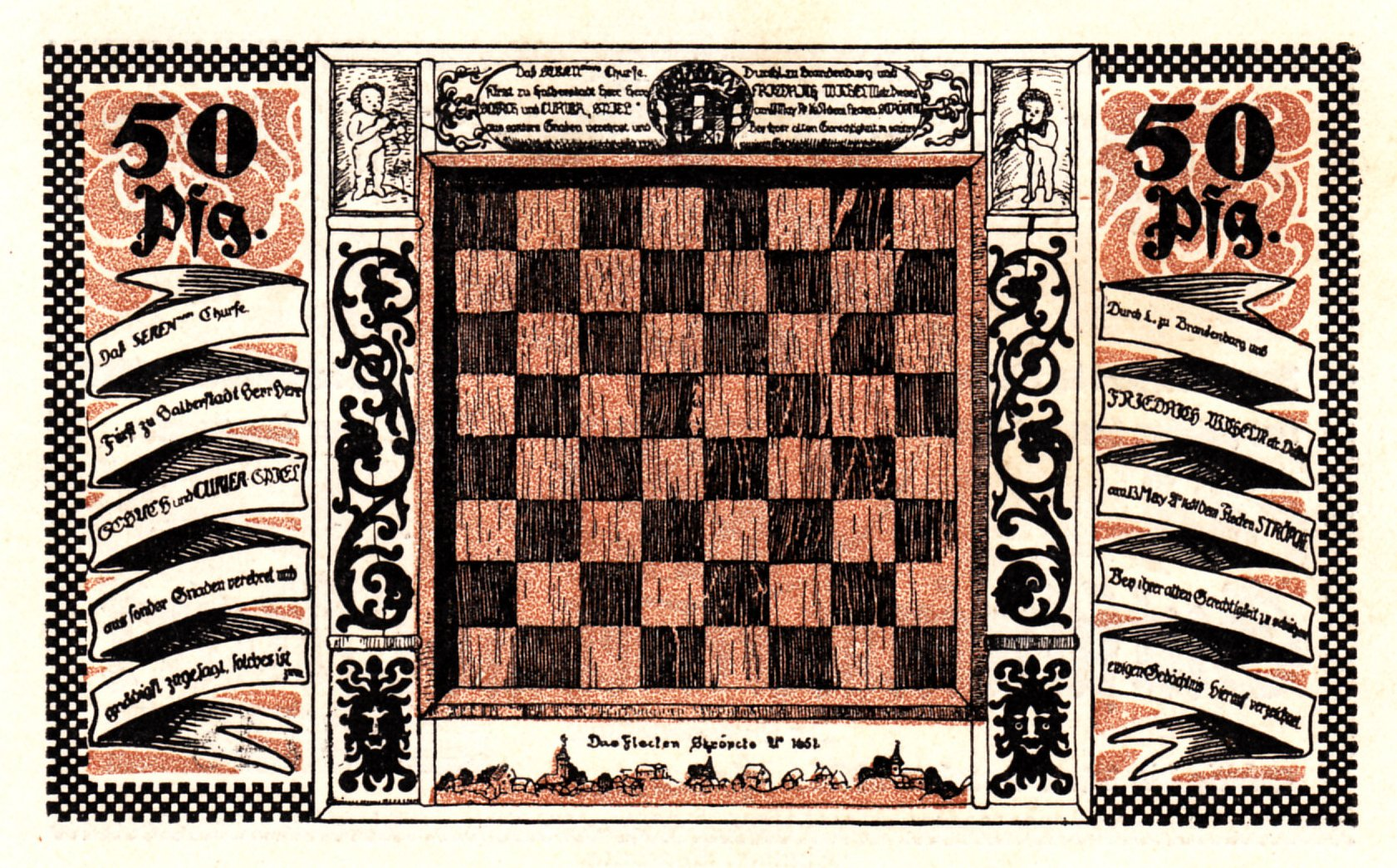
One of Ströbeck's notgeld currency notes featuring a chessboard, 1921

The game was first mentioned in a 1515 deed, when it had become a tradition among the local people, even though at that time chess was only played elsewhere by nobles and clerics. The Ströbeck tradition was described by Duke Augustus II of Brunswick-Wolfenbüttel alias Gustavus Selenus in his 1616 book Chess or the King's Game. Ströbeck is also mentioned in H. J. R. Murray's 1913 work A History of Chess.

In 1651, Frederick William, Elector of Brandenburg awarded a chess board to the townspeople for their proficiency in the game. It is preserved in a local museum.

Chess continued to be a strong part of Ströbeck's culture and when they village issued its own currency (Notgeld) during the First World War, it featured images of chessboards.

== Chess traditions ==
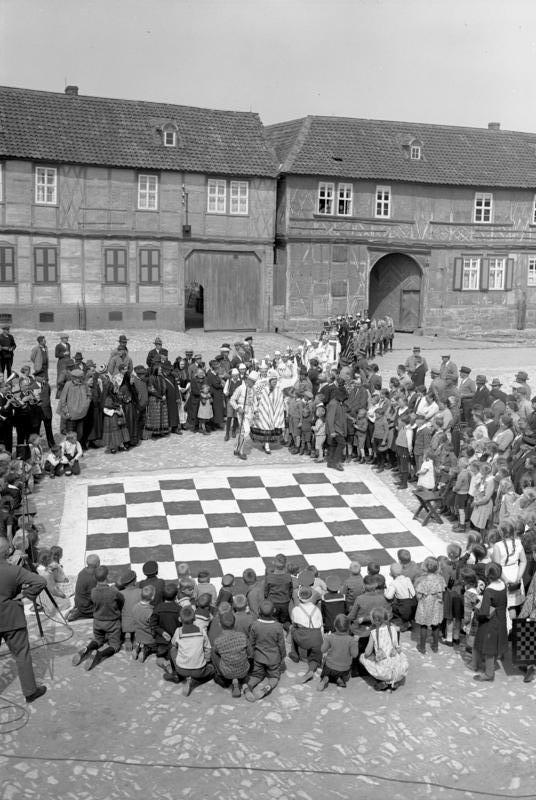
People in Ströbeck prepare to play a game of human chess, 1932

An international chess tournament is annually held. Since the late 17th century, famous chess matches are regularly illustrated by human chess performances with actors in the guise of pieces. The local elementary school, named after Emanuel Lasker, is the only public school in Germany which teaches chess as part of the curriculum, and it had done so since 1823; just as the Ströbeck secondary school, which was closed in 2004, due to too few pupils.

A local chess museum opened in 1991. Among the exhibits are an elaborate chess set, donated by the "Great Elector" Frederick William of Brandenburg in 1651, as well as several 12 x 8 boards for Courier Chess.

== Notable residents ==
- Edward Salomon (1827–1909), politician. governor of Wisconsin
- Frederick Salomon, general in the American Civil War
