= Brighton Ski Resort =

Ski resort near Salt Lake City, Utah, United States

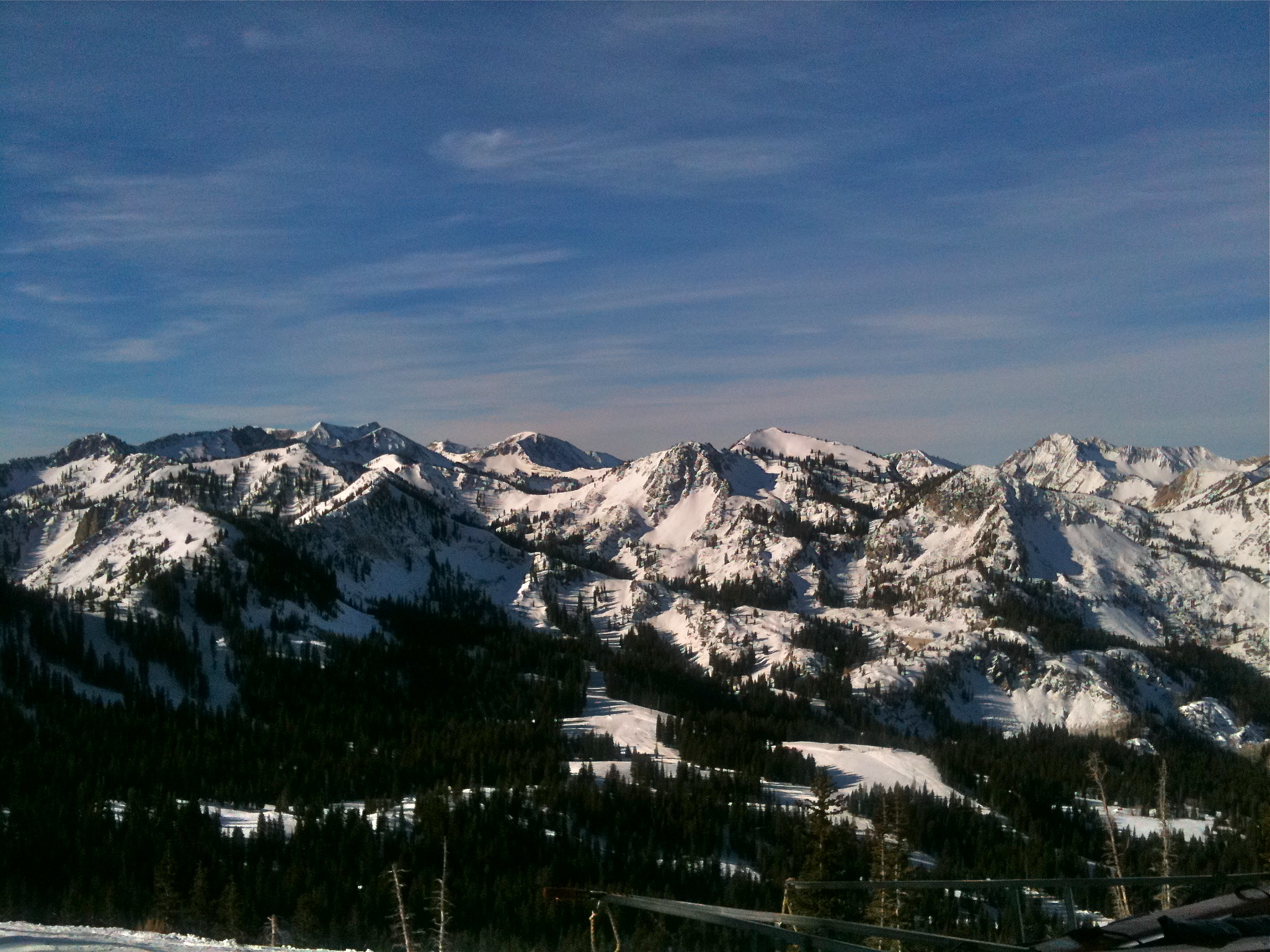
- View from the resort in 2012

- Location in the United States Location in Utah
- Location: Brighton, Utah, U.S.
- Nearest city: Salt Lake City
- Coordinates: 40°36′0″N 111°35′0″W
- Status: Operating
- Owner: Boyne Resorts
- Vertical: 1,750 feet (533 m)
- Top elevation: 10,750 feet (3,277 m)
- Base elevation: 8,755 feet (2,669 m)
- Skiable area: 1,050 acres (4.2 km^{2})
- Trails: 66 total 21% beginner 40% intermediate 39% expert/advanced
- Longest run: 1.2 miles (1.9 km)
- Lift system: 1 high-speed six pack 3 high-speed quads 1 fixed grip quad 1 triple
- Terrain parks: Yes, 5
- Snowfall: 700 inches (58.3 ft; 17.8 m)
- Website: brightonresort.com

Brighton Ski Resort is a ski area in the western United States, located in Big Cottonwood Canyon in Brighton, Utah. About thirty miles (50 km) from downtown Salt Lake City, it is owned and operated by Boyne Resorts.

== Description ==
Brighton Ski Resort was the first ski resort in Utah, and one of the first in the United States. Brighton was started in 1936 when members of the Alpine Ski Club built a rope tow from wire and an old elevator motor. The resort was named for Thomas W. Brighton, who is credited with constructing the first buildings in the area.

Boyne Resorts purchased the resort in 1986, sold Brighton to CNL Lifestyle in 2007, but continued to operate the property under a lease. CNL sold the property to Och-Ziff Capital Management in 2016, and Boyne repurchased it in May 2018.

Brighton was voted to have the 2nd best snow in North America, losing the top spot to Snowbird in adjacent Little Cottonwood Canyon.

Brighton is on public lands; all of the resort's land is part of the Wasatch-Cache National Forest, meaning the whole resort is open to the public year-round, though tickets must be purchased to use the lifts.

Brighton is adjacent to Solitude Mountain Resort, and the two ski areas offer a common "Solbright Pass" which provides access to both resorts for a nominal surcharge.

== Snowboarding Legacy ==
From the early 1990s through the 2000s, many top professional and amateur snowboarders called Brighton their home.

== Trivia ==
The Disney Channel Original Movies, Johnny Tsunami and Cloud 9, were filmed at Brighton Ski Resort.
