= Per capita personal income in the United States =

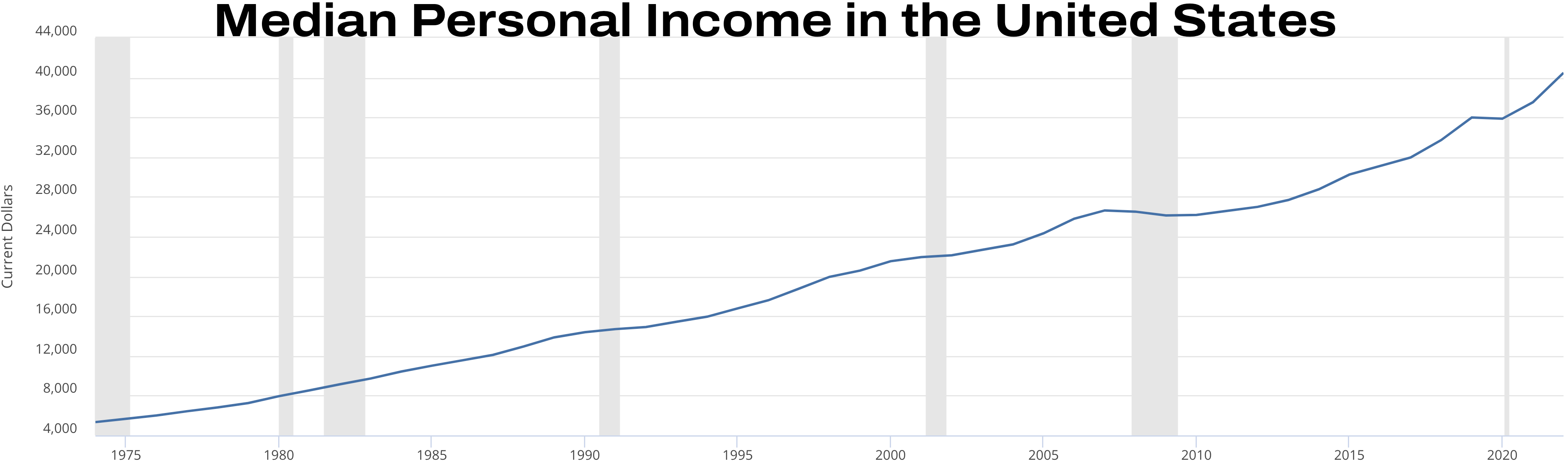
Median personal income in the United States

As per United States Census Bureau 2022 data, the median per capita income in the United States is $37,683, while median household income is around $69,021.

One of the most commonly used metrics for gauging the economic performance and shifting fortunes of local economies is per capita income (PCI). It is measured as the amount of wage and compensation disbursements, other labor income, proprietors' income with inventory valuation and capital consumption adjustments, persons' rental income with capital consumption adjustments, personal dividend income, personal interest income, and transfer payments to persons, less personal social insurance contributions. The Per Capita Personal Income of the United States defines the personal income of a specific area, earned by or on behalf of all of the persons who live in the area. As a result, personal income figures are presented by the income recipients' place of residence. This measure of income is calculated as the personal income of the residents of a given area divided by the resident population of the area. The Bureau of Economic Analysis (BEA) uses the United States Census Bureau's annual midyear population projections to calculate per capita personal income for states and counties. Except for college students and other seasonal populations, which are counted on April 1, the population for all other groups is counted on July 1.

On average, the United States' real per capita personal income grew at an annual rate of 2.27% over 1959–2020. The United States posted its highest growth in 1984 (5.53%) and posted its lowest growth in 2009 (−3.87%). In all states and the District of Columbia, an improvement in transfer receipts was the leading contributor to personal income growth in 2020. The percentage change in personal income in each state ranged from 8.4 percent in Arizona and Montana to 2.4 percent in Wyoming states. All of which increased the per capita personal income in 2020 by 6.1 percent, following a previous increase of 3.9 percent in 2019. The combined increase in personal income throughout the United States totaled $1.1 trillion.

== See also ==
- Household income in the United States
- Social class in the United States
- Poverty in the United States
- Affluence in the United States
- Personal income in the United States
- List of U.S. cities by adjusted per capita personal income
- List of U.S. states by adjusted per capita personal income
