= Solitude Mountain Resort =

Ski resort in Brighton, Utah, United States

- Solitude's lower terrain in 2006

- Location in Utah Solitude Mountain Resort (the United States)
- Location: Brighton, Utah, United States
- Nearest city: Salt Lake City, Utah
- Coordinates: 40°36′54.5″N 111°35′20.1″W
- Status: Operating
- Owner: Alterra Mountain Company
- Vertical: 2,494 ft (760 m)
- Top elevation: 10,488 ft (3,197 m)
- Base elevation: 7,988 ft (2,435 m)
- Skiable area: 1,200 acres (4.9 km^{2})
- Trails: 80
- Longest run: 3.5 miles (5.6 km); Honeycomb Trail
- Lift system: 8: 1 high speed six pack; 3 high speed quads; 2 fixed grip quads; 1 triple; -1 double
- Snowfall: 500 inches (1,300 cm)
- Snowmaking: Yes
- Night skiing: No
- Website: solitudemountain.com

Solitude Mountain Resort is a ski resort located in the Big Cottonwood Canyon of the Wasatch Mountains, thirty miles southeast of Salt Lake City, Utah. With 66 trails, 1,200 acres (4.9 km^{2}) and 2,047 feet (624 m) vertical, Solitude is one of the smaller ski resorts near Salt Lake City, along with its neighbor Brighton. It is a family-oriented mountain, with a wider range of beginner and intermediate slopes than other nearby ski resorts; 50% of its slopes are graded "beginner" or "intermediate," the highest such ratio in the Salt Lake City area. Solitude was one of the first major US resorts to adopt an RFID lift ticket system, allowing lift lines to move more efficiently. It was followed by Alta Ski Area in 2007. Solitude is adjacent to Brighton Ski Resort near the top of Big Cottonwood Canyon. Solitude and Brighton offer a common "Solbright Pass" which provides access to both resorts for a nominal surcharge.

== The Mountain ==
Most of Solitude's trails descend from a ridge (Eagle Ridge trail) which runs parallel with The Big Cottonwood Canyon Scenic Byway (SR-190) as it rises up the center of Big Cottonwood Canyon. Two lifts—quad chair Powder Horn II and the six-pack Eagle Express—run to the top of Eagle Ridge, while quads Apex Express and Moonbeam Express feed the intermediate and beginner terrain (respectively) immediately below it. The back of Eagle Ridge drops into Honeycomb Canyon, a long valley with most of the resort's bowl skiing. Honeycomb Canyon is primarily accessed by the Summit Express lift, which runs behind Eagle Ridge to the mountain's summit; return access from the bottom of Honeycomb Canyon is also available via the Honeycomb Return quad. The Summit Express lift also provides access to adjacent Brighton Ski Resort. Two more lifts, Link double and Sunrise triple, provide dedicated skiing areas for beginners.

== History ==
Solitude was first developed for skiing by Moab, Utah, uranium tycoon Robert M. Barrett. Barrett decided to start his own ski resort after being denied the use of the restrooms at Alta, which were reserved for Alta guests only. He started construction at Solitude in 1956, having bought all the land in Big Cottonwood Canyon, the next canyon over from Alta. The resort opened for business one year later, and passed through ownership changes until it was acquired by a business group led by Gary DeSeelhorst in 1977. DeSeelhorst became the resort's sole owner in 1986 and implemented an aggressive renovation project, including the 1989 construction of Utah's first express quad chairlift, Eagle Express. Accommodations upgrades in this period included the construction of the Creekside lodge in 1995.

On October 3, 2014, Deer Valley Resort announced that they had entered into an agreement to buy Solitude from the DeSeelhorst family and took over operation of the resort on May 1, 2015. During the summer of 2015 under the new leadership of Deer Valley Resort, Doppelmayr constructed a new high speed detachable quad to replace the existing Summit double chairlift, with a new alignment. The new Summit Express lift, combined with a new access trail from the top of the Apex Express lift, decreases the travel time to Honeycomb Canyon.

In August 2017, parent resort Deer Valley was acquired by Alterra Mountain Company. Solitude continued to be owned by the former Deer Valley ownership for one more season until it was announced on June 20, 2018 that Solitude had agreed to be sold to Alterra.

Solitude is the host for the snowboardcross and ski cross events for the FIS Freestyle Ski and Snowboarding World Championships 2019.

Solitude was the first resort in Utah to implement basic parking fees. Visitors were charged as much as $20 per day to park beginning November 23, 2019.

== Solitude Nordic Center ==
Solitude Resort also operates a Nordic center. The Solitude Nordic Center, nestled between the Solitude and Brighton ski areas, offers a variety of Nordic sport opportunities, including snowshoeing, skate and classic cross-country skiing. The site's 13 cross-country skiing trails cover twelve miles (almost 20 km) evenly divided between "easiest" and "moderately difficult", including a long loop of two miles (3 km). Six snowshoe trails cover six miles (ten kilometers). Instruction and training workshops are offered.

== Facts and figures ==
- Base elevation: 7,988 feet (2,435 m)
- Summit elevation: 10,035 feet (3,059 m)
- Vertical rise: 2,047 feet (624 m)
- Total skiable area: 1,200 acres (4.9 km^{2})
- Lifts: 8 chairlifts: (1 high speed six pack, 3 high speed quad, 2 fixed-grip quad, 1 triple, 1 double)
- Runs:
  - Beginner: 10% (Green Circle)
  - Intermediate: 40% (Blue Square-more difficult)
  - Advanced/Expert: 50% (Black Diamond-most difficult)

Named a Top 20 Family Ski Resort for two consecutive years, 2007-2008

== Chairlifts ==
Name	Year opened	Manufacturer	Lift Type	Length
Apex Express	2008	Doppelmayr	Detachable Quad	970m
Eagle Express	2023	Doppelmayr	Detachable Six-Pack	1443m
Honeycomb Return	2002	Doppelmayr	Fixed-Grip Quad	396m
Link	1988	CTEC	Fixed-Grip Double	380m
Moonbeam Express	2008	Doppelmayr	Detachable Quad	852m
Powderhorn II	2009	Doppelmayr	Fixed-Grip Quad	800m
Summit Express	2015	Doppelmayr	Detachable Quad	1554m
Sunrise	1977	Thiokol	Fixed-Grip Triple	869m
