= Skirmish at Terre Noire Creek =

1864 battle of the American Civil War

Coordinates: 34.047°N 93.190°W

- Part of the American Civil War
Date	April 2, 1864
Location	Clark County, Arkansas
Result	Union victory

Belligerents
United States	Confederate States

Commanders and leaders
(United States) Frederick Steele; Samuel Allen Rice	(Confederate States of America) Joseph O. Shelby; William Lewis Cabell

Units involved
1st Brigade, Third Division, Department of Arkansas, except 33rd Iowa Infantry	Shelby’s Cavalry Brigade; Detachment of Cabell's Cavalry Brigade

Casualties and losses
8 killed, 23 wounded, 32 missing	Unknown killed and wounded

The Skirmish at Terre Noire Creek, also known as the Skirmish at Wolf Creek or Skirmish at Antoine, an engagement during the Camden Expedition of the American Civil War, was fought on April 2, 1864. The action occurred about 1 mile (1.6 km) east of Terre Noire Creek along a defile near the towns of Hollywood, Arkansas (sometimes known as Spoonville or Witherspoonville) and Antoine, Arkansas. A Confederate States Army cavalry brigade under Brigadier General Joseph O. Shelby attacked a Union supply train of more than 200 wagons accompanying Union Army Major General Frederick Steele's force which was attempting to reach Shreveport, Louisiana to join with Major General Nathaniel Banks's force in the Red River Campaign with the objective of occupying Shreveport and controlling western Louisiana.

The wagon train was guarded by the Twenty-ninth Iowa Infantry Regiment, the Fiftieth Indiana Infantry Regiment and the Ninth Wisconsin Volunteer Infantry Regiment. The skirmish was one of the earlier engagements associated with Steele’s attempt to push southwest from Little Rock, Arkansas to join Banks, who was expected to reach Shreveport in early April. Although the Union force drove off the Confederates with minimal loss to their supplies, and only a small number of casualties, the Union column suffered delays which they could ill afford and also were forced to change their line of march. Steele's force was quickly running short of provisions on their slow march, which was delayed by rain as well as Confederate harassment, and could only get more supplies through difficult foraging in a sparse territory or by having them delivered to them from their bases at Little Rock, Pine Bluff, Arkansas or Fort Smith, Arkansas.

The Union's tactical victory in skirmishes at Terre Noire Creek did not ultimately contribute to a successful campaign as Steele was forced to divert his march toward Washington, Arkansas and head for Okolona, Arkansas and then Elkin's Ferry, Arkansas, further to the east. Ultimately, he had to move back to the southeast and occupy Camden to seek supplies from foraging and his depots. Finally, on April 27, 1864, Steele had to retreat to Little Rock after learning that Banks had been defeated and was in retreat while Confederate reinforcements were headed toward his force from Louisiana.

== Background ==
When Ulysses S. Grant was appointed lieutenant general and general in chief of the Union Army on March 9, 1864, he decided to put all Union armies in motion against the Confederate forces continuously until the war was won. He specifically wanted to send armies to press the main Confederate armies near Richmond, Virginia and Atlanta, Georgia and to tie down a large Confederate force, including reserves in Mississippi and Alabama, at Mobile, Alabama. Previously, however, President Lincoln had acceded to a plan by Major General Henry Halleck, then general in chief, to have Major General Nathaniel P. Banks, a leader of the Democratic Party, extend Union control over western Louisiana and Texas by defeating the forces of Confederate General E. Kirby Smith in the Trans-Mississippi Department, who had his headquarters and a major supply depot at Shreveport. Grant did not approve of this plan because the forces in the Trans-Mississippi already were cut off from the rest of the Confederacy and could not influence the outcome of Grant's major campaigns. Grant could not stop the campaign up the Red River but only could urge that it be completed quickly so that Banks's force could be used to attack Mobile, which Banks himself actually preferred to do, at least at first. The port was a more important objective in itself and its defense would tie down Confederate troops that otherwise could be used and Union forces elsewhere east of the Mississippi River.

Banks's plan in March 1864, as conceived by Halleck, was to advance to Shreveport, Louisiana along the Red River where he could be supported by Union gunboats commanded by Rear Admiral David Dixon Porter. Major General Frederick Steele would move a large force from Little Rock, Arkansas to join Banks at Shreveport. The original plan had Banks then moving his force into Texas. President Abraham Lincoln agreed to this plan because he was concerned that Napoleon III of France, who might be sympathetic to the Confederacy, was setting up a puppet regime under Maximilian I in Mexico. In furtherance of the plan, Halleck assigned 10,000 men from Major General William T. Sherman's army at Vicksburg, Mississippi temporarily to Banks. Under the circumstances involving politics and a plan set in motion before he was in charge, Grant could not stop the campaign but he ordered Banks to go no further than Shreveport, to leave Steele to control the territory, to return to New Orleans for further assignment against Mobile and to send Sherman's troops back to him by mid-April if it appeared that Shreveport could not be taken by the end of that month.

During the Fall of 1863 and Winter of 1863-64, Banks had tried to attack along the Texas coast but was unable to hold any significant territory. As spring approached, he agreed to get back to Halleck's plan to take control of Texas by moving up the Red River via Alexandria, Louisiana and Shreveport. Banks's enthusiasm for the campaign grew as he became aware of the cotton that could be seized for the government and the manufacturing plants that had been set up in Shreveport and Texas that could be captured or destroyed and political advantages which could be gained in permitting Louisiana to return to the Union if most of it could be occupied and ten percent of the citizens took an oath of allegiance under Lincoln's Ten-Percent plan.

Banks had 20,000 men available for his campaign in mid-March. He would meet the 10,000 men from Sherman's force, under Major General Andrew Jackson Smith, at Alexandria on March 24, 1864, a week behind schedule, but a day before his own troops arrived. Steele was scheduled to bring 15,000 troops from Arkansas. Steele had started on this journey to the southwest bound for Shreveport on March 23, almost two weeks after Halleck wanted him to begin. Since Steele never made it to Shreveport, he called his campaign from Little Rock to Camden and back again the Camden Expedition, which name has been attached to it since then.

Steele actually opposed participation of his troops in the Red River Campaign because of the difficulty in marching across the wet Arkansas roads, "destitute of provision", and the likelihood his flanks would be exposed and his depots would be inadequately defended from guerrilla attack. He proposed a demonstration against Arkadelphia, Arkansas or another location to the southwest of Little Rock in order to hold Confederate troops in Arkansas. On March 15, however, Steele received a telegram from Grant telling him to cooperate with Banks and to march on Shreveport.

Steele left Little Rock with 5,000 infantry and artillery and 3,000 cavalry on March 23, 1864. On March 17, Steele had ordered Brigadier General John Thayer to bring 4,000 troops to meet Steele's force at Arkadelphia on April 1. A Union cavalry force of 2,000 at the Union base and depot at Pine Bluff, Arkansas under Colonel Powell Clayton was to watch the Confederate force at Camden, Arkansas. Because of expected supply problems over the projected time of the march, Steele placed his men on half-rations from the outset. Confederate Major General Sterling Price commanded the Confederate District of Arkansas at Camden. Price had five cavalry brigades available because Price's infantry had been sent to Louisiana to help in the opposition to Banks's force.

Due to rain-soaked roads, Steele's force did not complete the 70 miles (110 km) march to Arkadelphia until March 29. Steele waited 3 days at Arkadelphia for Thayer but Thayer's force did not arrive during that time. Meanwhile, on March 25, Confederate Brigadier General Joseph O. Shelby left Camden to pursue Steele. Two other Confederate cavalry brigades under Colonel Colton Greene and Brigadier General William Lewis Cabell moved out of Camden on March 28 to get in front of Steele's column. The three brigades were under the overall division command of Brigadier General John S. Marmaduke who traveled with Greene's brigade.

== Skirmishes ==
On April 1, 1864, Steele began a march from Arkadelphia toward the Little Missouri River, 25 miles (40 km) distant, after which his plan was to march to Washington, Arkansas, another 30 miles (48 km) further. Marmaduke learned of Steele's location and ordered Shelby to attack the rear of the Union column while Cabell would go to Antoine to get in front of the Union force and Greene would close in from the south.

After leaving Arkadelphia, before dark on April 1, Steele's men had several large skirmishes with Cabell's brigade before going into camp near Hollywood, Arkansas, also known as Spoonville or Witherspoonville. Shelby camped at Arkadelphia on the night of April 1 while Cabell camped at Antoine Creek, 18 miles (29 km) west of Arkadelphia.

On the morning of April 2, Marmaduke ordered Cabell and Greene to move to a point on the road to Washington called Cottingham's Store, 3 miles (4.8 km) from the Little Missouri River, while each brigade commander left a regiment or battalion behind, along with an artillery battery. Marmaduke decided that from Cottingham's Store, he could reinforce the units left behind along the military road or block any of the fords over the Little Missouri River if Steele diverted his force from the road.

On April 2, Shelby's force of about 1,200 cavalrymen attacked the flank and rear of Steele's trailing wagon train while the wagons were crossing a defile caused by Terre Noire Creek. The Union force held off the attack, crossed the defile and set up artillery and defensive lines on the road. The Confederates crossed the creek but were soon driven back across the Terre Noire, or Wolf, Creek by the Fiftieth Indiana Infantry. Union Colonel Thomas Benton of the Twenty-ninth Iowa Infantry pursued the Confederates for about 1 mile (1.6 km) in order to keep them from making a flank attack. Benton set up artillery on a hill. The artillery inflicted a large number of casualties when the Confederates charged the hill.

While Benton was fighting on the hill, other Confederates from Cabell's brigade attacked the wagon train three more times and were driven back by the Fiftieth Indiana under the command of Lieutenant Colonel Samuel Well and Captain Martin Voegel's Wisconsin battery, all led by Union brigade commander, Brigadier General Samuel A. Rice. Rice reported: "From 12 m. to 6 p.m. there was more or less skirmishing most of the time, and owing to the length of the train, which was some 3 miles, it made its protection a matter of serious difficulty."

The regiment from Cabell's brigade which was left at Antoine attacked and held off the front of the Union column at Terre Noire Creek (Wolf Creek) before gradually giving way and then returning to the rest of their brigade south of the Little Missouri River. At about 2:00 p.m., Steele turned his men off the Washington Road and headed for Okolona, Arkansas and Elkin's Ferry, Arkansas.

Four companies and two artillery pieces from the Ninth Wisconsin Infantry under Colonel Charles Salomon took up the rear guard and were attacked at about 5:00 p.m. The Fiftieth Indiana returned to help the Ninth Wisconsin fight off this attack. More skirmishing continued until dark. The Union train went into camp near Okolona, Arkansas near 10:00 p.m.

The Union commander, Brigadier General Rice, reported 8 killed, 23 wounded and 32 missing during the attacks on April 2. Confederate casualties in the fighting on April 2 were unreported.

== Aftermath ==
The delay caused by the Confederate attacks on Steele's column and subsequent diversion in Steele's line of march was costly as Steele's men were on half rations and had only about one quarter of their rations remaining while they were still over halfway from their destination. Steele needed provisions for his men and he had to detour east to Camden in order to get them.

The Confederates continued to attack Steele's column along their march. After a series of skirmishes or small battles, starting with a battle between Steele's and Marmaduke's forces at Okolona on April 3, and the Battle of Elkin's Ferry on April 3–4, 1864. On April 9, Thayer's force met up with Steele's, but brought almost no food along with them. Steele decided he could not remain in the barren area around Elkin's Ferry and ordered supplies to be sent to him at Camden. After the Battle of Prairie D'Ane, at which the Union column forced the Confederates to withdraw toward Washington, Arkansas, and the Union rear guard screened the Union move, Steele turned his force to the east toward Camden. Camden had been evacuated by the Confederates so their entire force in Arkansas could pursue Steele's men. Steele marched into the Confederate fortifications at Camden having been opposed only in a stiff two-hour fight by Marmaduke's cavalry which had caught up with the Union force but was unable to stop it from entering Camden on the night of April 15. Finding few supplies at Camden, Steele had to send out foraging parties which the Confederates attacked with disastrous results for the Union foraging parties at the Battle of Poison Spring and the Battle of Marks' Mills.

In mid-April, Confederate troops under General E. Kirby Smith began to arrive from Louisiana to oppose Steele after they defeated Banks at the Battle of Mansfield and forced him to retreat in the face of a small remaining force remaining in Louisiana under the command of Lieutenant General Richard Taylor. After Steele's foraging and resupply parties were routed by Confederate cavalry and Steele learned of Banks's defeat and retreat, Steele's remaining force left Camden under cover of darkness on April 27, 1864 and retreated to Little Rock. Steele's men beat off pursuing Confederates at the Battle of Jenkins Ferry on April 30, 1864. Steele's force arrived in Little Rock on May 3, 1863, having sustained almost 3,000 casualties while inflicting only about 2,000 casualties on the Confederate forces.
