= Brighton, Utah =

City in Utah, United States

- Town
- Silver Lake in Brighton

- Seal

- Location of Utah in the United States
- Coordinates: 40°36′14″N 111°34′56″W
- Country: United States
- State: Utah
- County: Salt Lake
- Settled: 1871
- Incorporated: January 1, 2020
- Named for: Thomas Brighton

Government
  - Mayor: Scotty John

Area
  - Land: 15.9981 sq mi (41.435 km^{2})
- Elevation: 8,707 ft (2,654 m)

Population (2020)
  - Total: 432
  - Density: 27.0/sq mi (10.4/km^{2})
- Time zone: UTC-7 (MST)
  - Summer (DST): UTC-6 (MDT)
- ZIP code: 84121
- Area codes: 385, 801
- GNIS feature ID: 1439115
- Website: brighton.utah.gov

Brighton is a town in eastern Salt Lake County, Utah, United States. It is part of the Salt Lake City, Utah Metropolitan Statistical Area.

As of the 2020 census, Brighton had a population of 432.

== Description ==
Brighton is located at the top of Big Cottonwood Canyon and covers an area of 10,238.8 acres (15.9981 sq mi). While the exact number of residents is unknown, as of 2018, the population was estimated to be between 180 and 260.

Both the Brighton Ski Resort and the Solitude Mountain Resort are located in Brighton.

== History ==
The area was first settled in 1871 but remained unincorporated. On November 6, 2018, residents of the area voted for incorporation, which took effect January 1, 2020.

The community had post offices from 1889 to 1905 and from 1946 to 1953.

== Climate ==
Brighton has a high-altitude cold continental climate (Köppen Dsb/Dsc), with dry summers and very snowy winters.

Climate data for Silver Lake, Brighton, Utah, 1991–2020 normals, extremes 1936–present
| Month | Jan | Feb | Mar | Apr | May | Jun | Jul | Aug | Sep | Oct | Nov | Dec | Year |
|---|---|---|---|---|---|---|---|---|---|---|---|---|---|
| Record high °F (°C) | 55 (13) | 57 (14) | 63 (17) | 66 (19) | 77 (25) | 83 (28) | 87 (31) | 86 (30) | 82 (28) | 74 (23) | 69 (21) | 64 (18) | 87 (31) |
| Mean maximum °F (°C) | 45.2 (7.3) | 45.6 (7.6) | 51.0 (10.6) | 57.7 (14.3) | 66.6 (19.2) | 75.7 (24.3) | 80.2 (26.8) | 78.2 (25.7) | 73.5 (23.1) | 64.3 (17.9) | 52.9 (11.6) | 45.8 (7.7) | 80.8 (27.1) |
| Mean daily maximum °F (°C) | 30.5 (−0.8) | 31.1 (−0.5) | 37.0 (2.8) | 42.5 (5.8) | 52.3 (11.3) | 64.2 (17.9) | 72.4 (22.4) | 70.8 (21.6) | 62.0 (16.7) | 49.3 (9.6) | 37.3 (2.9) | 30.0 (−1.1) | 48.3 (9.1) |
| Daily mean °F (°C) | 20.6 (−6.3) | 21.3 (−5.9) | 27.1 (−2.7) | 32.3 (0.2) | 41.4 (5.2) | 51.6 (10.9) | 59.6 (15.3) | 58.2 (14.6) | 50.0 (10.0) | 38.5 (3.6) | 27.5 (−2.5) | 20.3 (−6.5) | 37.4 (3.0) |
| Mean daily minimum °F (°C) | 10.7 (−11.8) | 11.6 (−11.3) | 17.2 (−8.2) | 22.2 (−5.4) | 30.5 (−0.8) | 39.0 (3.9) | 46.7 (8.2) | 45.7 (7.6) | 38.0 (3.3) | 27.7 (−2.4) | 17.6 (−8.0) | 10.6 (−11.9) | 26.5 (−3.1) |
| Mean minimum °F (°C) | −7.3 (−21.8) | −6.2 (−21.2) | −0.4 (−18.0) | 5.4 (−14.8) | 14.2 (−9.9) | 25.9 (−3.4) | 35.1 (1.7) | 34.2 (1.2) | 23.6 (−4.7) | 10.1 (−12.2) | −2.8 (−19.3) | −8.8 (−22.7) | −12.3 (−24.6) |
| Record low °F (°C) | −34 (−37) | −30 (−34) | −21 (−29) | −11 (−24) | 0 (−18) | 14 (−10) | 21 (−6) | 24 (−4) | 6 (−14) | −8 (−22) | −20 (−29) | −29 (−34) | −34 (−37) |
| Average precipitation inches (mm) | 5.17 (131) | 4.36 (111) | 4.48 (114) | 4.27 (108) | 3.37 (86) | 1.67 (42) | 1.06 (27) | 1.84 (47) | 2.21 (56) | 3.23 (82) | 3.93 (100) | 4.30 (109) | 39.89 (1,013) |
| Average snowfall inches (cm) | 71.6 (182) | 56.0 (142) | 49.3 (125) | 45.0 (114) | 16.0 (41) | 2.9 (7.4) | 0.0 (0.0) | 0.0 (0.0) | 1.6 (4.1) | 23.2 (59) | 49.3 (125) | 65.9 (167) | 380.8 (966.5) |
| Average extreme snow depth inches (cm) | 62.5 (159) | 74.0 (188) | 79.5 (202) | 70.5 (179) | 46.6 (118) | 8.5 (22) | 0.0 (0.0) | 0.0 (0.0) | 1.6 (4.1) | 10.8 (27) | 27.2 (69) | 44.7 (114) | 82.1 (209) |
| Average precipitation days (≥ 0.01 in) | 12.4 | 11.2 | 11.4 | 11.8 | 10.0 | 4.8 | 5.0 | 7.5 | 7.1 | 8.3 | 12.0 | 15.0 | 116.5 |
| Average snowy days (≥ 0.1 in) | 12.7 | 10.6 | 10.3 | 9.5 | 4.0 | 0.9 | 0.0 | 0.0 | 0.6 | 5.3 | 10.5 | 13.9 | 78.3 |
Source 1: NOAA
Source 2: National Weather Service

== See also ==
- List of cities and towns in Utah
