= 5th Missouri Infantry Regiment (Union, 3 months) =

5th Missouri Volunteer Infantry (3 Months)
- Active: May 18, 1861, to August 27, 1861
- Country: United States
- Allegiance: Union
- Branch: Infantry
- Engagements: Expedition to SW Missouri; Battle of Carthage; Expedition towards Fayette, Missouri; Battle of Wilson's Creek

The 5th Missouri Infantry Regiment evolved from a network of several unofficial pro-Unionist militia groups formed semi-secretly in St. Louis in the early months of 1861 by Congressman Francis Preston Blair Jr. and other Unionist activists. The Fifth Missouri was largely composed of ethnic Germans, who were generally opposed to slavery and strongly supportive of the Unionist cause. Although initially without any official standing, beginning on April 22, 1861, the militia regiments Blair helped organize were sworn into Federal service at the St. Louis Arsenal by Captain John Schofield acting on the authority of President Lincoln.

Upon entry into Federal service the members of the Fifth Missouri elected C. E. Solomon colonel of the regiment.

== Military service ==
After the breakdown of negotiations between Missouri Governor Claiborne Fox Jackson and General Nathaniel Lyon on June 12, 1861, the Third Missouri was part of a complex movement against the Missouri State Guard. One force, under Brigadier General Lyon moved up the Missouri River by steamer, to capture the State capital at Jefferson City. A second brigade, composed of the 3rd and 5th Missouri and two batteries of artillery moved into southwest Missouri under the overall command of Colonel Sigel, to cut off any Missouri State Guard troops which might move south before Lyon's advance.

Colonel Sigel took his force to Rolla, thence to Springfield, Missouri, arriving on June 25. They marched to Neosho (June 26–30) and were forced to retreat to Mt. Vernon in the face of a large force of State Guardsmen.

On July 5, Sigel's force of 1,100 met 4,000 State Guardsmen (and 2,000 unarmed Guard recruits) at the Battle of Carthage. Confronted with the large force of Guardsmen Sigel retreated in good order into Carthage and successfully disengaged and retreated to Sarcoxie that night.

The Fifth Missouri joined with General Lyon's force at Springfield, and participated in the August 10 Battle of Wilson's Creek. The Fifth was again part of a brigade (with the Third Missouri) under Colonel Sigel. Sigel's 2nd Brigade initially had significant success, attacking Confederate cavalry on the southeast corner of the southern camps (at the Sharp Farm). After driving off these southern troops, Sigel halted his brigade across the Wire Road, above Skeeg's Branch (Creek). However, Sigel positioned his artillery badly (behind the military crest of the ridge) and cautioned his men against accidentally firing on Federal troops he expected to be advancing south down the Wire Road (the 1st Iowa Infantry was uniformed in grey). At this point, Confederate Brigadier Ben McCulloch lead an attack south down the Wire Road, with the respected Third Louisiana Infantry in the fore. Skirmishers, officers, and Sigel himself mistook the Louisiana troops for the Iowa infantry allowing them to advance to point blank range before they delivering a devastating volley into the confused Federal troops. Sigel shouted "they make a mistake" as his brigade was overrun.

The majority of the shattered Fifth Missouri escaped, and eventually rejoined the Federal force retreating to Springfield, and then back to Rolla. From there the regiment was ordered back to St. Louis to be demobilized.

All companies of the regiment were mustered out by August 27, 1861. The regiment does not share lineage with the 5th Missouri Volunteer Infantry (3 Years Service), which was subsequently organized in March 1862.

== Casualties ==
Regiment lost during service 1 officer and 24 enlisted men killed and mortally wounded and 1 officer and 32 enlisted men by disease. Total 58.
