= Cecret Lake =

Alpine lake in Utah

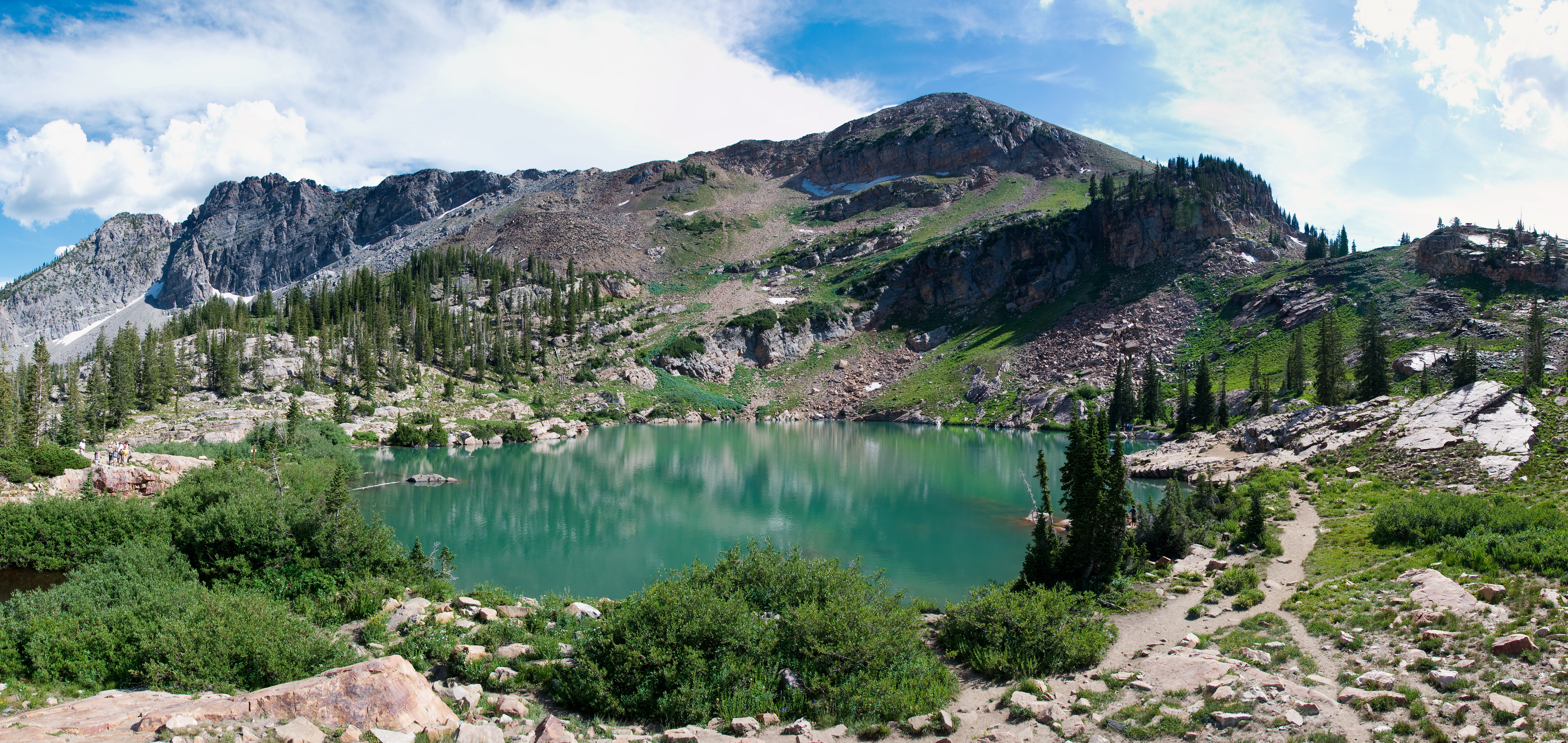

- Location within Utah Location within the United States
- Location: Alta, Salt Lake County, Utah
- Coordinates: 40.570°N 111.622°W
- Type: Reservoir
- Basin countries: United States
- Surface elevation: 9,875 feet (3,010 m)
- Islands: None
- Settlements: Alta

Cecret Lake (pronounced like Secret) is a small alpine lake in Albion Basin which is within the town limits of Alta in the U.S. state of Utah. This area is also part of the Wasatch National Forest. Cecret Lake is also a protected watershed for Salt Lake City. The United States Geological Survey officially spells the name of this lake as "Cecret Lake".

The lake can be accessed in the summer by parking on the main road in Little Cottonwood Canyon and hiking up a dirt trail to the lake. The lake is surrounded by quartz monzonite, commonly mistaken for granite rock. Cecret Lake is also surrounded by the Alta and Snowbird ski resorts.

Cecret Lake is considered a watershed area which supplies drinking water for Salt Lake City metropolitan area. This drinking water comes from several hundred inches of snow each year that lasts into July.

== See also ==
- Alta, Utah
- Little Cottonwood Canyon
