= Bogus Basin =

Ski area in Idaho, United States

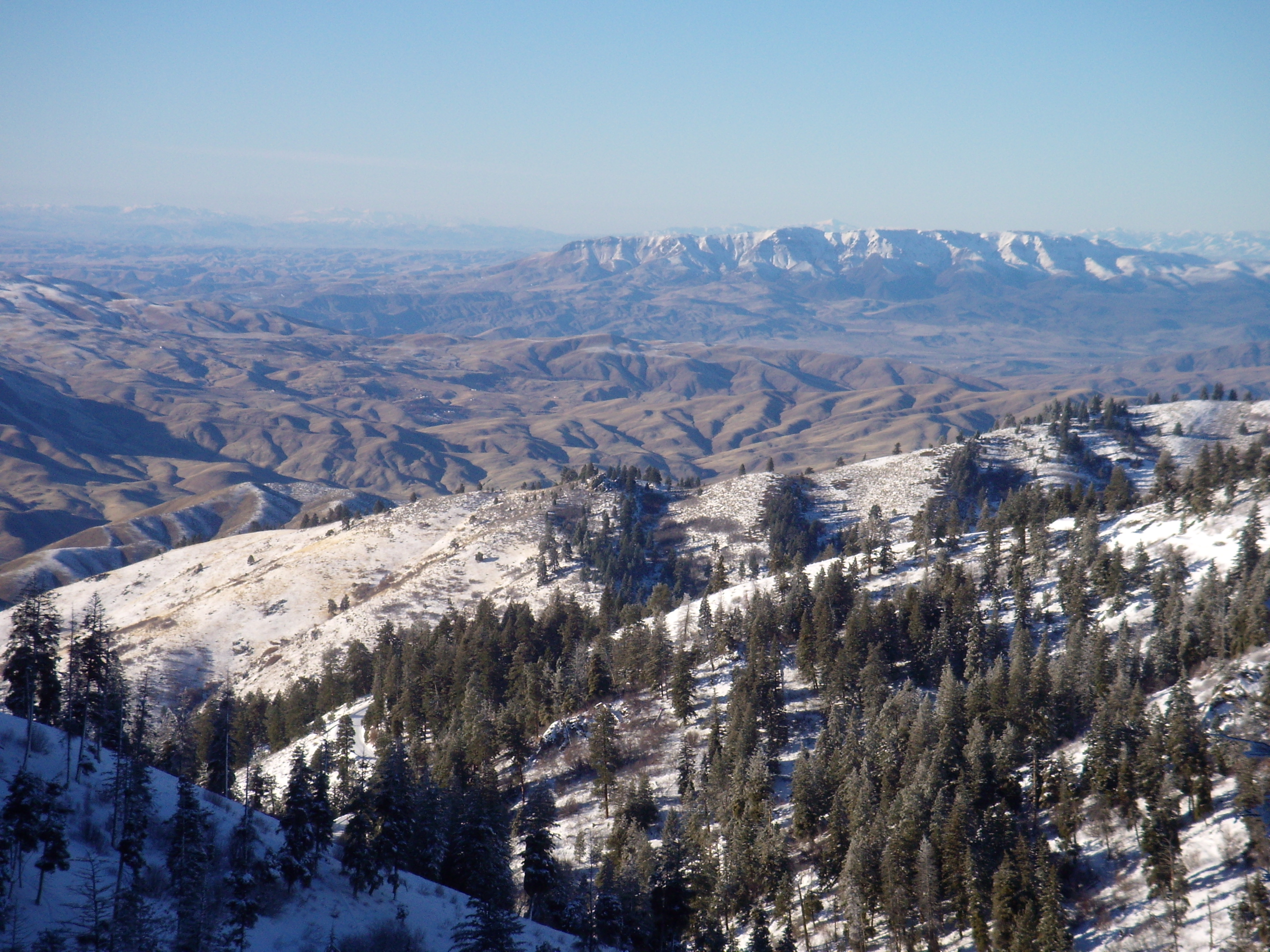
- View from the backside of Bogus Basin

- Location in the United States Location in Idaho
- Location: Boise National Forest; Boise County, Idaho, U.S.
- Nearest city: Boise - 16 miles (26 km)
- Coordinates: 43.764°N 116.104°W
- Status: Operating
- Vertical: 1,790 ft (546 m)
- Top elevation: 7,582 ft (2,311 m) AMSL
- Base elevation: 5,790 ft (1,765 m); Pine Creek - (Chair 6); 6,150 ft (1,875 m) main base area - (Chair 1)
- Skiable area: 2,600 acres (10.5 km^{2})
- Trails: 90: 22% easiest; 45% more difficult; 33% most difficult
- Longest run: Paradise; 1.5 miles (2.4 km)
- Lift system: 7 chairlifts: 4 hi-speed quads - (# 1,2,3,6); 3 double - (# 4,5,7); 4 magic carpets
- Terrain parks: 1/2
- Snowfall: 250 in (640 cm)
- Snowmaking: Portable and fixed
- Night skiing: 5 chairlifts - (# 1,2,3,4,7); until 10 pm - 7 nights / wk; 165 acres (0.67 km^{2})
- Website: Bogus Basin.org

Bogus Basin Mountain Recreation Area is a ski area in the western United States, located in Boise County, Idaho, sixteen road miles (26 km) north-northeast of the city of Boise.

Bogus is operated by the Bogus Basin Recreation Association, a non-profit organization, on private and leased land in the Boise National Forest. Ski season generally runs from Thanksgiving weekend until the weekend preceding April 15, depending on snow conditions. The area also has cross-country skiing on 23 miles (37 km) of Nordic trails.

== History ==
The area probably got its name during the 19th-century gold rush. Crooks in the hills above Boise City, known as "spelterers", would make bogus gold dust by heating lead filings with a bit of real gold dust.

Alf Engen, the father of the American powder technique, selected the site for the ski area at Bogus Basin in 1939. It opened to the public 84 years ago in December 1942 with a 500-foot (150 m) rope tow, and a 3,300-foot (1,010 m) T-bar was installed in 1946. In the early 1950s, Bogus had a 30-meter Nordic ski jump, designed by Corey Engen, and his brother Sverre was Bogus' ski instructor.

The first chairlift at Bogus was installed in the fall of 1959 at Deer Point, and night skiing debuted in December 1964. The resort currently operates 7 chairlifts and 4 magic carpets. Four of the chairlifts are high-speed quads (#1 Deer Point, and #6 Pine Creek) were installed in 1996 and 1999, #3 Superior in 2011, and #2 Morning Star in 2019.

Bogus Basin has 2,600 acres (4.1 mi^{2}; 10.5 km^{2}) of mixed runs, bowls, and glades, with 900 acres (3.6 km^{2}) groomed. The lift-served vertical drop is 1,790 ft (546 m) on the east-facing "back side," with a summit elevation of 7,582 ft (2,311 m) above sea level at the top of Shafer Butte, the highest point of the Boise Ridge mountains. This back side of Shafer Butte was opened in January 1977, following the installation of Pine Creek (#6), a double chairlift, the previous summer. A fixed-grip double for 23 seasons, it became a high-speed quad in the summer of 1999.

On the front side, Bogus Basin's southern lift-served summit is at "Doe Point," adjacent to Deer Point, which is slightly higher and covered with communications towers at an elevation of 7,070 feet (2,155 m). Both vantage points overlook Boise and the entire Treasure Valley, over 4,000 vertical feet (1,220 m) below. Bogus' base area and main day lodge (J. R. Simplot Lodge, formerly Bogus Creek) are at 6,150 ft (1,875 m), at the base of the north-facing slopes served by the Deer Point Express (#1), a high-speed quad installed in the summer of 1996. The original double chairlift on #1 was installed in 1959 and upgraded in 1981. Showcase (#4), a double chairlift that had replaced a surface poma lift in 1972, is east of and parallel with the Deer Point Express. The original Deer Point lift was relocated and renamed Coach (#7) in 1996, servicing the beginner learning area. It honors Bill "Coach" Everts, an early area manager (1953–58) and longtime director.

At mid-mountain, a second day lodge (Pioneer Lodge - 1973) sits at 6,800 feet (2,070 m) with a sizable parking lot, a cluster of condominia (1975), and the Jason Harper Training Center. From the Pioneer area, there is direct access to the gentle south-facing slopes served by a high-speed quad chairlift, Morning Star (#2) and the north-facing slopes of the Bitterroot (#5), a quad chair lift (vertical: 525 ft (160 m)), which runs only on weekends and holidays. In addition, there is connecting trail access to the base of the Superior Express (#3) lift. With its 1,500-foot (457 m) vertical rise, the Superior Express serves the advanced and expert terrain on the northern face of Shafer Butte, unloading at 7,480 feet (2,280 m). It replaced a Riblet double chairlift built in 1965, and cut the ride time of the original lift in half. Night skiing was added to the Superior area with the installation of lights in the summer of 1986, and Morning Star was converted from a double to a triple chairlift in 1999 then to a quad chairlift in 2019.

Historically, Bogus Basin's average annual snowfall is 200–250 inches (510–640 cm), but since 2011, the snowfall has been well below average. Due to limited water resources, there is no significant snow making, only small portable units for patching. Night skiing is available on 165 acres (0.67 km^{2}) on runs served by five of the chairlifts (none on #5 or #6). Three terrain parks are also available; two on the Deer Point mountain, one for advanced, the other for beginner to intermediate skill levels. The Sunshine Park is located on the Morning Star side of the mountain.

The main day lodge at Bogus Creek was built in 1962 and expanded in 1991; its ground floor contains the ticket office and ski lockers. In 2002 it was named for agribusiness magnate J. R. Simplot (1909–2008), because without him there might not be a Bogus Basin. When the fledgling ski area was struggling to pay its debts in 1953, Simplot bought its ski lifts and other mountain improvements from the Kingcliffe Co. and leased them back to the Bogus Basin Recreational Association for $1,500 per year for ten years. His intervention averted almost certain financial demise and won the everlasting gratitude of a generation of skiers. Simplot was later the driving force behind Brundage Mountain northwest of McCall, which opened in November 1961.

== Chairlifts ==
- Bogus Basin has 7 chairlifts, and 4 magic carpets.
- As of 2024-25 ski season, Coach and Bitterroot chairlifts have been replaced by newly built Fixed-grip Skytrac lifts. Their predecessors (1981 Yan lift and 1973 Riblet lift) have been removed and their lift paths have been relocated to a higher vertical. Concept graphics are available on bogusbasin.org as well as specific information.

Number	Name	Type	Manufacturer	Built	Vertical (feet)	Length (feet)	Ride Time (minutes)
1	Deer Point Express	High Speed Quad	Doppelmayr	1996	888	3800	3.8
2	Morning Star Express	High Speed Quad	Doppelmayr	2019	635	2960	3
3	Superior Express	High Speed Quad	Doppelmayr	2011	1448	3923	3.9
4	Showcase	Double	Riblet	1972	702	3470	6.9
5	Bitterroot	Fixed-grip Quad	Skytrac	2024	TBD	TBD	TBD
6	Pine Creek Express	High Speed Quad	Doppelmayr	1999	1792	5302	5.3
7	Coach	Fixed-grip Quad	Skytrac	2024	TBD	TBD	TBD

== Other activities ==
The GoldRush Tubing Hill opened in the fall of 2003, constructed just west of the main parking lot for about $100,000. Annual revenues from the hill were expected to be four to five times that figure; revenues for its fourth season (2006–07) were just under $140,000.

The Glade Runner is a year-round operating mountain coaster that opened in November 2017. The base station was constructed a few yards from the J. R. Simplot Lodge, and the mountain coaster features 4,330 feet (1,320 m) of track.

Other summer activities are available at Bogus, including climbing, tubing, hiking, mountain biking, and a disc golf course. The disc golf course opened in July 2005, centered at the mid-mountain Pioneer Lodge; the upper area of chair 5 (Bitterroot) hosts the north nine, and the south nine is on the upper area of chair 2 (Morning Star).

== Bogus Basin Road ==
Bogus is accessed by Bogus Basin Road (an extension of Harrison Boulevard), which twists 16 miles (26 km) from the Boise city limits to the resort, only ten miles (16 km) NNE as the crow flies.

The two-lane road turns 172 times and gains 3,400 feet (1,040 m) in elevation as the terrain changes from dry sagebrush foothills to snow-laden mountain forest. Originally a gravel road constructed by CCC crews (funded by the WPA) from 1938 to 1940, Bogus Basin Road was first paved in 1962, widened in 1974, and improved in 1998. Before its paving, it was a one-way road in ski season, with the direction changed to downhill in the early afternoon.

== Season passes ==
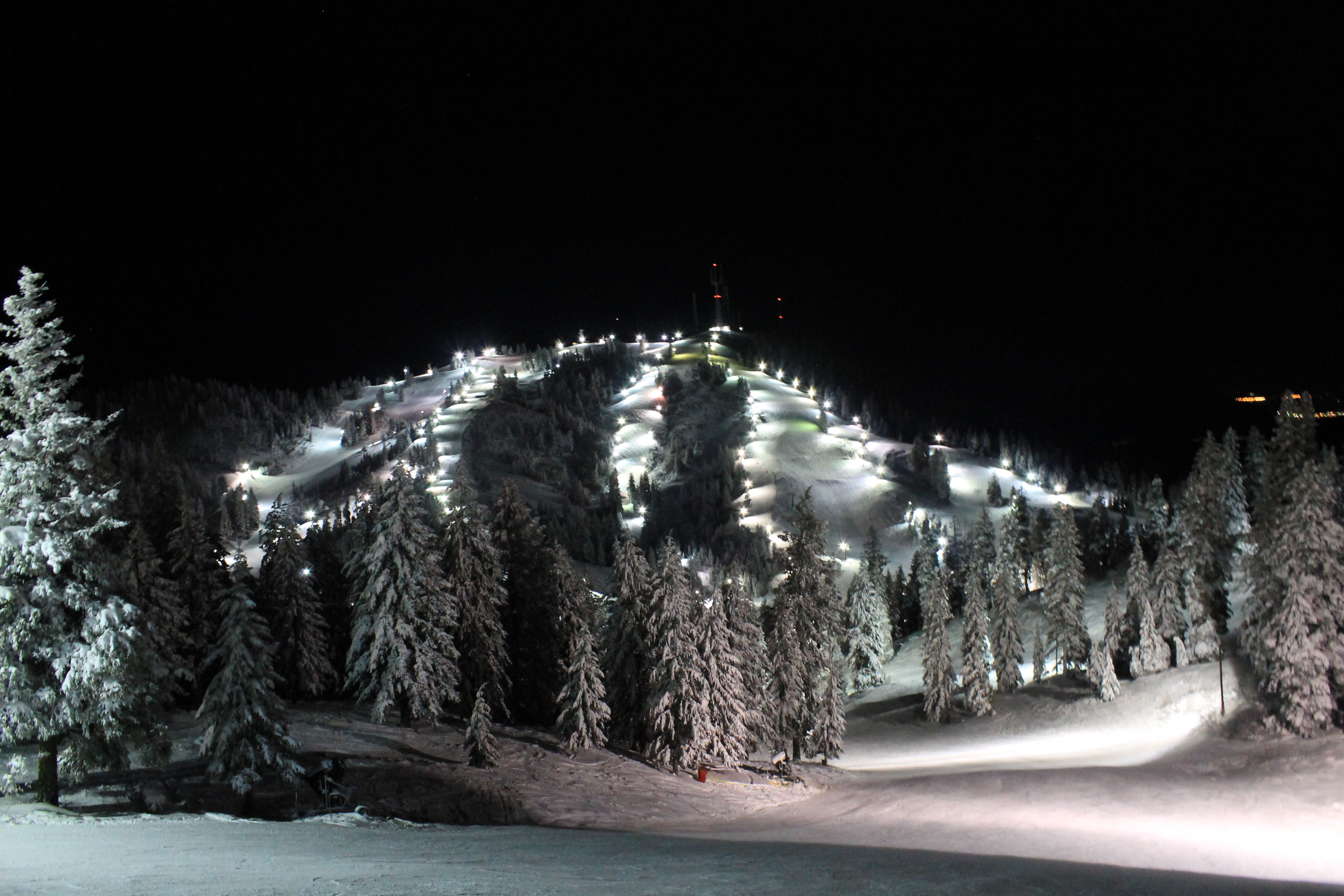
Bogus Basin, 2019

In March 1998, Bogus' general manager Mike Shirley reduced the cost of an adult season pass from $500 to $199, lowering the break-even point to just seven visits (and kids' season passes fell to just $29). Bogus Basin sold nearly nine times as many passes for the 1998–99 season versus the previous year, halting the pass sales at 25,000 (2,854 for the 1997–98 season).

The new pricing strategy generated almost four times as much revenue (nearly $3.6 million) from season pass sales, all before June, six months before the season would begin. Total skier visits went from under 192,000 to over 303,000 (up 58%). Although the sales of day tickets ($31 each) expectedly fell (almost 50%), Bogus' total revenue increased by $2.6 million (up 55%) to $7.3 million for the 1998-99 ski season.

Shirley's deep-discount strategy was effective: resorts from coast to coast lowered their prices for multi-day, multi-area, and season passes. Locally, ski equipment sales increased significantly as skiers upgraded their gear.

The $199 price was in effect for fifteen years, until raised to $229 for the 2013–14 season.

Seniors (age 70 and over) skied for free at Bogus through March 2015; the policy was changed that summer. For the 2015–16 season, season passes for seniors were priced at $199 and one-day lift tickets at $44, a discount of ten dollars off the regular daily rate.

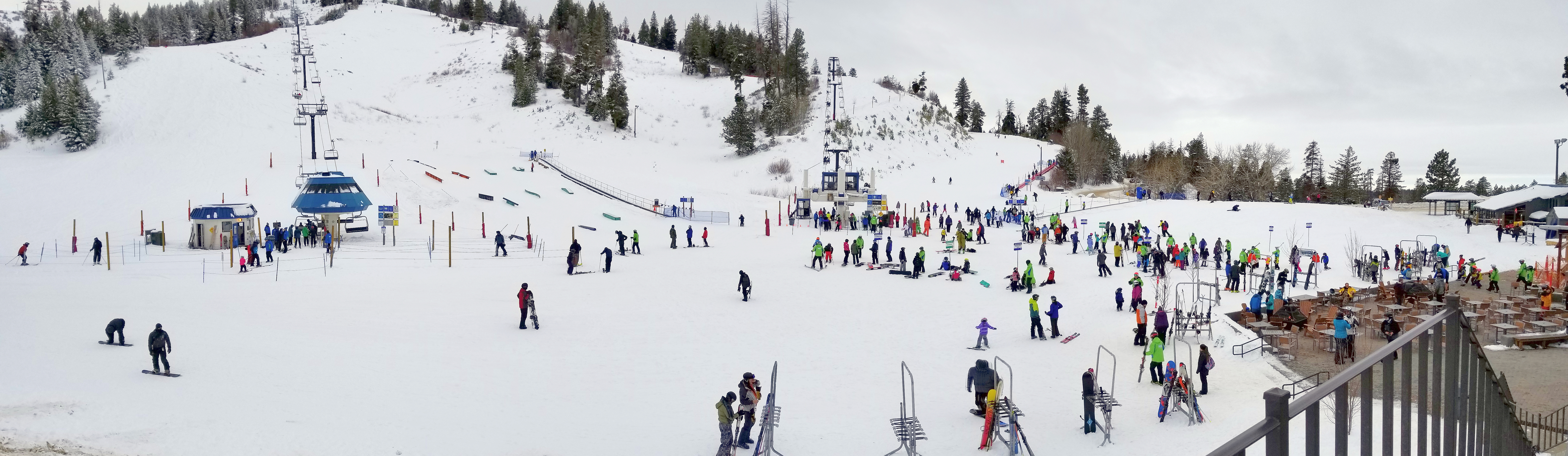
Bogus Basin in 2017

== United States Ski Team ==
Members of the U.S. Ski Team from Bogus Basin include:

- Jeret Peterson – (1981–2011), freestyle aerials, 2005 World Cup champion, 2010 Olympic silver medalist
- Dane Spencer – (b. 1977) – giant slalom – currently a World Cup assistant coach with the U.S. Ski Team
- Erik Fisher – (b. 1985) – downhill
- Sandy Shellworth – (b. 1944) – 1968 Olympian, 21st in women's downhill, 1967 U.S. champion in giant slalom.
- Walt Falk – (b. 1947) – competed in downhill at 1966 World Championships
- Sara Studebaker – (b. 1984) – biathlon, 2010 & 2014 Olympian, 7th in 2014 women's team relay

== General managers ==
After 21 seasons, Mike Shirley announced in February 2012 that he was stepping down as general manager and president, and was succeeded by Alan Moore, the former vice president of finance. Shirley was a former vice president with Morrison-Knudsen Co. and initially hired as an interim manager after the resignation of Terry Lofsvold in November 1991. After the search committee determined he was the best candidate, he was hired in April, the first general manager at Bogus with an extensive background in finance.

Moore stepped down in 2015 and was succeeded in November by Brad Wilson, formerly the general manager at Diamond Peak, Nevada, at northeast Lake Tahoe.

General Manager	Ski Seasons	Years
Bill Everts, Jr.^	5	1953–1958
Bob Loughery	26	1958–1984
Terry Lofsvold	7	1984–1991
Mike Shirley	21	1991–2012
Alan Moore	3	2012–2015
Brad Wilson	9th	2015–

^ unpaid volunteer
