= Engen (surname) =

Engen is a surname of Scandinavian origin which may refer to:

- Alexandra Engen (born 1988), Swedish cross country cyclist
- Alf Engen (1909–1997), Norwegian-American skier and skiing school owner/teacher
- Asbjørn Engen (1917/1918–1985), Norwegian newspaper editor and organizational leader
- Bjarte Engen Vik, Norwegian Nordic combined athlete
- Chris Engen (actor), American actor
- Corey Engen (1916–2006), American skier
- Donald D. Engen (1924–1999), US Navy vice admiral
- Hans Engen (1912–1966), Norwegian journalist, diplomat and politician
- Ingrid Syrstad Engen (born 1998), Norwegian footballer
- John Engen (1964–2022), American politician from Montana
- Jon Engen (1957–2018), American skier
- Kieth Engen (1925–2004), American operatic bass and pop singer
- Rolf Engen (1929–2018), American businessman
- Ståle Engen (born 1947), Norwegian long-distance runner
- Svein Engen (born 1953), Norwegian biathlete
- Sverre Engen (1911–2001), Norwegian-American skier, ski coach, ski area manager and film-maker
- Whitney Engen (born 1987), American soccer player
