= Snowbird, Utah =

Unincorporated community in Utah

Snowbird

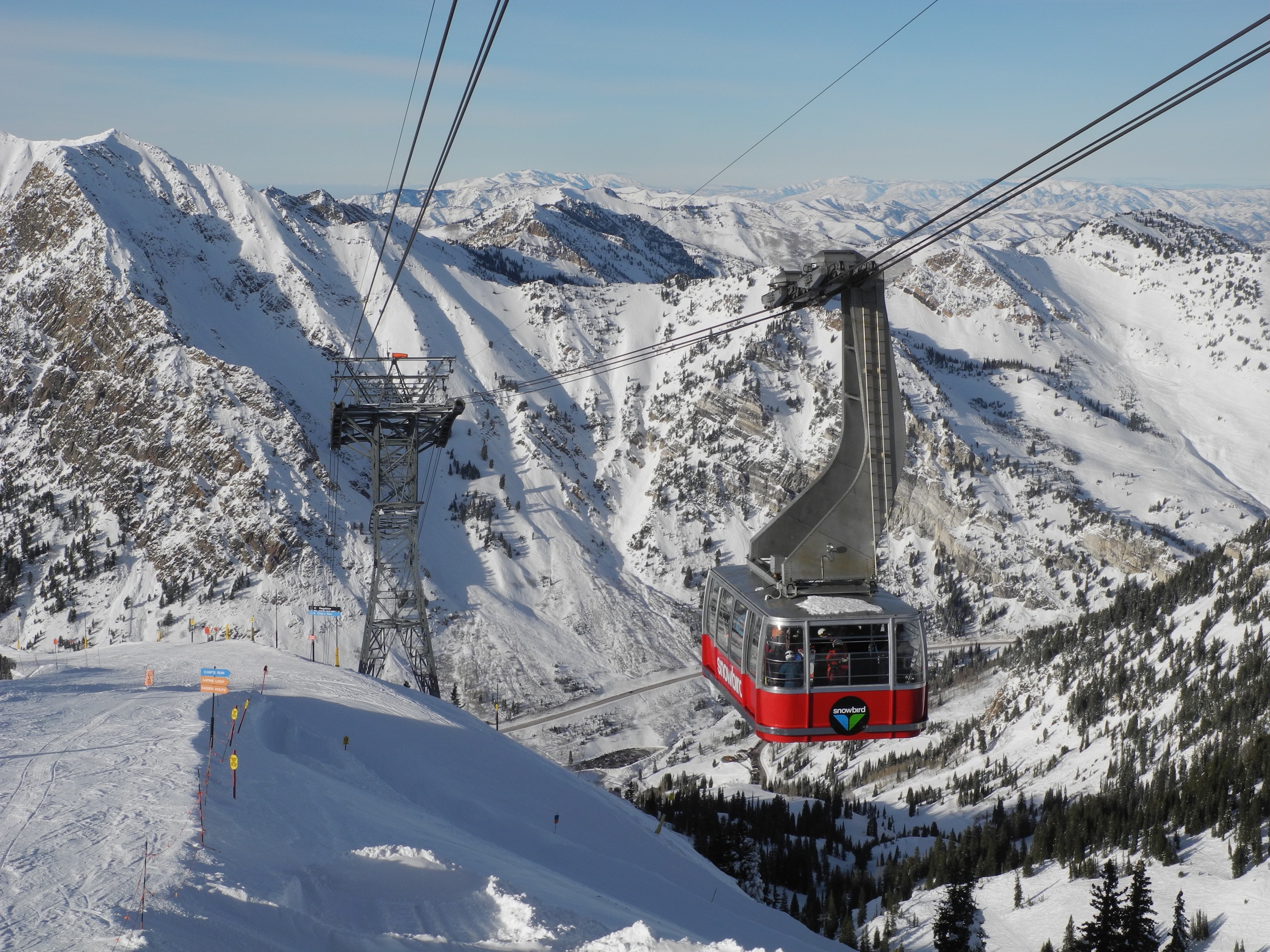
- One of two cable cars composing the Aerial Tram at Snowbird in 2016

- Location in Utah Snowbird (the United States)
- Location: Wasatch National Forest; Little Cottonwood Canyon; Salt Lake County, Utah; United States
- Nearest city: Sandy: 4 miles (6 km); Salt Lake City: 29 mi (47 km)
- Coordinates: 40°34′52″N 111°39′23″W
- Vertical: 3,240 ft (988 m)
- Top elevation: 11,000 ft (3,353 m)
- Base elevation: 7,760 ft (2,365 m) lowest chairlift 8,100 feet (2,469 m) main base area
- Skiable area: 2,500 acres (10.1 km^{2})
- Trails: 169; 27% easiest 38% more difficult 35% most difficult
- Longest run: 2.5 miles (4.0 km); Chip's Run
- Lift system: 13 lifts: 1 tram 6 hi-speed quad chairs 4 double chairs 2 surface lifts
- Lift capacity: 17,400 per hour
- Terrain parks: 0
- Snowfall: 500 in (1,270 cm), average record: 838 in (2,130 cm), (2023, as of the 4th of June)
- Night skiing: None
- Website: snowbird.com

Snowbird is an unincorporated community in Little Cottonwood Canyon in the Wasatch Range of the Rocky Mountains near Salt Lake City, Utah, United States. It is most famous for Snowbird Ski and Summer Resort, an alpine skiing and snowboarding area, which opened in December 1971.

== History ==
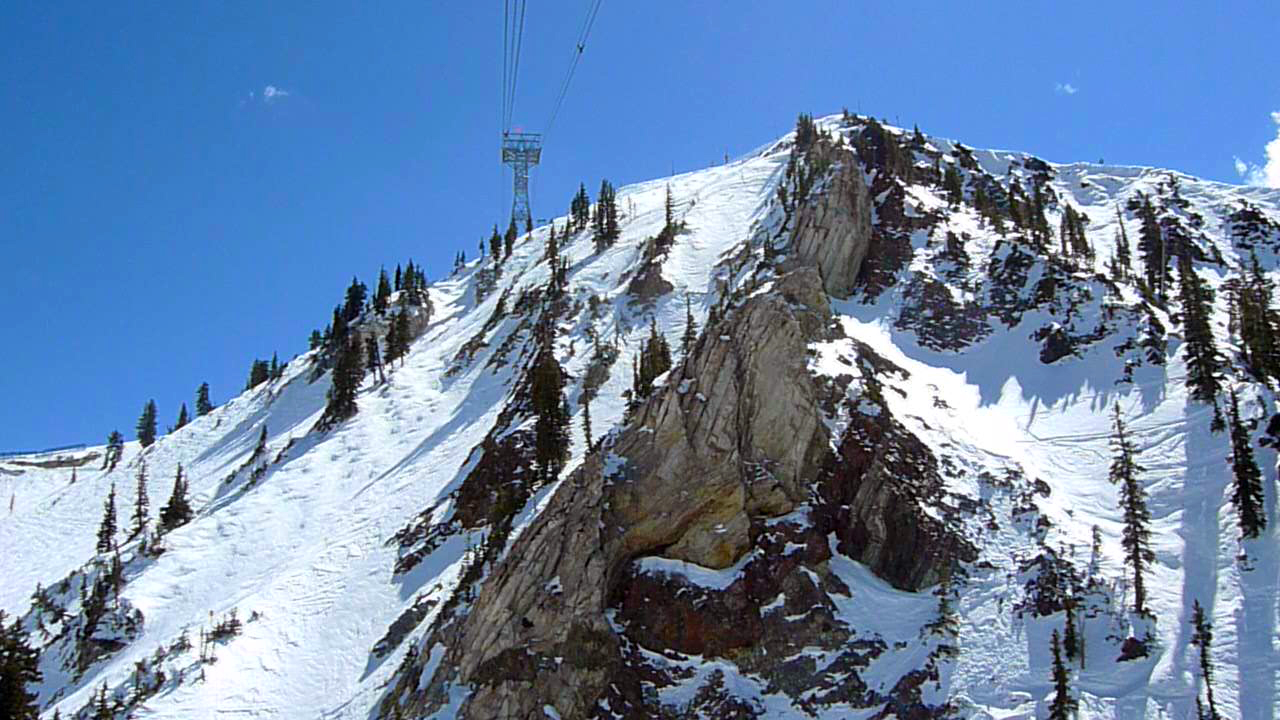
Snowbird, Utah

The development of Little Cottonwood Canyon and the town of Alta dates to the 19th century. A U.S. Army soldier first prospected for silver there in 1869. Mining became a large local industry, and Little Cottonwood Canyon became one of the largest producers of silver ore in the Wasatch Mountains. Known as the Emma Mine (the origin of the name of the Big Emma ski run in Snowbird's Gad Valley), the soldier's find eventually produced more than $3.8 million in silver. At its peak, 8,000 people lived and worked in the narrow canyon, which held two smelters, 138 homes, hotels, boarding houses, stores and a railroad. The entire town was later destroyed by a series of avalanches.

The resort is a multi-facility winter and summer (primarily winter) resort. Mainly known for its winter powder skiing and snowboarding, during other seasons Snowbird also hosts hikers, mountain bikers, fishermen, and other mountain vacationers. The facilities include ski lifts, hotels, condominiums, spa facilities, restaurants, other resort-related retail businesses, and medical services.

The resort operates almost entirely on privately owned land, unlike the majority of Utah ski areas.

The originator of the Snowbird resort concept was Ted Johnson, who had managed the Alta Lodge in the town of Alta at the head of Little Cottonwood Canyon for about a decade. He had explored the terrain below Alta in the Peruvian Gulch and Emma Mine/Gad Valley watersheds that later became Snowbird. Johnson met Dick Bass, a Texas oilman, in 1969, and the two partnered to create the Snowbird resort, which opened in 1971. In 1974, Johnson sold his interest in Snowbird to Bass.

On May 12, 2014, an ownership change was announced. Businessman Ian Cumming became the majority owner, in partnership with Bass, who remained chairman. Dick Bass died in 2015 and Ted Johnson died in 2018.

In July 2021 Snowbird shut down the Tram Club, without any warning or prior intimation to the staff or public. It had been at Snowbird since 1994 and was a hot spot for locals in the community. The tram club was reopened in December 2022.

== Climate ==
Hidden Peak, 10,992 ft (3,350 m), is the highest point within the Snowbird ski area. Hidden Peak has a subalpine climate (Köppen Dfc), bordering on an alpine climate (Köppen ETH). There is no weather station at the summit, but this climate table contains interpolated data for an area around the summit.

Climate data for Hidden Peak (Snowbird) 40.5673 N, 111.6337 W, Elevation: 10,502 ft (3,201 m) (1991–2020 normals)
Month	Jan	Feb	Mar	Apr	May	Jun	Jul	Aug	Sep	Oct	Nov	Dec	Year
Mean daily maximum °F (°C)	26.3 (−3.2)	27.2 (−2.7)	32.2 (0.1)	37.9 (3.3)	47.3 (8.5)	58.7 (14.8)	68.1 (20.1)	66.5 (19.2)	57.6 (14.2)	44.6 (7.0)	33.2 (0.7)	26.6 (−3.0)	43.8 (6.6)
Daily mean °F (°C)	18.1 (−7.7)	18.1 (−7.7)	22.8 (−5.1)	27.7 (−2.4)	36.9 (2.7)	47.5 (8.6)	57.0 (13.9)	55.7 (13.2)	47.2 (8.4)	35.1 (1.7)	24.7 (−4.1)	18.2 (−7.7)	34.1 (1.2)
Mean daily minimum °F (°C)	10.0 (−12.2)	9.0 (−12.8)	13.4 (−10.3)	17.6 (−8.0)	26.6 (−3.0)	36.2 (2.3)	45.9 (7.7)	44.9 (7.2)	36.8 (2.7)	25.6 (−3.6)	16.2 (−8.8)	9.9 (−12.3)	24.3 (−4.3)
Average precipitation inches (mm)	7.26 (184)	6.25 (159)	6.25 (159)	6.15 (156)	4.47 (114)	1.97 (50)	1.37 (35)	2.10 (53)	2.92 (74)	4.26 (108)	5.33 (135)	6.27 (159)	54.6 (1,386)
Source: PRISM Climate Group

== Ski resort ==
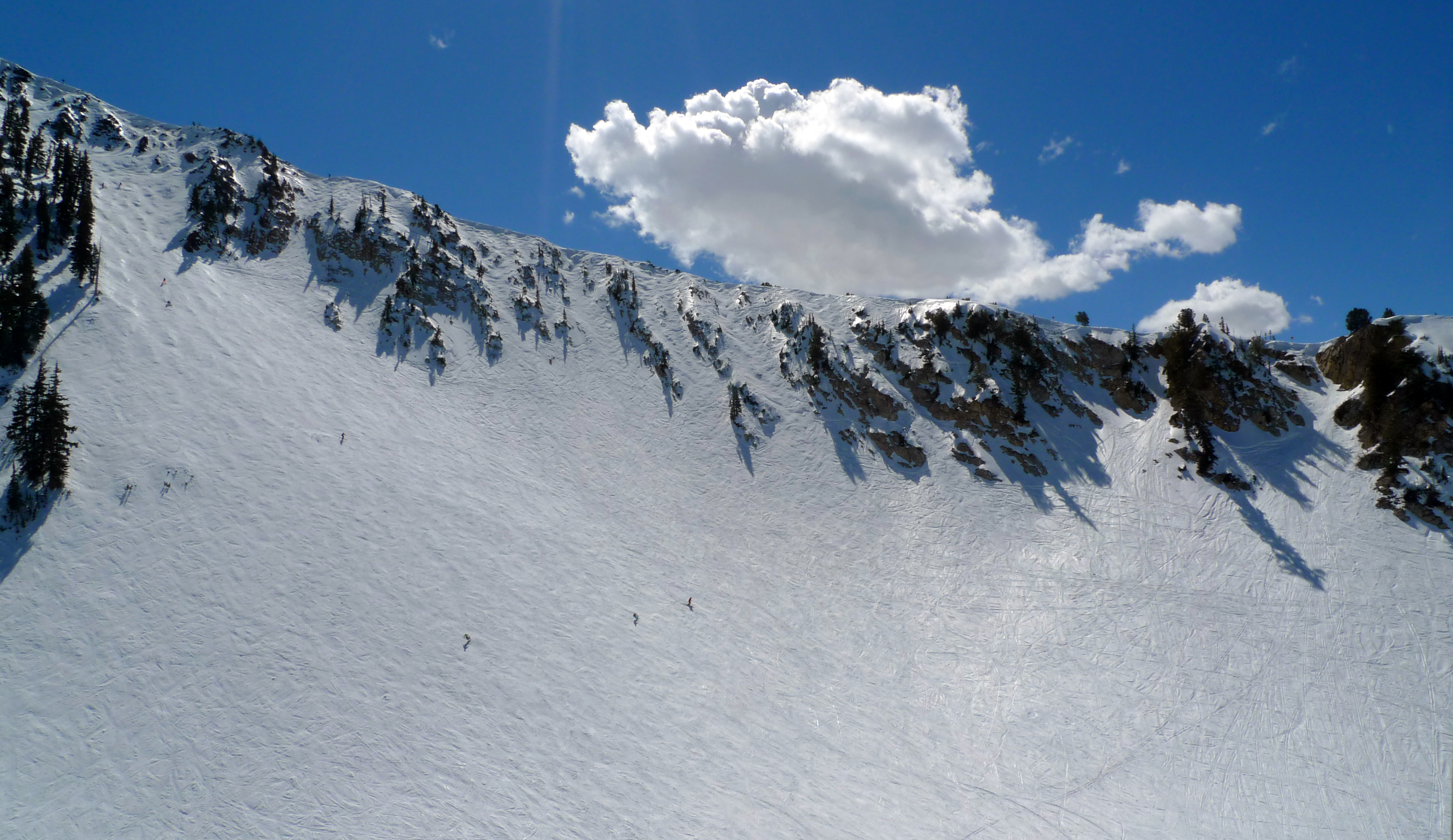
Snowbird: Great Scott - Upper, Middle and Lower Cirque

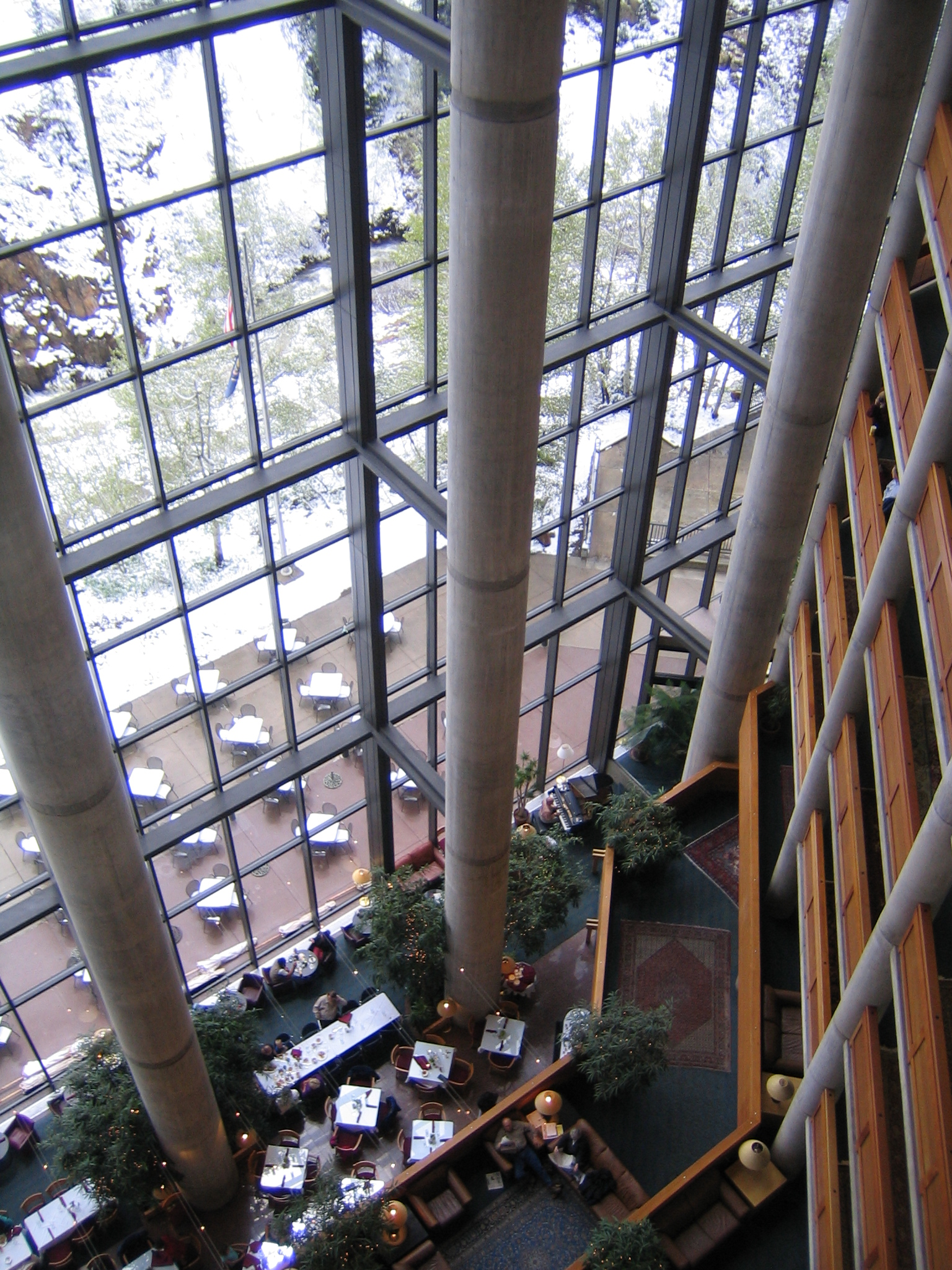
Inside the Snowbird Cliff Lodge in 2006

Snowbird resort is a year-round ski and summer resort located in the heart of the Wasatch National Forest on the eastern border of the Salt Lake City suburb of Sandy. It is 29 miles (47 km) from Salt Lake City International Airport, 24 miles (39 km) from downtown Salt Lake City and 4 miles (6 km) east of the suburb of Sandy. The resort first opened in December 1971.

Snowbird shares Little Cottonwood Canyon with Alta Ski Area to the east, just up the canyon over a ridge that separates the two. Beginning winter 2002, the two resorts offer a joint day pass and a joint season ticket allowing full access all of the terrain on both mountains: 26 ski lifts and tows and a skiable area of 4,700 acres (19 km^{2}). The collaboration coincided with the opening of a new lift in Mineral Basin, a large bowl owned by Snowbird on the back of Snowbird's Hidden Peak and Alta's Sugarloaf mountains that had been skiable within the resort since 1999. The installation of Baldy Express in 2002 allowed access to Alta from the Basin. Other access points between the two resorts exist as well. The offer is open to skiers only, as a result of Alta's skiers-only (no snowboarders) policy.

Both areas receive more than 500 inches (1,270 cm) of snowfall per year due to lake-effect enhancement from the Great Salt Lake, making them the second snowiest ski areas in the United States (after the ones in the Cascades). In contrast to the humid and wet conditions in the Cascades near the Pacific Ocean, the arid condition of the Great Basin produces very dry and powdery snow, making Snowbird and Alta top global destinations for powder-skiing aficionados. Another benefit of being East of the Great Salt Lake is that salt from the lake provides the condensation nuclei that creates ice pellet snow that doesn't pack like normal snowflakes. Loose powder for days after a snowfall is common. On very windy days the salt is lifted thousands of feet and has been known to coat the windshield of airplanes flying into Salt Lake City.

Snowbird usually closes on Memorial Day in late May while the occasional ski year can last as long as the Fourth of July on the upper part of the mountain (accessed by the aerial tram), perennially offering the longest ski season in Utah. Snowbird, which operates primarily on privately owned land, has a skiable area of 2,500 acres (10.1 km^{2}) with a vertical drop of 3,240 feet (988 m) from the summit of Hidden Peak, which has an elevation of above 11,000 feet (3,353 m). Hidden Peak is serviced by an aerial tram from the base area.

The resort covers three drainage areas: Peruvian Gulch, Gad Valley, and Mineral Basin. Snowbird is perennially celebrated by industry magazines for its exceptional snowfall, vast and wide-ranging terrain and easy accessibility from the Salt Lake City International Airport.

Snowbird set a resort record of 776 inches (1,971 cm) of cumulative snow (mid-mountain measurement) in May 2011. Snowbird is known for its particularly challenging terrain, with most ski runs having a difficulty of "intermediates only" or higher. The most difficult part of the mountain is the cirque traverse, which contains all runs for experts only.

=== Lifts ===
Lift Name	Length	Vertical	Type	Make	Year Installed
Aerial Tram	8,395 ft	2,900 ft	Aerial Tram	Garaventa	1971; New Aerial Tram Cabins installed 2022 by Doppelmayr
Baby Thunder	1,966 ft	638 ft	Fixed Double	Doppelmayr	1995
Baldy	3,482 ft	1,019 ft	High Speed Quad	Garaventa CTEC	2001
Chickadee	830 ft	149 ft	Fixed Double	Thiokol	1972; Being replaced in 2026 by SkyTrac Quad
Gad 2	4,017 ft	1,242 ft	High Speed Quad	Doppelmayr	2013
Gadzoom	6,457 ft	1,823 ft	High Speed Quad	Garaventa CTEC	1997
Little Cloud	3,204 ft	1,302 ft	High Speed Quad	Doppelmayr	2012
Mid Gad	4,287 ft	1,315 ft	Fixed Double	Doppelmayr	1980
Mineral Basin	3,515 ft	1,435 ft	High Speed Quad	Garaventa CTEC	1999
Peruvian	8,031 ft	2,421 ft	High Speed Quad	Doppelmayr CTEC	2006
Wilbere	1,968 ft	668 ft	Fixed Quad	Doppelmayr	2024

Snowbird currently has 10 chairlifts (6 high-speed quads, 4 doubles), a surface lift, an aerial tram, and a 600-foot (180 m) tunnel enclosing a one-way conveyor lift connecting Peruvian Gulch to Mineral Basin allowing easier access for beginners and intermediates to new terrain. The tunnel, the only of its kind in North America, also allows for skier transport when winds require the closing of the aerial tram. The tunnel connects the front half of the resort to Mineral Basin, which is the back half of the mountain. Inside of the tunnel, there are also pictures with descriptions about the history of the tunnel's construction.

Video of the Peruvian Tunnel

=== Facilities ===
The Aerial Tram

The resort lodging includes: the Iron Blosam, the Inn, the Lodge at Snowbird, the Cliff Lodge and the Cliff Club. The resort also has gift shops, restaurants, arcades, hiking trails, pools and a rooftop spa. The summit restaurant was built atop Hidden Peak during the summer of 2015.

The resort has 50,000 square feet (4,600 m^{2}) of meeting space, with 31 meeting rooms and a 15,000-square-foot (1,400 m^{2}) Event Center available in the summer.

=== Summer activities ===
While being widely known as a ski resort, Snowbird is also open during the summer. Throughout the warmer months, Snowbird offers activities such as: Alpine Slide, Mountain Coaster, Summer Tubing, Vertical Drop, and Ropes Courses.

The Alpine Slide is a course that runs down the Chickadee ski slope and includes twists, turns, and tunnels. The Mountain Coaster is a wheeled cart track that fits up to two riders. It sits near the base of the Peruvian Express chairlift outside the Snowbird Center. Summer Tubing is the warm weather version of snow tubing and is available to the east of Chickadee by the entrance of the Cliff Lodge. The Vertical Drop is a 50-foot tower drop ride located near the top of Chickadee. The Ropes Course, located near Chickadee bowl, allows participants to be strapped into a harness and walk high above ground. Other activities include hiking and mountain biking.

In the Summer of 2023, Snowbird unveiled the rooftop balcony to the Aerial Tram (the first of its kind in the United States). Guests can spread their wings and ride outside while the Aerial Tram climbs and descends from 11,000 feet with 360-degree views.

=== Awards ===
Skiing Magazine ranked the Alta-Snowbird ski area second in North America overall and first in the United States for the 2003–04 and 2004–05 seasons. According to SKI Magazine (October 2002) Snowbird ranked 20th in North America with gold medals in snow, access, challenge, terrain, scenery, weather, and lifts. In specific categories it was ranked third in North America for snow, fourth in North America for challenge, and fifth in North America for terrain. Snowbird ranks as the second best resort in North America, runner-up to Whistler Blackcomb resort in Canada, according to Skiing Magazine. In 2008, Outside named Alta-Snowbird the number one ski destination in North America. More recently, ZRankings ranked Snowbird as the fourth best ski resort in North America. Snowbird's snowfall and weather is also considered to be amongst the best in the world for skiing; ZRankings rated Snowbird's snow as the second best in North America (behind its next-door neighbor, Alta). Two of Snowbird's mountain school instructors, Rob Sogard and Nancy Thoreson, made SKI Magazine's Top 100 list.

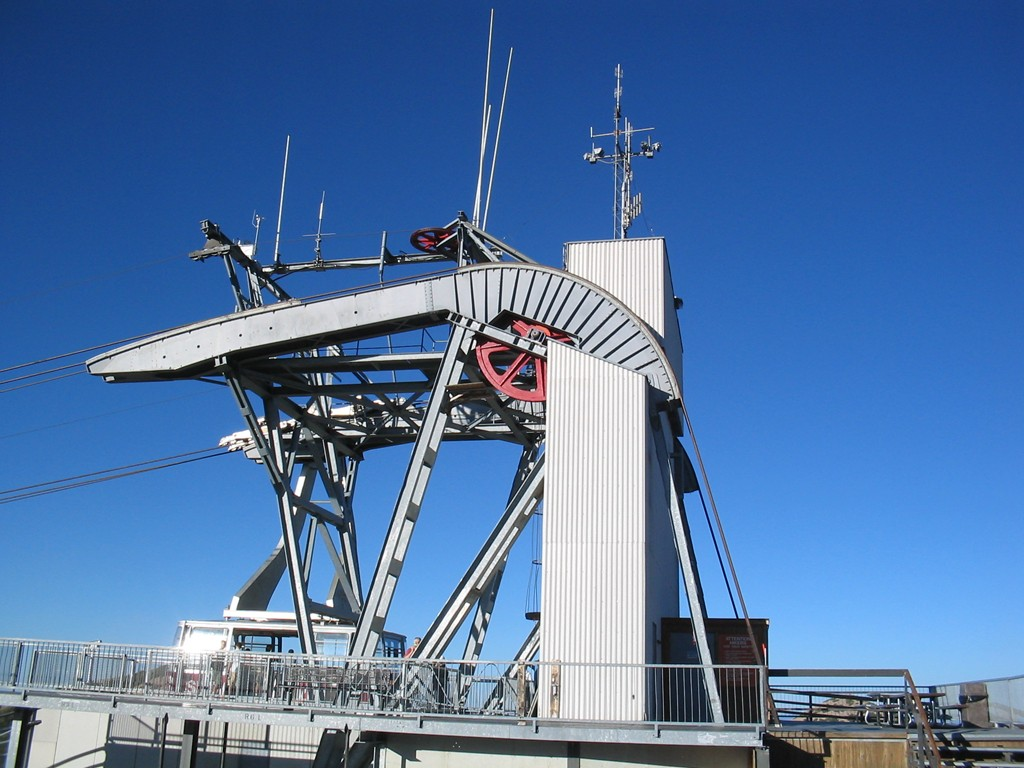
Snowbird, Utah tram top station, mechanical details

== Images ==
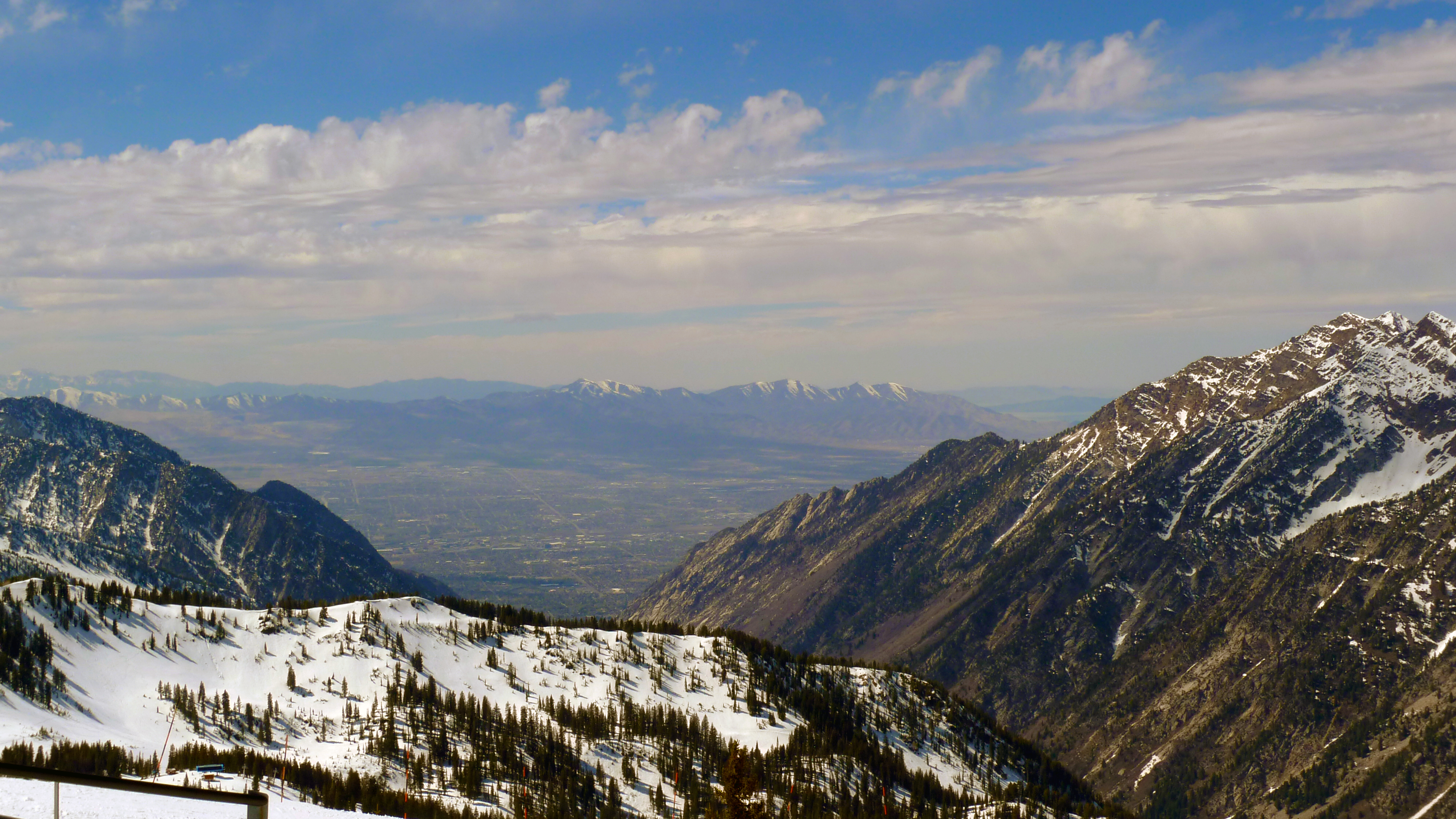
The Salt Lake Valley from Snowbird

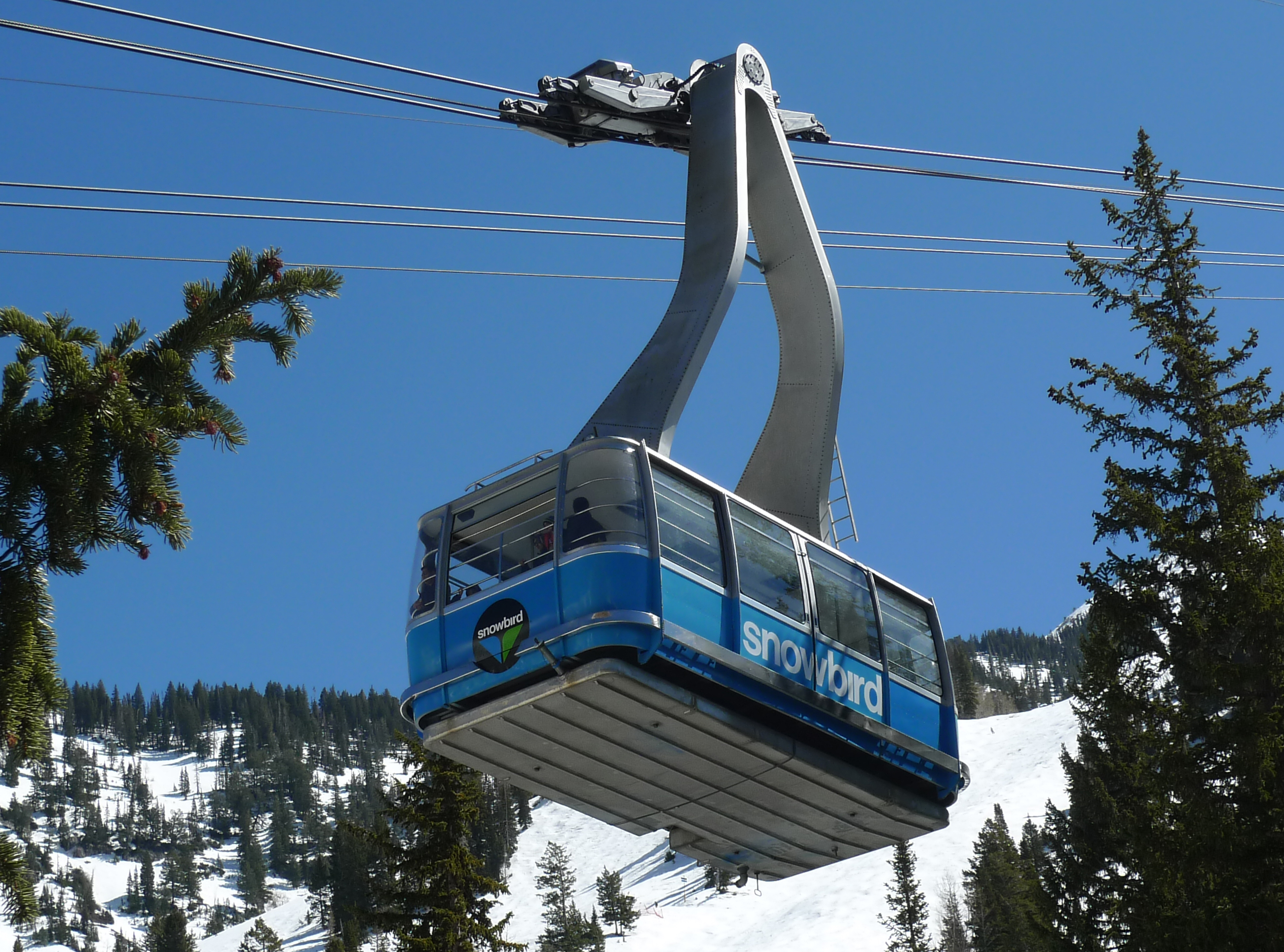
Snowbird Tram to 11,000 ft.

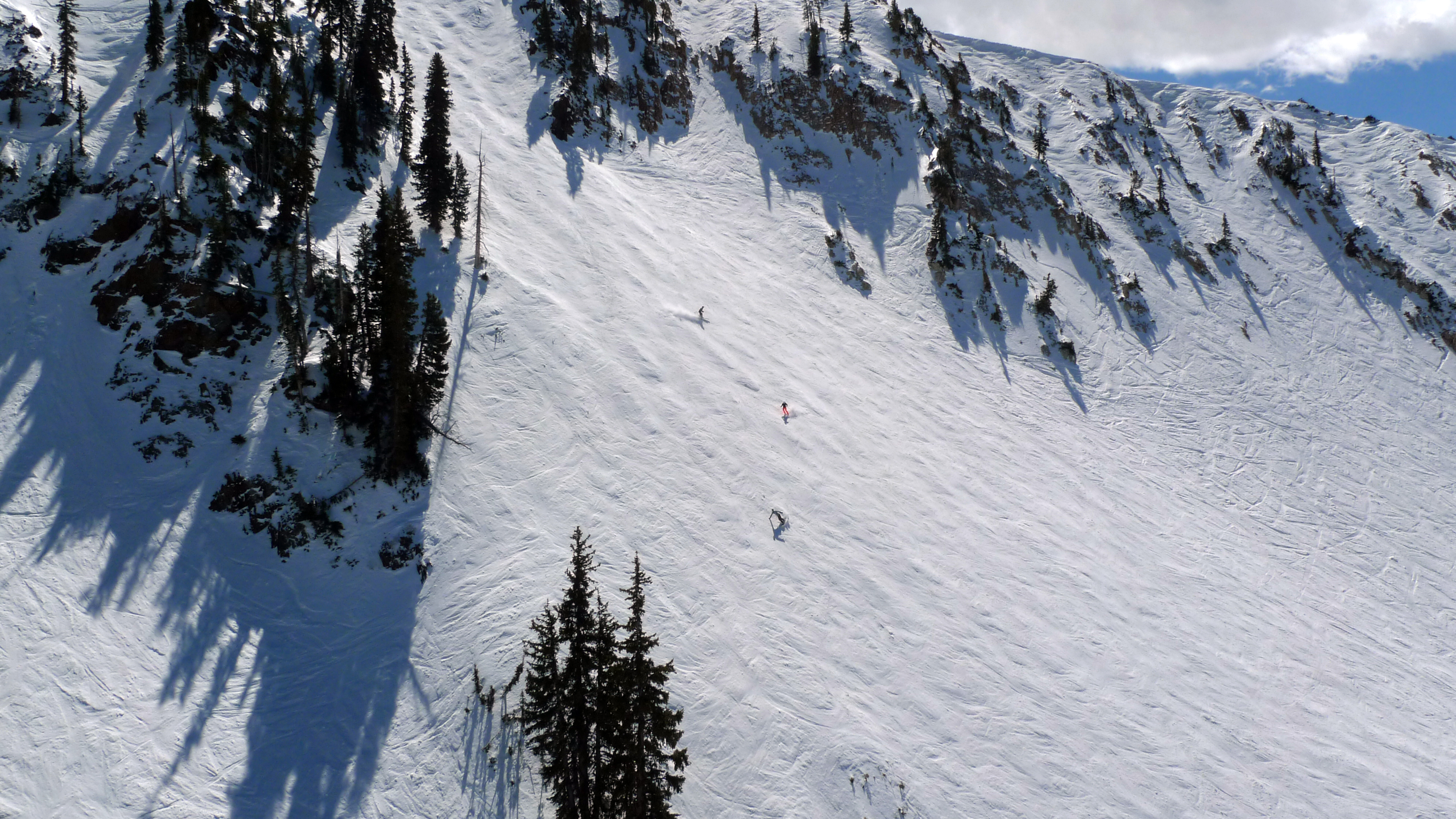
Skiing in Snowbird

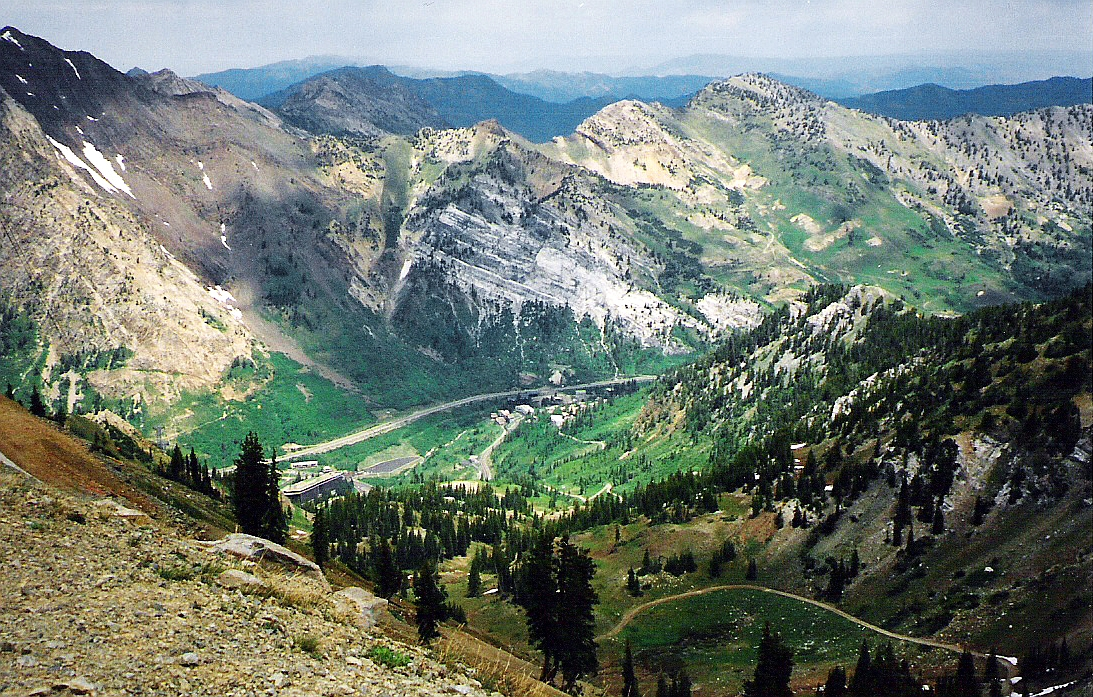
Snowbird mid-June 2003
