= Engen (disambiguation) =

Engen was a Japanese era from 1336 to 1340. Engen may also refer to

- Engen (surname)
- Engen, Germany, a town in Baden-Württemberg, Germany
  - Engen station
  - Battle of Engen between France and the Habsburg Monarchy in 1800
- Engen Petroleum, a South African oil company
- Engen Botswana Limited, a Botswana petroleum company
