= Erik Fisher =

Personal information
- Born: March 21, 1985 (age 41) Ontario, Oregon, U.S.
- Height: 6 ft 1 in (1.85 m)
- Website: erikfisherusa.com

Skiing career
- Sport: Alpine skiing
- Club: Bogus Basin Ski; Education Foundation
- Disciplines: Downhill, Super G
- World Cup debut: November 26, 2005 (age 20)

Olympics
- Teams: 1 - (2010, injured)
- Medals: 0

World Championships
- Teams: 1 - (2009)
- Medals: 0

World Cup
- Seasons: 4th - (2009-12)
- Podiums: 0
- Overall titles: 0
- Discipline titles: 0 - (29th in DH, 2009)
Medal record
Men's alpine skiing
Representing the United States
Junior World Ski Championships
Bronze medal – third place	2005 Bardonecchia	Downhill

Erik Fisher (born March 21, 1985) is a World Cup alpine ski racer with the U.S. Ski Team. From Middleton, Idaho, he primarily competes in the speed events of Downhill and Super G.

Born in Ontario, Oregon, Fisher learned to ski and race at Bogus Basin near Boise, Idaho, beginning at age 3. While growing up, his family moved to different locations in the western U.S.; he also raced in northern Arizona and Utah before returning to Idaho as a teenager. Following graduation from Eagle High School in 2003, Fisher spent a post-graduate year at the Rowmark ski academy in Salt Lake City, and was named to the national developmental team in 2004. He was the bronze medalist in the downhill at the 2005 Junior World Championships in Bardonecchia, Italy.

Fisher made his World Cup debut in November 2005 in a downhill at Lake Louise, Alberta, and finished 44th. An ACL injury in November 2007 kept him out of the rest of the 2008 season. He returned the following season in 2009 and had his best results with a seventh at Val Gardena, Italy, and an 11th at the famed Hahnenkamm downhill race in Kitzbühel, Austria.

Fisher qualified for the U.S. team for the 2010 Winter Olympics in late 2009, but did not race in February due to a broken hand.

Fisher is a member of the Church of Jesus Christ of Latter-day Saints.

== World Cup top twenty finishes ==
Season	Date	Location	Discipline	Place
2009	19 Dec 2008	Val Gardena, Italy	Super G	20th
2009	20 Dec 2008	Val Gardena, Italy	Downhill	7th
2009	24 Jan 2009	Kitzbühel, Austria	Downhill	11th
2010	18 Dec 2009	Val Gardena, Italy	Downhill	19th
2010	23 Jan 2010	Kitzbühel, Austria	Downhill	18th
2012	3 Feb 2012	Chamonix, France	Downhill	12th
2012	4 Feb 2012	Chamonix, France	Downhill	12th
2014	21 Dec 2013	Val Gardena, Italy	Downhill	13th
