= Sverre Engen =

Norwegian-American alpine skier (1911–2001)

Sverre S. Engen (January 28, 1911 – April 4, 2001) was a Norwegian-American skier, ski coach, ski area manager, and film-maker.

== Biography ==
Engen was born in the town of Mjøndalen, in Buskerud county, Norway, the second son of Trond Sorli Engen and Martha Maranda Oen Engen. He had two brothers, Alf Engen (1909–1997) and Corey Engen (1916–2006), both of whom helped expand the sport of skiing in the intermountain U.S. Being the second son of a famous skiing father, Engen was naturally reared to ski. After his father died of the Spanish flu in 1918, his mother and brothers moved the short distance to small town Steinberg. At age 18, Sverre and older brother Alf (age 20) emigrated to the United States in 1929, first settling in Chicago, then relocating to Salt Lake City, Utah in 1931. Their widowed mother Martha and younger brother Corey (age 17) emigrated in 1933, joining Alf and Sverre in Utah.

Sverre Engen brought credit to Utah as a national ski jumping champion, ski resort operator and consultant, student of avalanche control, and as a pioneer of ski patrol work. His exploits include serving as Alta ski school director and as the first manager of the then-new Rustler Lodge at Alta, after being the first snow ranger at the resort in 1940. He helped build ski jumps named Ecker Hill, Parleys Canyon; Becker Hill, Ogden Canyon; and Landes Hill at Alta. Alta's Rustler Lodge was built by Sverre Engen and Howard Stillwell; opened in 1947, it was constructed on the site where the Alta General Store once stood.

Sverre was inducted into the National Ski Hall of Fame in 1971 for his "tremendous contribution to the growth of the sport of skiing." Among his credits is that of being coach of the University of Utah ski team when it won its first national collegiate championship in 1947. He also produced a series of skiing related films.

The Engen brothers helped to popularize skiing in the West, primarily in Utah and Idaho. All three are enshrined in multiple halls of fame, such as the National Ski Hall of Fame in Ishpeming. Sverre Engen died in 2001 at the age of 90. His older brother Alf died at age 88 in 1997, and younger brother Corey died in 2006 at age 90.

== Films ==
- Ski Aces (1944)
- Margie of the Wasatch
- Champs at Play
- Dancing Skis (1956)
- Ski Fever (1958)
- Skiing Unlimited
- The Snow Ranger
- Skiing, Their Way of Life (1957)
- Skiing America
- Ski Time USA (1959)
- Ski Spectacular (1962)
