= Powder skiing =

Skiing on ungroomed trails

Powder skiing is a recreational activity that involves skiing ungroomed trails located inside of avalanche control or ski patrol boundaries.

== History ==
In the Rocky Mountain Range of the Western United States, powder skiing is a common term used among expert skiers. Alf Engen, an early contributor to constructing 27 ski resorts in the Rocky Mountain Range, is regarded as the pioneer of powder skiing. The skiing public at Alta Ski Resort first started in the 1940s. Powder skiing and general skiing techniques, such as the Alberg technique, can be categorized by the fall line.

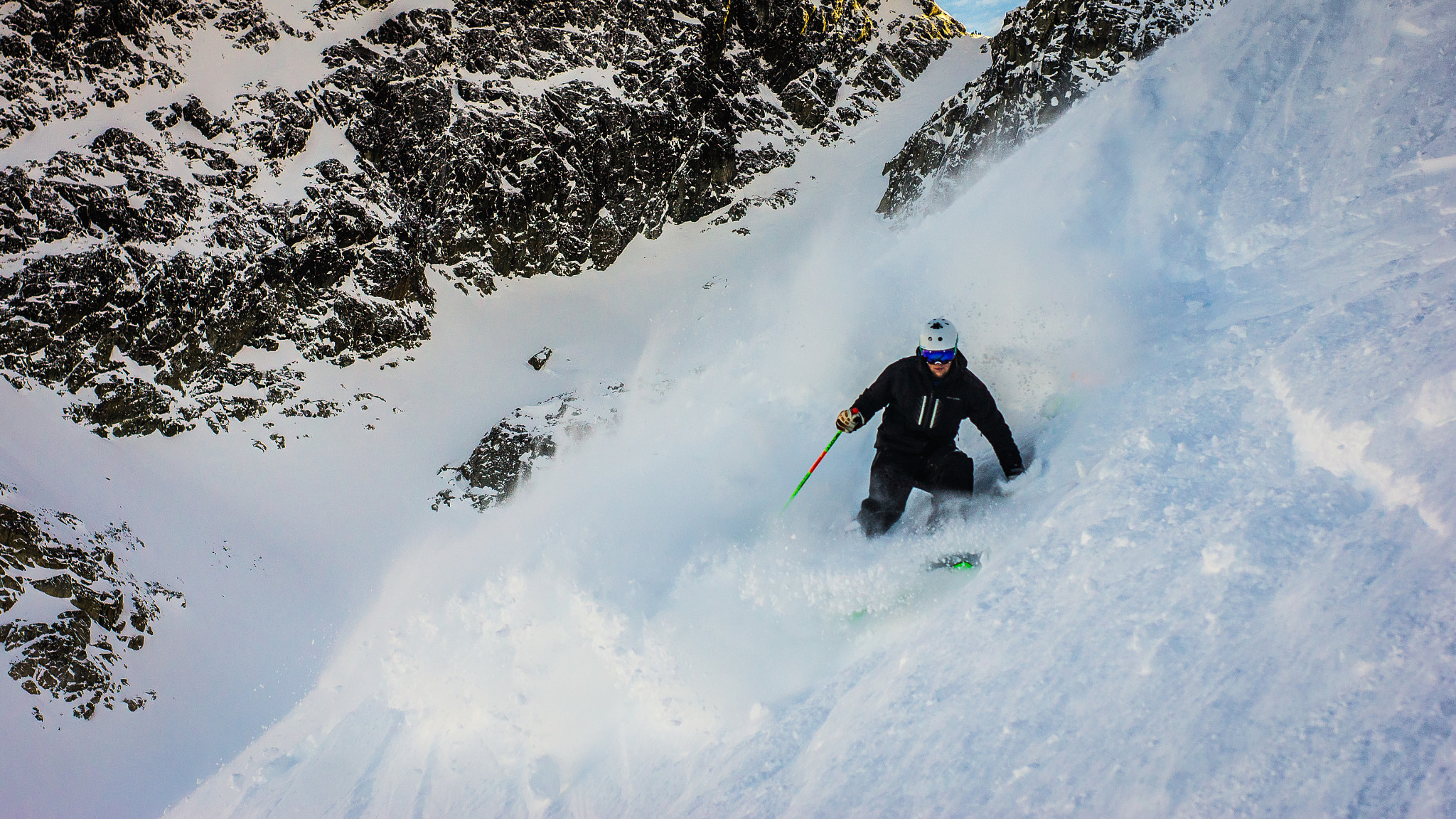
Calum Mathews charges in the Blackcomb alpine

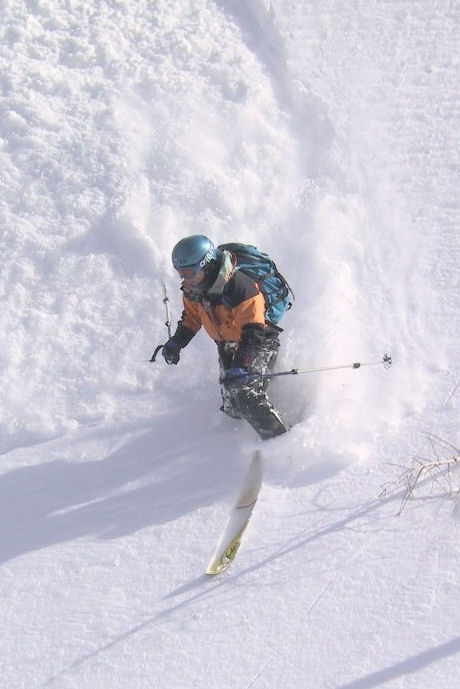
Linda Peer telemark skiing in powder

== Technique ==
The powder skiing technique is a broad term with a wide range of sub-techniques. Powder skiing requires having equal balance from side to side to stay upright.

=== Alpine ===
Alpine skiing techniques, used on groomed trails, can be modified for skiing in powder snow by lifting skis to create "float." Accepted good forms include having knees bent and leaning backward into the ski boots.

While turning, the thigh and hip areas of a powder skier's legs act as shock absorbers. Each shock-absorbing turn in powder creates a rebound by pushing on the snow to slow down and releasing that force to speed up. This type of momentum control is the opposite of wide turns and cutting into the snow. Turning the skis in powder decreases speed and is also an opportunity to change the direction that the skis are pointing down the mountain.

=== Tip and Turn ===
Using the Tip and Turn technique, one is less likely to get injured. Begin by bouncing rhythmically in the snow while maintaining a straight trajectory. This bouncing causes one's leg muscles to flex and extend subconsciously. During the extension phase, the skis are pushed into the snow while they rise to the surface during flexion. Then they turn by raising one foot and tilting it towards the outer edge of the ski while keeping one's legs pressed together, and they repeat the process.

Leaning back in powder to maintain momentum and bring ski tips to the surface in deep snow can lead to discomfort. Shaped skis with wide front ends make the skis rise to the surface so that the skier does not have to lean back.

=== Dipsy Doodle ===
The Dipsy Doodle is a technique that was developed in the late 1940s. The "Dipsy Doodle" involves following the fall line and lifting each ski one at a time repeatedly, thus establishing float. The Dipsy Doodle is a trick maneuver popularized years ago by U.S. Olympian Dick Durrance. It has become a Wedeln (tail-wagging) exercise for many skiers.

== Equipment ==
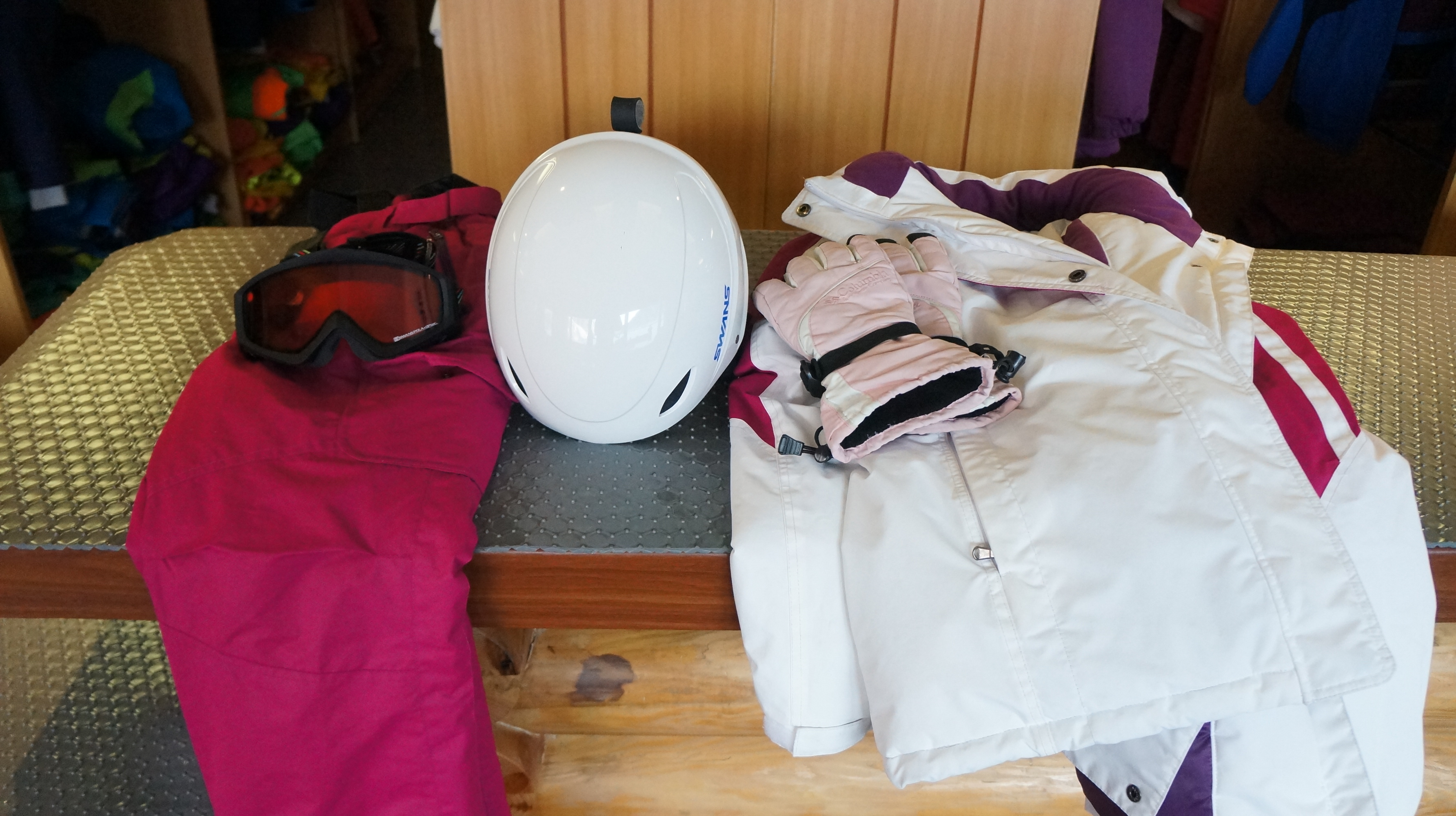
Ski clothes and gear

Modern powder ski construction is evolving with changes in optimal weight and durability. Powder skis use a design with wide tips and shorter tail lengths.

Powder skis typically feature wide tips, ranging from 140 to 155 millimeters. The tails are slightly more tapered, often within a 125- to 140-millimeter range. This design helps powder skis remain buoyant in snow. The contours and proportions of a ski's tip, waist, and tail can vary among models.
