= Corey Engen =

American cross-country skier

Corey Engen (March 30, 1916 – May 9, 2006) was the captain of the U.S. Nordic ski team at the 1948 Winter Olympics in St. Moritz, Switzerland. He was the youngest of the three Engen brothers that pioneered and popularized alpine skiing in the intermountain west, primarily in Utah and Idaho.

== Biography ==
Corey (born Kaare) was a ski jumper and cross-country skier in his native Norway. Engen was born in the town of Mjøndalen in Buskerud county, the third son of Trond and Martha Oen Engen. After his father died of the Spanish flu in 1918, his mother and brothers moved the short distance to small town Steinberg. His older brothers Alf (age 20) and Sverre (age 18) emigrated to the U.S. in 1929, first settling in Chicago, then relocating to Salt Lake City, Utah in 1931. Corey (age 17) and his widowed mother Martha emigrated in March 1933, joining brothers Alf and Sverre in Utah.

Corey Engen was one of the first ski instructors at Sun Valley, Idaho, and later moved to McCall, Idaho, first teaching at the Little Ski Hill, then known as the "Payette Lakes Ski Area." In the late 1940s, Engen had initiated the ski school at Snowbasin, near Ogden, Utah, and also coached the Weber State College ski team. In 1951 he returned to McCall, and ten years later was instrumental in the development of the new Brundage Mountain ski area, managing it until 1970.

Corey won more than 500 medals and trophies in all skiing disciplines (jumping, cross-country, downhill, slalom, and giant slalom). He was captain of the 1948 U.S. Olympic ski jumping team and got a Bronze medal in the jumping portion of the Olympic classic combined event, involving both jumping and cross-country. He was the recipient of 22 gold medals in national competitions. He was inducted into the U.S. National Ski Hall of Fame in 1973.

A resident of McCall for over 50 years, Engen and his wife Norma moved to Lindon, Utah in 1995, due to her declining health. After her death in December 2002, Engen moved to Provo. Corey Engen died in Orem at the age of 90, his death attributed to complications from pneumonia.

He was survived by two children, eight grandchildren and 15 great-grandchildren. He is buried in the Larkin Sunset Gardens Cemetery in Sandy, Utah. Engen was an active member of the Church of Jesus Christ of Latter-day Saints.
