= Alta, Utah =

- Town
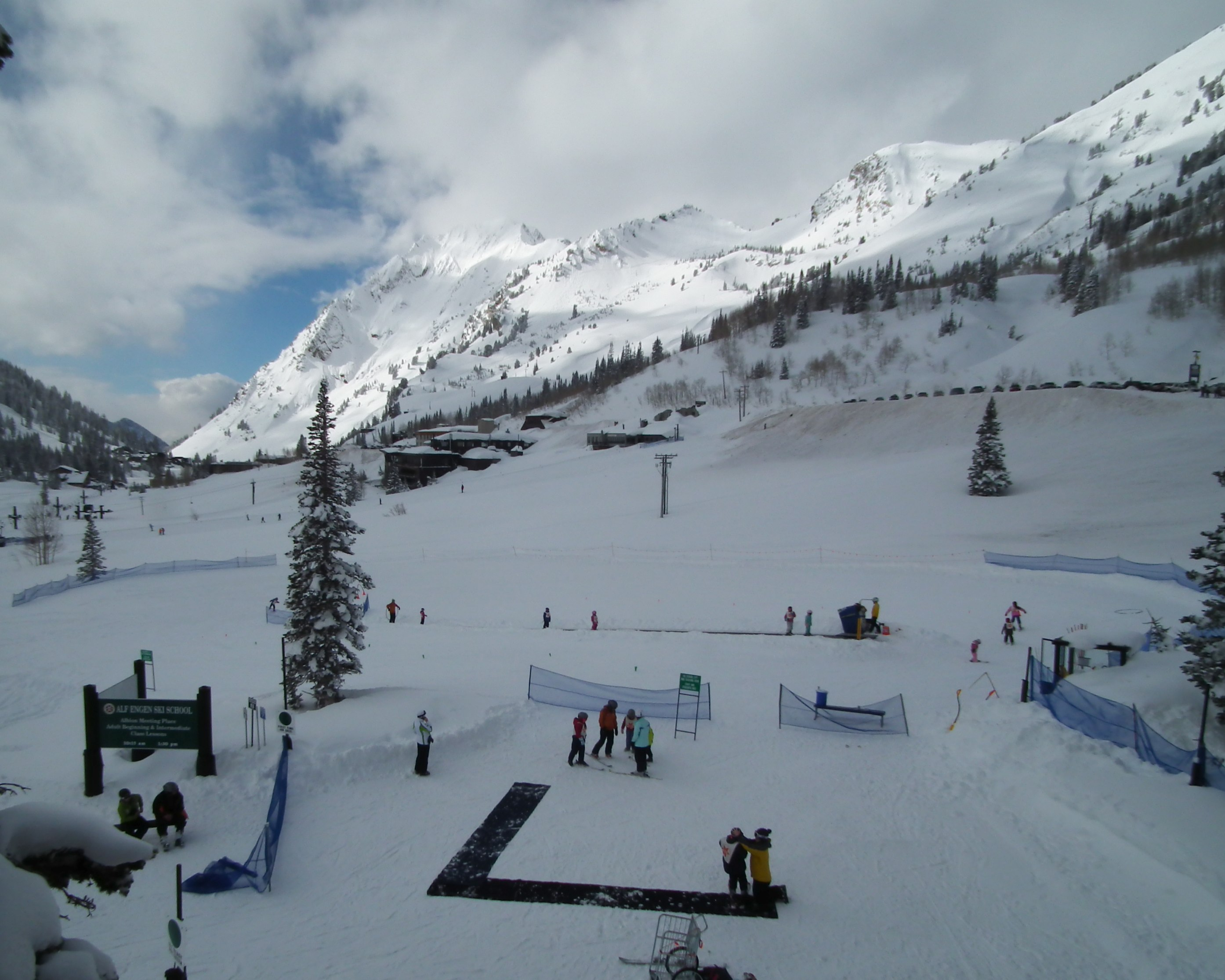
- Alta Ski Area, February 2011

- Flag

- Location in Salt Lake County and the state of Utah.

- Location of Utah in the United States
- Coordinates: 40°34′51″N 111°38′14″W
- United States: United States
- State: Utah
- County: Salt Lake
- Settled: 1865
- Incorporated: 1970
- Named for: The historic silver mining camp and ghost town of Alta

Government
  - Type: Mayor/Council
  - Mayor: Roger Bourke (2021)

Area
  - Total: 4.08 sq mi (10.6 km^{2})
  - Land: 4.1 sq mi (11 km^{2})
  - Water: 0.01 sq mi (0.026 km^{2})
- Elevation: 8,530 ft (2,600 m)

Population (2020)
  - Total: 278
  - Density: 68/sq mi (26/km^{2})
- Time zone: UTC-7 (MST)
  - Summer (DST): UTC-6 (MDT)
- ZIP code: 84092
- Area codes: 385, 801
- FIPS code: 49-00650
- GNIS feature ID: 1437483
- Website: townofalta.utah.gov

Alta is a town in eastern Salt Lake County, Utah, United States. It is part of the Salt Lake City, Utah Metropolitan Statistical Area. The population was 228 at the 2020 census, a large decrease from the 2010 figure of 383.

Alta is centered in the Alta Ski Area, a ski resort that has approximately 500,000 annual visitors. It is known for its powder skiing and its decision to not allow snowboarding.

== History ==
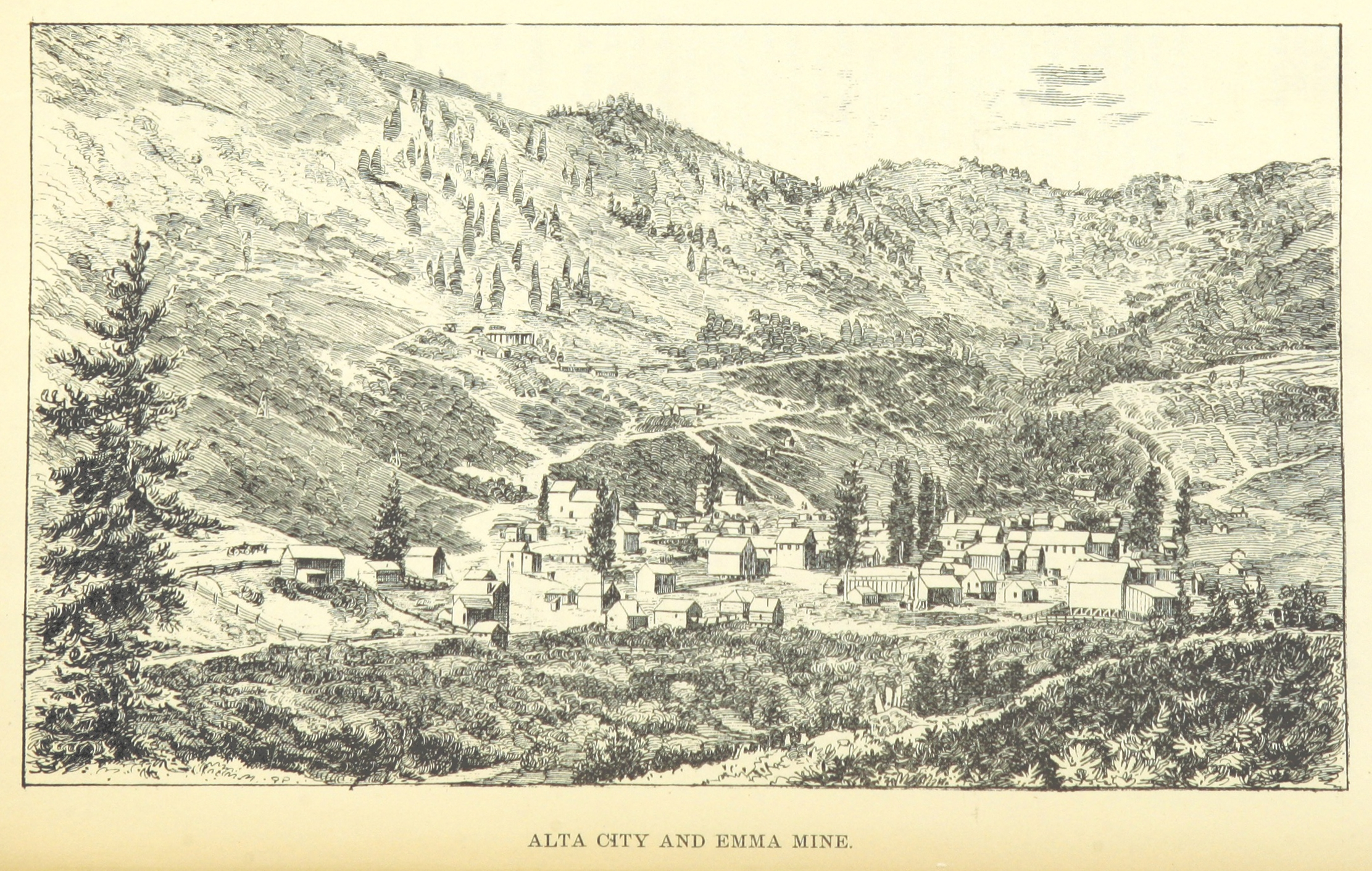
The Emma Silver Mine and the City (c.1875)

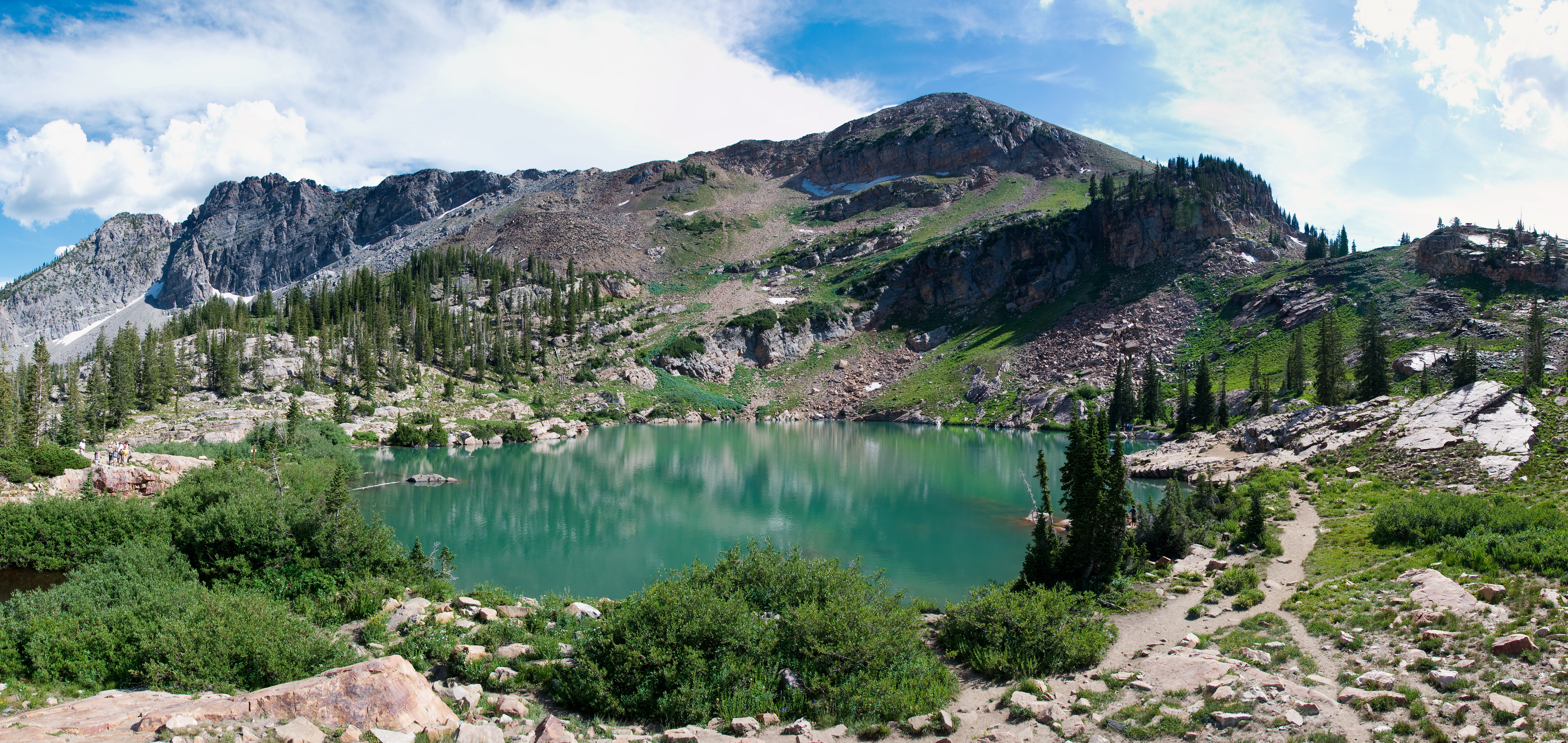
Cecret Lake near Alta

Alta has been important to the development of skiing in Utah. Alta was founded in 1865 to house miners from the Emma mine, the Flagstaff mine, and other silver mines in Little Cottonwood Canyon. Sensationally rich silver ore in the Emma mine enabled its owners to sell the mine at an inflated price to British investors in 1871. The subsequent exhaustion of the Emma ore body led to the recall of the American ambassador to Great Britain, who was a director of the company, and to Congressional hearings in Washington DC on the transaction.

An alleged incident that occurred in the town in 1873 was adapted by Rod Serling for the episode entitled "Mr. Garrity and the Graves" of his television series The Twilight Zone. The legend was also used as the basis for an episode of Death Valley Days, entitled “Miracle at Boot Hill” (S10 E10).

An 1878 fire and an 1885 avalanche destroyed most of the original mining town, though some mining activity persisted into the 20th century. By the 1930s, only one resident, George Watson, remained in the town. Facing back taxes on mining claims that he owned, Watson donated much of his land in Alta to the U.S. Forest Service, stipulating that the land be used to construct a ski area. In 1935, Norwegian skiing legend Alf Engen was hired to help develop the area, and Alta opened its first ski lift in 1938. By the end of the twentieth century, up to 7,000 people per day could be found on the Alta slopes, and traffic in the Little Cottonwood Canyon was nearing gridlock proportions.

Today, Alta is a small town centered around the Alta Ski Area.

During the COVID-19 pandemic and subsequent government-mandated economic restrictions, Alta briefly gained national attention when it was the only ski resort included in a detailed study of disease-transmission probabilities. The university-based study concluded that buses to the site could be made safe, traveling on ski lifts was safe, and queueing at ski lifts was safe. However, no amount of compensating factors could make indoor-dining at restaurants acceptably safe, and locker rooms could only be considered safe if occupants used "quiet voices".

== Geography ==
According to the United States Census Bureau, the town has a total area of 4.1 square miles (10.5 km^{2}), of which 0.25% is water.

At 8,950 feet (2,730 m), Alta is one of the highest cities in Utah and one of the highest in America.

== Demographics ==
Historical population
Census	Pop.	Note	%±
1970	93		—
1980	381		309.7%
1990	397		4.2%
2000	370		−6.8%
2010	383		3.5%
2020	228		−40.5%
US Decennial Census

As of the 2010 United States census, there were 386 people in 156 households in the town. The racial makeup of the town was 93 percent white and 4 percent Hispanic or Latino.

The population was 67 percent male and 33 percent female. The population was 4.7 percent under the age of 18, and 2.6 percent was 65 or older.

== Climate ==
Alta experiences a high altitude humid continental climate (Köppen Dfb), which borders on a subalpine climate (Dfc), due to its high elevation. Due to its proximity to the Great Salt Lake, the town receives very heavy snows, averaging over 507 inches (12.9 m) per year. During the very wet season of 1982/1983, Alta received as much as 900 inches (23 m) of snow, leading to record flooding of Wasatch streams as the snow melted during May and June that year. Alta's total precipitation of 108.54 inches (2,756.9 mm) during 1983 is a record for a calendar year in any state of the Mountain West.

Climate data for Alta, Utah, 1991–2020 normals, extremes 1906–present
Month	Jan	Feb	Mar	Apr	May	Jun	Jul	Aug	Sep	Oct	Nov	Dec	Year
Record high °F (°C)	59 (15)	58 (14)	65 (18)	69 (21)	76 (24)	82 (28)	94 (34)	84 (29)	86 (30)	85 (29)	64 (18)	59 (15)	94 (34)
Mean maximum °F (°C)	47.8 (8.8)	46.5 (8.1)	52.6 (11.4)	58.3 (14.6)	67.6 (19.8)	75.8 (24.3)	80.5 (26.9)	78.6 (25.9)	73.9 (23.3)	65.3 (18.5)	54.7 (12.6)	46.9 (8.3)	81.0 (27.2)
Mean daily maximum °F (°C)	30.7 (−0.7)	30.7 (−0.7)	36.8 (2.7)	42.3 (5.7)	52.6 (11.4)	64.4 (18.0)	72.9 (22.7)	71.3 (21.8)	62.2 (16.8)	49.5 (9.7)	37.4 (3.0)	30.2 (−1.0)	48.4 (9.1)
Daily mean °F (°C)	22.9 (−5.1)	23.0 (−5.0)	28.5 (−1.9)	33.6 (0.9)	43.0 (6.1)	53.3 (11.8)	61.6 (16.4)	60.2 (15.7)	51.7 (10.9)	40.3 (4.6)	29.1 (−1.6)	22.3 (−5.4)	39.1 (4.0)
Mean daily minimum °F (°C)	15.0 (−9.4)	15.4 (−9.2)	20.2 (−6.6)	24.8 (−4.0)	33.4 (0.8)	42.2 (5.7)	50.3 (10.2)	49.1 (9.5)	41.1 (5.1)	31.0 (−0.6)	20.7 (−6.3)	14.5 (−9.7)	29.8 (−1.2)
Mean minimum °F (°C)	−3.1 (−19.5)	−1.5 (−18.6)	3.3 (−15.9)	9.1 (−12.7)	18.2 (−7.7)	28.3 (−2.1)	39.5 (4.2)	38.6 (3.7)	25.3 (−3.7)	13.6 (−10.2)	1.0 (−17.2)	−3.7 (−19.8)	−7.2 (−21.8)
Record low °F (°C)	−26 (−32)	−19 (−28)	−8 (−22)	1 (−17)	10 (−12)	20 (−7)	31 (−1)	30 (−1)	16 (−9)	−4 (−20)	−16 (−27)	−25 (−32)	−26 (−32)
Average precipitation inches (mm)	6.37 (162)	5.40 (137)	6.17 (157)	4.78 (121)	3.47 (88)	1.96 (50)	1.48 (38)	2.07 (53)	2.58 (66)	3.50 (89)	4.17 (106)	5.13 (130)	47.08 (1,197)
Average snowfall inches (cm)	74.7 (190)	81.2 (206)	71.4 (181)	50.0 (127)	15.9 (40)	4.4 (11)	0.0 (0.0)	0.0 (0.0)	2.6 (6.6)	24.4 (62)	53.9 (137)	79.8 (203)	458.3 (1,163.6)
Average extreme snow depth inches (cm)	87.3 (222)	101.6 (258)	107.5 (273)	99.6 (253)	66.7 (169)	17.8 (45)	0.7 (1.8)	0.0 (0.0)	2.7 (6.9)	15.3 (39)	36.4 (92)	60.6 (154)	115.3 (293)
Average precipitation days (≥ 0.01 in)	14.1	13.9	13.0	11.9	10.7	6.2	6.9	8.6	8.5	9.6	11.2	14.7	129.3
Average snowy days (≥ 0.1 in)	13.6	13.1	12.2	10.0	4.9	1.3	0.0	0.0	0.8	5.1	9.7	14.0	84.7
Source 1: NOAA
Source 2: National Weather Service

== See also ==
- List of cities and towns in Utah
- Twister (tree) – located near Alta
