= Alf Engen =

Norwegian-American skier

- Born: Alf Marinius Engen; May 15, 1909; Mjøndalen, Nedre Eiker, Buskerud county, Norway
- Died: July 20, 1997 (aged 88); Salt Lake City, Utah, US
- Resting place: Centerville City Cemetery, Centerville, Utah
- Monuments: Alf Engen Ski Museum
- Occupations: Skier and ski school teacher/owner
- Known for: skiing pioneer in U.S.
- Spouse(s): Evelyn Pack Engen (1917–2010) (m. 1937–1997, his death)
- Children: 2

Alf Marinius Engen (May 15, 1909–July 20, 1997) was a Norwegian-American skier. He set several ski jumping world records during the 1930s and helped establish numerous ski areas in the Western United States. Engen is best known for his ski school at Alta in Utah and as the pioneer of powder skiing.

== Background ==
Born in Norway in the town of Mjøndalen, in Nedre Eiker municipality in Buskerud county, Engen was the first son of Trond and Martha Oen Engen. His two younger brothers, Sverre (1911–2001) and Corey (1916–2006), were also accomplished skiers. As the first-born son of a famous skiing father, Engen was naturally reared to ski.

After his father died of the Spanish flu in 1918 when he was nine, Engen's mother moved the family the short distance to the small town of Steinberg. In 1929 at age twenty, Alf and his brother Sverre (age 18) emigrated to the United States, first settling in Chicago, then relocating west to Utah in 1931 at Salt Lake City. Their widowed mother Martha and younger brother Corey (age 17) joined them in 1933.

== Career ==
Engen quickly gained a reputation for his world class skiing skills. Although primarily a ski jumper when he arrived in the U.S., he quickly mastered alpine skiing and is credited for developing the technique of powder skiing, honed at the Alta Ski Area. The following years he won numerous American and international titles. In 1940, Engen finished first in the National Four-way, held east of Seattle, Washington. Engen was also the recipient of numerous awards including the All-American Ski Trophy, 1937, Americanism Award in 1940, Helm's Hall of Fame Award in 1954; and Skier's Hall of Fame Award in 1956.

He helped establish the ski school at Alta, and assisted in the creation of thirty other ski resorts in the western United States. The three Engen brothers helped to popularize skiing in the West, primarily in Utah and Idaho. Alf's son Alan carries on the family tradition at Alta. Alf Engen died in Salt Lake City in 1997, at the age of 88; his two younger brothers both lived to the age of 90.

== Alf Engen Ski Museum ==
The Alf Engen Ski Museum is located in the Joe Quinney Winter Sports Center at Utah Olympic Park, 4 miles (6.4 km) north of Park City. It contains more than 300 trophies, medals, uniforms, scrapbooks, skis, boots, photos, films, and other collectables that span some 70 years in the career of the Engen family. The museum's educational component provides teacher lesson ideas and field trip stations for 4th grade students, updated in August 2024 to reflect the Utah Core Standards in Mathematics, Science with Engineering Education, English/Language Arts, and Social Studies.

The Museum includes a Mountain Sports Simulator ride and the Take Flight virtual ski jump experience designed and built by Utah-based company Unrivaled. The ride takes visitors mountain biking through Deer Valley in the autumn, speedflying (paragliding with skis) from the top of Mount Superior landing near Snowbird Ski Resort, black diamond alpine skiing through Alta Ski Resort, and racing down the Utah Olympic Park bobsled track in the winter. The Simulator gives the rider an authentic experience with blowing wind and falling snow features.

== Invalid ski jumping world record ==
Date	Hill	Location	Metres	Feet
January 1931	Ecker Hill	Salt Lake City, United States	75.3	247
January 1931	Ecker Hill	Salt Lake City, United States	77.4	254
1931	Ecker Hill	Salt Lake City, United States	81.1	266
1935	Ecker Hill	Salt Lake City, United States	94.8	311

Not recognized! He stood at WR, but this record never made it to WR official books.
Not recognized! He stood at WR, but Utah SC wasn't member of Western American Winter Sport Ass..
Not recognized! He stood at world record distance, but set at unofficial competition.
Not recognized! He stood at world record distance, but at practice session.

== Video ==
- Vimeo.com – Alf Engen - The Old Man Of The Mountain - Powder segment
