= Steinberg, Norway =

Village in Drammen Municipality, Norway

Coordinates: 59°46′00″N 9°57′00″E

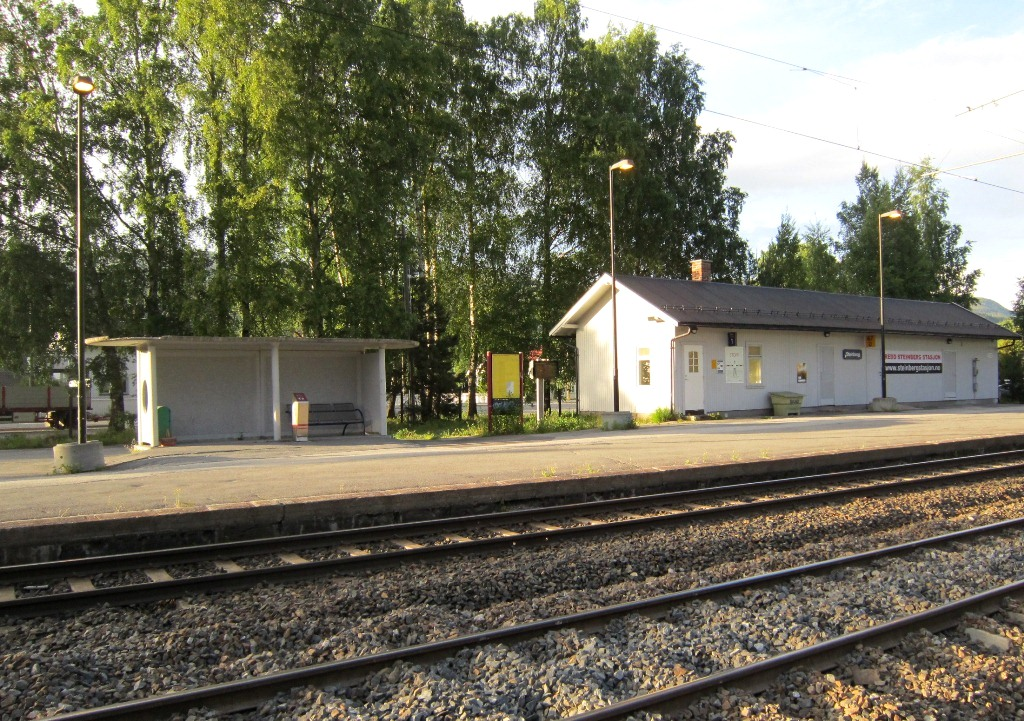
Steinberg station on the Sørlandet Line

Steinberg is a small village in Drammen municipality in Buskerud county, Norway.

The village lies next to the municipal centre and town of Mjøndalen separated by E134 highway. The village is situated next to the Drammenselva river stretching west towards the village of Loesmoen in the neighbouring municipality of Øvre Eiker. A riverside park lies along the river. The community has both an elementary school and kindergarten, a number of businesses, an art gallery, and a sports club. High school and other students have to commute to other larger community centres in the surrounding municipalities of Nedre Eiker, Øvre Eiker or Drammen. Steinberg is principally a residential area with most of the active work force commutes by car or train to larger cities in the region such as Drammen and Oslo.

The community has championed the continued survival of Steinberg Station on the Sørlandet Line (Sørlandsbanen). The station was closed for three years from December 2012 but opened once again in September 2015, much in part thanks to the "activist group for the preservation of Steinberg Train Station. Steinberg train station has been renovated for ca 30 million NOK and meets now the standards for modern trains. The national railways have wished to eliminate the Steinberg stop but have thus far been unsuccessful.

Originally the rural community was called Stemberlandet, and later changed to Steinberg possibly due to a national railway standardization of placenames. Stemberlandet "the sorting land" referred to the fact that the logging industry sorted the timber in different stations along the Drammenselva river. Authorities concluded that Stemberlandet was not a real village name, and was thus changed to Steinberg.
