= Alta Ski Area =

Ski resort in Alta, Utah, United States

- Location in Utah Alta Ski Area (the United States)
- Location: Alta, Utah, U.S.
- Nearest city: Sandy, Utah, U.S.
- Coordinates: 40°34′51″N 111°38′14″W
- Status: Active
- Vertical: 2,538 ft (774 m)
- Top elevation: 11,068 ft (3,374 m)
- Base elevation: 8,530 ft (2,600 m)
- Skiable area: 2,614 acres (10.58 km^{2})
- Trails: 116+ total 15% easiest 30% more difficult 55% most difficult
- Lift system: 7 chairlifts 1 high speed six pack 3 high speed quads 1 fixed grip quad 1 triple 1 double 5 surface tows.
- Terrain parks: 0
- Snowfall: 545 in (45.4 ft; 13.8 m)
- Snowmaking: yes
- Night skiing: none
- Website: alta.com

Alta is a ski area in the western United States, located in the town of Alta in the Wasatch Mountains of Utah, in Salt Lake County. With a skiable area of 2,614 acres (10.58 km^{2}), Alta's base elevation is 8,530 ft (2,600 m) and rises to 11,068 ft (3,374 m) for a vertical gain of 2,538 ft (774 m). One of the oldest ski resorts in the country, it opened its first lift on January 15, 1939. Alta is known for receiving more snow than most Utah resorts, with an average annual snowfall of 543 inches (13.8 m). It is also regularly ranked as having the best snow in North America.

Alta is one of the oldest ski areas in the U.S. and is one of just three ski areas in the U.S. that prohibit snowboarders. Located at the head of Little Cottonwood Canyon in Albion Basin and Collins Gulch, barely 30 miles (48 km) from the Great Salt Lake, Alta resides in a unique micro climate characterized by over 543 inches (1,380 cm) of high volume, low moisture snowfall annually.

Alta Ski Area features long, straight, fall-line pitches. Among the most well known are Alf's High Rustler, Eddie's High Nowhere, Stone Crusher and the Baldy Chutes. Though widely respected as one of the most challenging in-bounds ski areas in the world, Alta has always viewed itself as a local's and family oriented ski area.

Alta is one of three remaining ski resorts in the U.S. that prohibit snowboarders, along with nearby competitor Deer Valley and Vermont's Mad River Glen.

== History ==
=== Mining era history ===
The community of Alta was established in 1871 as an offshoot of the silver mining operations in Little Cottonwood Canyon. A fire destroyed most of the town in 1878, then a cataclysmic avalanche in 1885—combined with the decline of mining—heralded a period of dormancy for the town. The area experienced a modest resurgence in mining in the 1900s, but the town declined again shortly thereafter, and was deserted with the exception of a few hardy miners who continued to intermittently prospect the area.

In 1935 the U.S. Forest Service retained the noted skier Alf Engen to hike into the area and determine its potential as a future ski area. Engen's reports expressed great promise for the area, and recommended the purchase of additional surrounding lands to form the ski area. In 1937 a prominent Salt Lake City lawyer, Joe Quinney, along with other local businessmen, formed the Utah Winter Sports Association to oversee the development of skiing at Alta. In the following year construction began on the original Collins chairlift, fashioned from a surplus mining ore tramway system that featured a clamp-cam bullwheel gripping a metal cable strung with single-seat chairs. It was the second such chairlift in the United States, after Sun Valley.

=== Ski area history ===
Alta Ski Area opened to skiers for the first time in 1939 on January 15, offering a single ride on the chair for 25 cents.

A veteran of the elite 10th Mountain Division, Monty Atwater took over Sverre Engen's (Alf's brother) role as Snow Ranger for the Forest Service in 1946. Within a couple of seasons, Atwater began using hand charges and artillery to trigger avalanches in and around Alta Ski Area. In 1952, Atwater received permission to fire a World War I-era 75mm Howitzer for avalanche control work.

Alta installed its first triple in 1991, by upgrading the Germania double chair. The resort began adding a developed snowmaking infrastructure in 1996, and the ski area continues to develop and refine the process. The late 1990s and early 2000s were marked by further modernization. In 1999 the Sunnyside lift was replaced with a detachable triple chair, the resort's first detachable chairlift. Two years later the Supreme chair was upgraded to a triple, and the Sugarloaf chair was replaced with a detachable quad. In the summer of 2004, the Collins double lift and Germania triple lifts were replaced with a single two-stage detachable quad going from the base of the former Collins lift to the top terminal of the former Germania lift. The mid-mountain Watson Shelter was rebuilt near the Collins Angle Station.

During the 2007–08 season, Alta introduced a new Axess RFID electronic lift ticket system, similar to that of the Solitude Ski Resort. During the 2008–09 season, Alta added a conveyor system at the start point of the Supreme lift that assists skiers in loading. Alta added safety bars to Sunnyside in 2010 and to Collins, Sugarloaf, and Supreme in the summer of 2011.

On January 15, 2014, a group called Wasatch Equality and four individual snowboarders filed a lawsuit in the United States District Court for the District of Utah against Alta Ski Area and the United States Forest Service, seeking to permanently disallow Alta from enforcing its anti-snowboarder policy and snowboarding ban. Alta Ski Area prevailed in the ruling and continues to exclusively serve skiers.

For the 2017–18 season, Leitner-Poma built a high speed quad that replaced the former Supreme and Cecret lifts, extending from Alf's Restaurant to the top terminal of the former Supreme lift, utilizing an eight-degree bend in the lift line. For the 2022–23 season, Leitner-Poma constructed the Sunnyside lift—a high speed six pack to replace the Sunnyside and Albion lifts.

Two new ski conveyors, Big Griz and Little Griz were constructed in the summer of 2024 and opened during the 2024–25 season. Supreme lift was realigned in the summer of 2025.

As of 2023, there are plans for development of the Albion Day Lodge to provide additional restaurant seating, storage, public restrooms, and employee housing.

== Climate ==
At 11,051 ft (3,368 m), Sugarloaf Mountain, is a high peak within the Alta Ski Area. Sugarloaf Mountain has a subalpine climate (Köppen Dfc), bordering on an alpine climate (Köppen ETH). There is no weather station at the summit, but this climate table contains interpolated data for an area around the summit.

Climate data for Sugarloaf Mountain (Alta) 40.5641 N, 111.6236 W, Elevation: 10,482 ft (3,195 m) (1991–2020 normals)
Month	Jan	Feb	Mar	Apr	May	Jun	Jul	Aug	Sep	Oct	Nov	Dec	Year
Mean daily maximum °F (°C)	26.1 (−3.3)	27.3 (−2.6)	32.2 (0.1)	38.1 (3.4)	47.5 (8.6)	59.0 (15.0)	68.3 (20.2)	66.6 (19.2)	57.8 (14.3)	44.8 (7.1)	33.3 (0.7)	26.4 (−3.1)	44.0 (6.6)
Daily mean °F (°C)	17.9 (−7.8)	18.1 (−7.7)	22.7 (−5.2)	27.8 (−2.3)	37.0 (2.8)	47.6 (8.7)	57.1 (13.9)	55.7 (13.2)	47.3 (8.5)	35.1 (1.7)	24.8 (−4.0)	18.1 (−7.7)	34.1 (1.2)
Mean daily minimum °F (°C)	9.8 (−12.3)	8.9 (−12.8)	13.3 (−10.4)	17.6 (−8.0)	26.4 (−3.1)	36.1 (2.3)	45.9 (7.7)	44.8 (7.1)	36.7 (2.6)	25.4 (−3.7)	16.2 (−8.8)	9.8 (−12.3)	24.2 (−4.3)
Average precipitation inches (mm)	7.05 (179)	6.03 (153)	6.09 (155)	5.91 (150)	4.32 (110)	1.95 (50)	1.32 (34)	2.11 (54)	2.83 (72)	4.13 (105)	5.18 (132)	6.08 (154)	53 (1,348)
Source: PRISM Climate Group

== Ski area ==
The ski area is owned by multiple individuals, with the largest shares being held by the Laughlin family (51%), the Quinney family (25%), and the Bass family (11%). The hotels at the base are all independently owned and not a part of Alta.

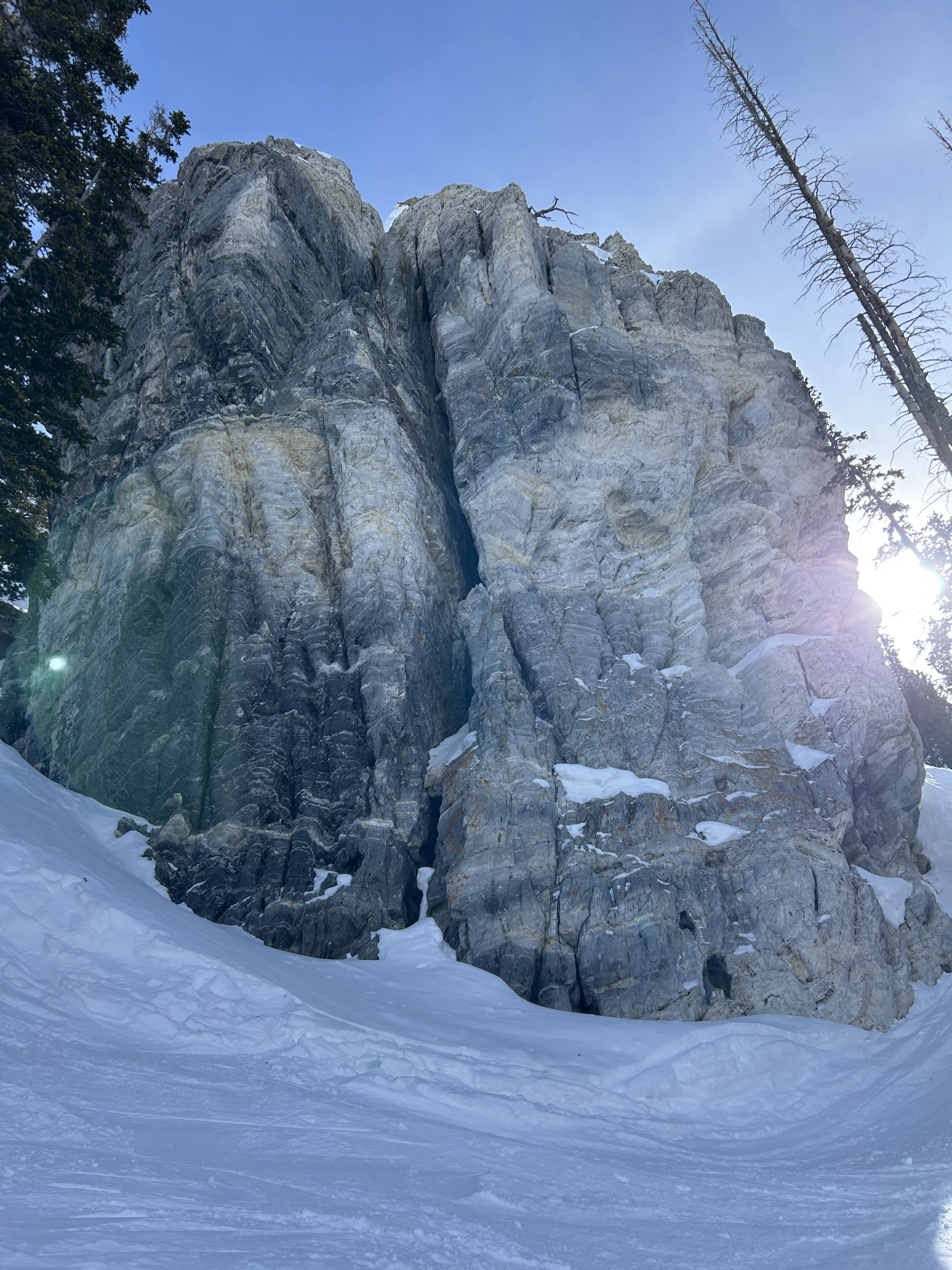
Elephant Rock in the Supreme Area

=== Partnership with Snowbird ===
Beginning in the winter of 2002, Alta and its neighbor, Snowbird, began offering a joint day pass and a joint season ticket, allowing skiers to fully access all of the terrain of both resorts. The offer coincided with the opening of a new lift in Mineral Basin, a large bowl owned by Snowbird on the back of Snowbird's Hidden Peak and Alta's Sugarloaf mountains, that allowed access to Alta. Other access points between the two resorts exist as well. (Due to Alta's skiers-only policy, the offer is not open to snowboarders.)

=== Lifts ===
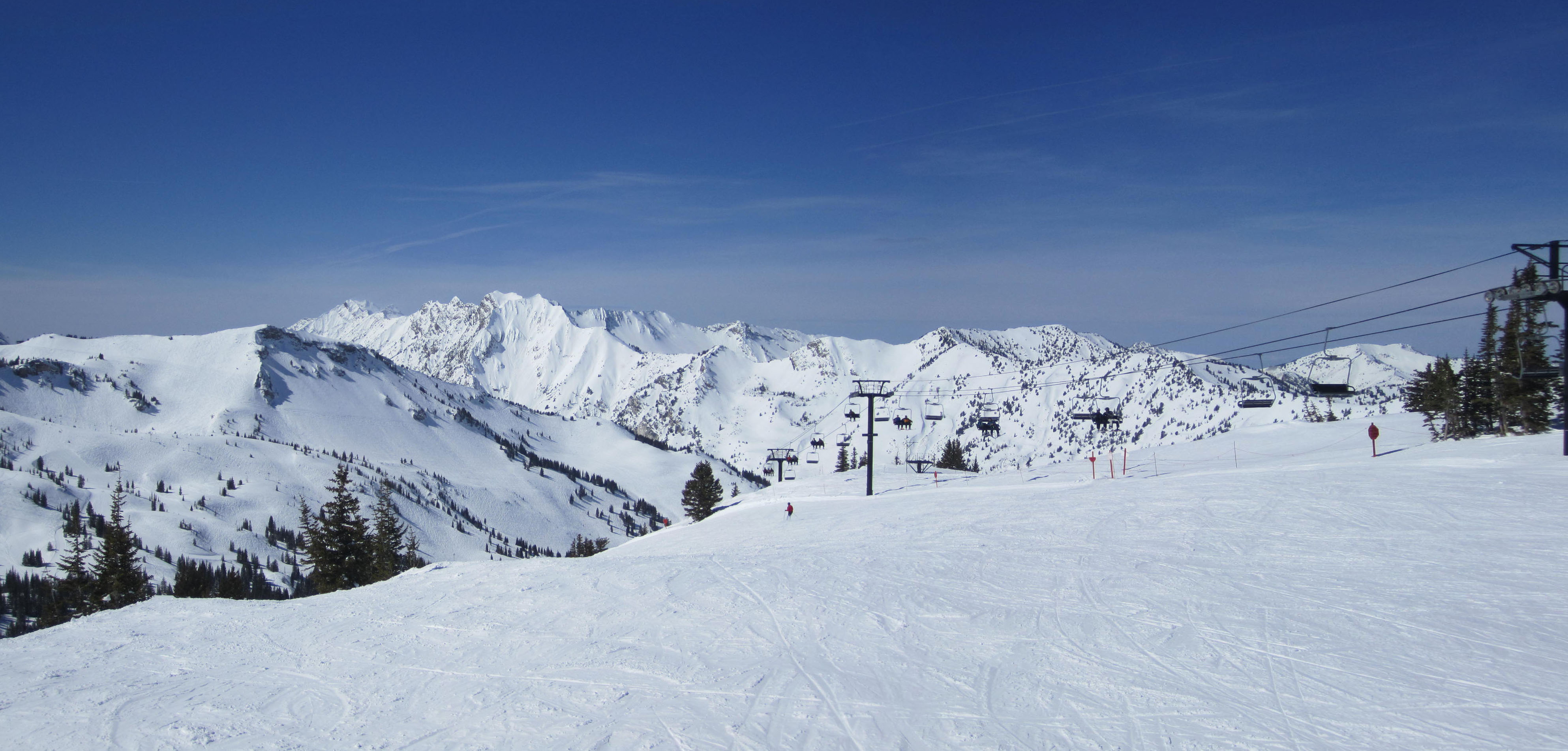
Summit of Point Supreme

Alta currently has five main lifts. Sunnyside, Supreme and Sugarloaf are located in Albion Basin. Two lifts—Collins and Wildcat—are located in Collins Gulch. The Transfer Tow transfers skiers between Wildcat and Albion base areas.

Additionally, there is a surface tow to the Alta Lodge and two lifts providing access to the Rustler Lodge and Snowpine Lodge.

Lift Name	Length	Vertical	Type	Make	Year Installed
Collins	6,296 ft	1,840 ft	High speed quad	Doppelmayr CTEC	2004
Sugarloaf	5,042 ft	1,371 ft	High speed quad	Garaventa CTEC	2001
Sunnyside	4,730 ft	810 ft	High speed six pack	Leitner-Poma	2022
Supreme	5,134 ft	1,224 ft	High speed quad	Leitner-Poma	2017
Wildcat	4,268 ft	1,226 ft	Double	Yan	1980
Transfer Tow	2,482 ft	108 ft	Rope Tow	Yan	1992
Rustler	475 ft	85 ft	Triple (for Rustler Lodge guests)	Garaventa CTEC	1999
Snowpine	487 ft	85 ft	Fixed grip quad (for Snowpine Lodge guests)	Skytrac	2018

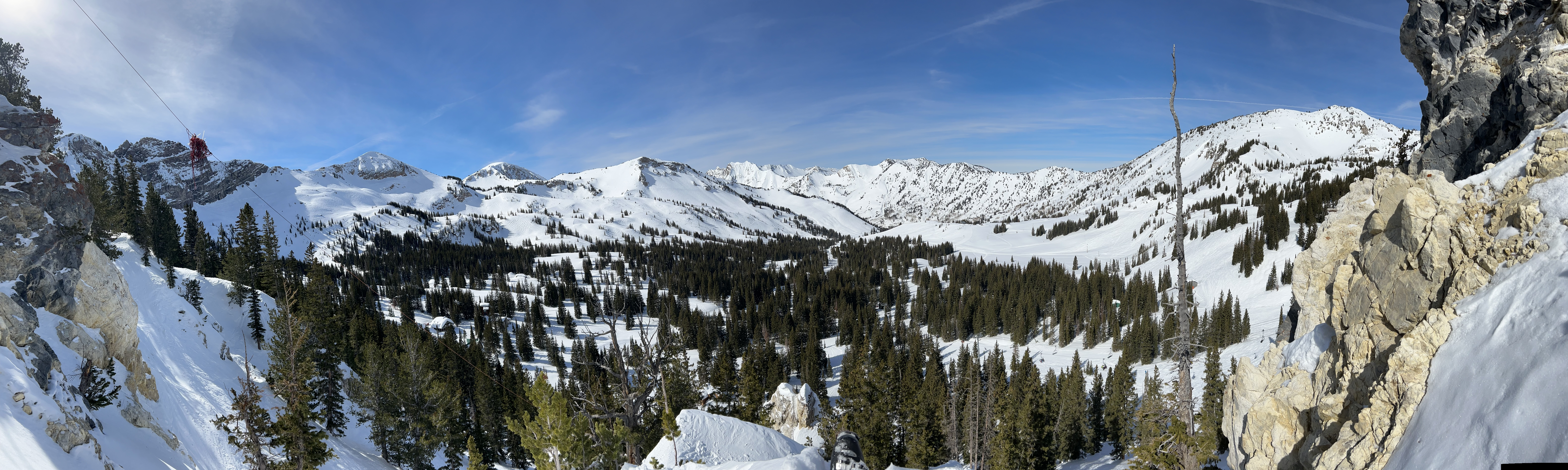
A view of Alta Ski Area from Supreme Area

=== Terrain aspects ===
- North: 53%
- East: 17%
- West: 29%
- South: 1%

== Sources ==
- Shrontz, Duane (1989) Alta: a people's story Alta Ski Lifts Corp OCLC 20835855
- Asmus, Brad (1993) Powder Hound's Guide to Skiing Alta ISBN 0-9631113-0-2
- Engen, Alan (1998) For the Love of Skiing: A Visual History ISBN 0879058676
