= Twin Peaks (disambiguation) =

Twin Peaks is an American television series which ran from 1990 to 1991 and in 2017.

Twin Peaks may also refer to:

== Entertainment ==
- Twin Peaks: Fire Walk with Me, a 1992 film prequel to the television series
- Twin Peaks: The Missing Pieces, a 2014 compilation of deleted and extended scenes from Twin Peaks: Fire Walk with Me
- Plays the Music of Twin Peaks, a 2016 album by Xiu Xiu, covering the series's soundtrack
- Twin Peaks (album), a 1974 album by hard rock band Mountain
- Twin Peaks (band), a Chicago-based rock band
- "Twin Peaks", a song by the band Surfer Blood from their 2010 album Astro Coast

== Mountains ==
- Double summit, a type of mountain or hill with two summits

=== Canada ===
- Twin Peaks (British Columbia), two summits on Vancouver Island
- The Twins massif, North Twin Peak and South Twin Peak in the Canadian Rockies

=== United States ===
- Twin Peaks (Alaska), Chugach Mountains
- Twin Peaks (Oregon), in the Wallowa Mountains
- Twin Peaks (Wyoming), in the Wind River Range

==== California ====
- Twin Peaks (Placer County, California), near Lake Tahoe
- Twin Peaks (San Francisco), two high hills close to Midtown Terrace
- Twin Peaks (Santa Clara County, California), in the foothills west of Morgan Hill
- Twin Peaks (Sequoia National Park)
- Twin Peaks (Yosemite), in Yosemite National Park

==== Colorado ====
- Twin Peaks (Chaffee County, Colorado), in the Sawatch Range
- Twin Peaks (Ouray County, Colorado), in the Sneffels Range
- Twin Peaks (Sangre de Cristo), in Alamosa County
- Twin Sisters Peaks, in Larimer County
- Joint name of Longs Peak and Mount Meeker, in Rocky Mountain National Park

==== Nevada ====
- Twin Peaks (Churchill County, Nevada)
- Twin Peaks (Elko County, Nevada), twin mountain summits northwest of Elko, in the Adobe Range

==== Utah ====
- American Fork Twin Peaks, on the Alpine Ridge within the Wasatch Range
- Broads Fork Twin Peaks, on the Cottonwood Ridge within the Wasatch Range
- Avenues Twin Peaks, within the Wasatch Range foothills

=== Other mountains ===
- Twin Peaks (Antarctica)
- Two hills near the Mars Pathfinder landing site in Ares Vallis

== Other uses ==
- Twin Peaks, California, an unincorporated community in San Bernardino County, California
- Twin Peaks Tavern, historic LGBT bar in San Francisco, California
- Twin Peaks (restaurant chain), a chain based in Lewisville, Texas
- Twin Peaks, a chocolate bar similar to Toblerone sold by UK retailer Poundland
