= Adobe Range =

Mountain range in Nevada, United States

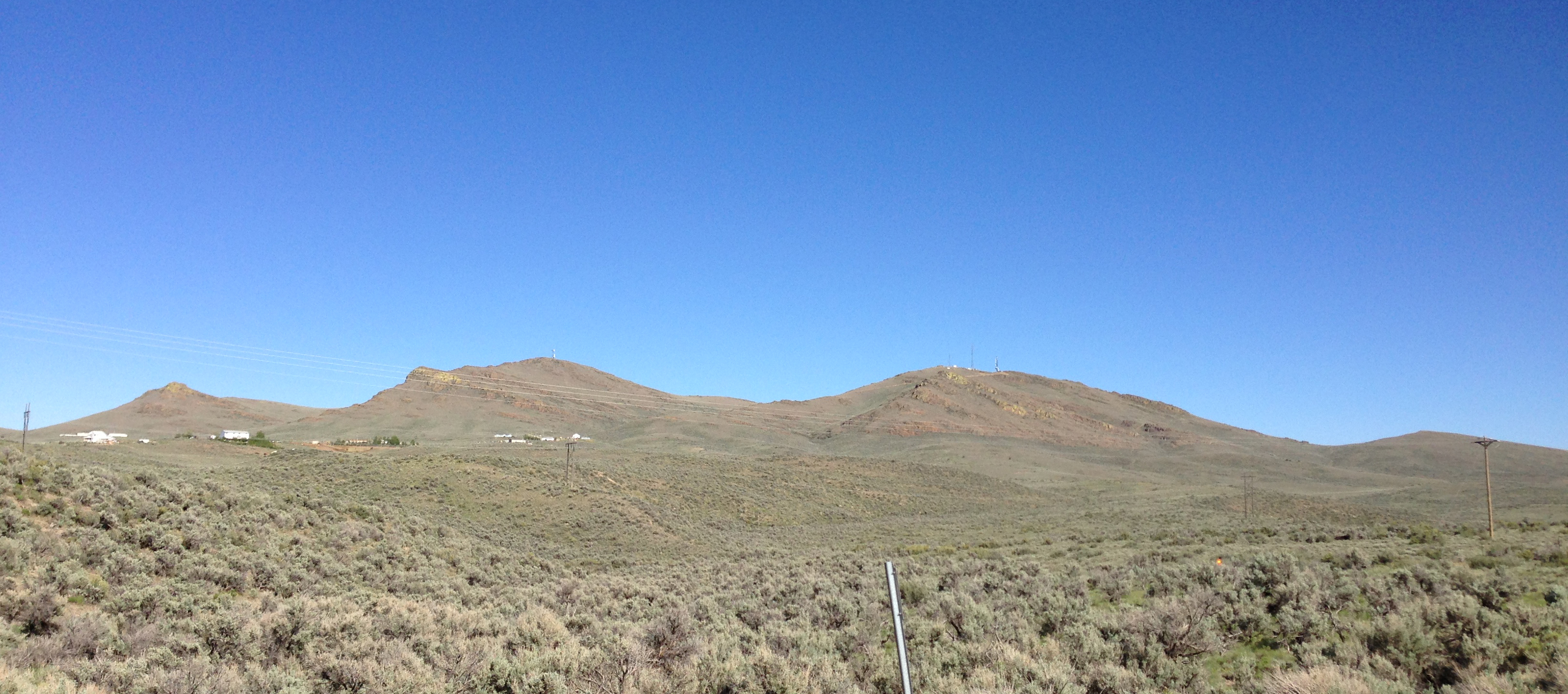
- Twin Peaks in the Adobe Range northwest of Elko, Nevada

Highest point
- Elevation: 2,479 m (8,133 ft)

Geography
- Location within Nevada
- Country: United States
- State: Nevada
- District: Elko County
- Range coordinates: 40°57′10.704″N 115°47′55.257″W
- Topo map: USGS Kittridge Springs

The Adobe Range is a minor mountain range of Nevada. Located northwest and north of Elko, Nevada, it runs generally north–south for about 80 miles (130 km), and has an area of about 314 square miles (813 km^{2}). Its highest point is an unnamed summit of 8,134 feet (2,479 m) and the named peaks include Sherman Peak (7,522 feet (2,293 m)), Twin Peaks (East and West, 7,475 feet (2,278 m) and 7,472 feet (2,277 m) respectively) and The Buttes (6,674 feet (2,034 m)).

The vegetation of the range is primarily sagebrush steppe. Various intermittent creeks feed the Humboldt River, which borders the range to the south and east.

Ownership is split roughly equally between private ownership and the Bureau of Land Management. Suburbs of Elko back up to the southern part of the Adobes, where the ski area Elko Snobowl is located. Several coal mines are to be found in the northern part of the range.

The Adobe Range is a newly developed climbing area, with routes on conglomerate rock ranging from YDS 5.6 to 5.10.
