= Rinker Peak =

Mountain in Colorado, United States

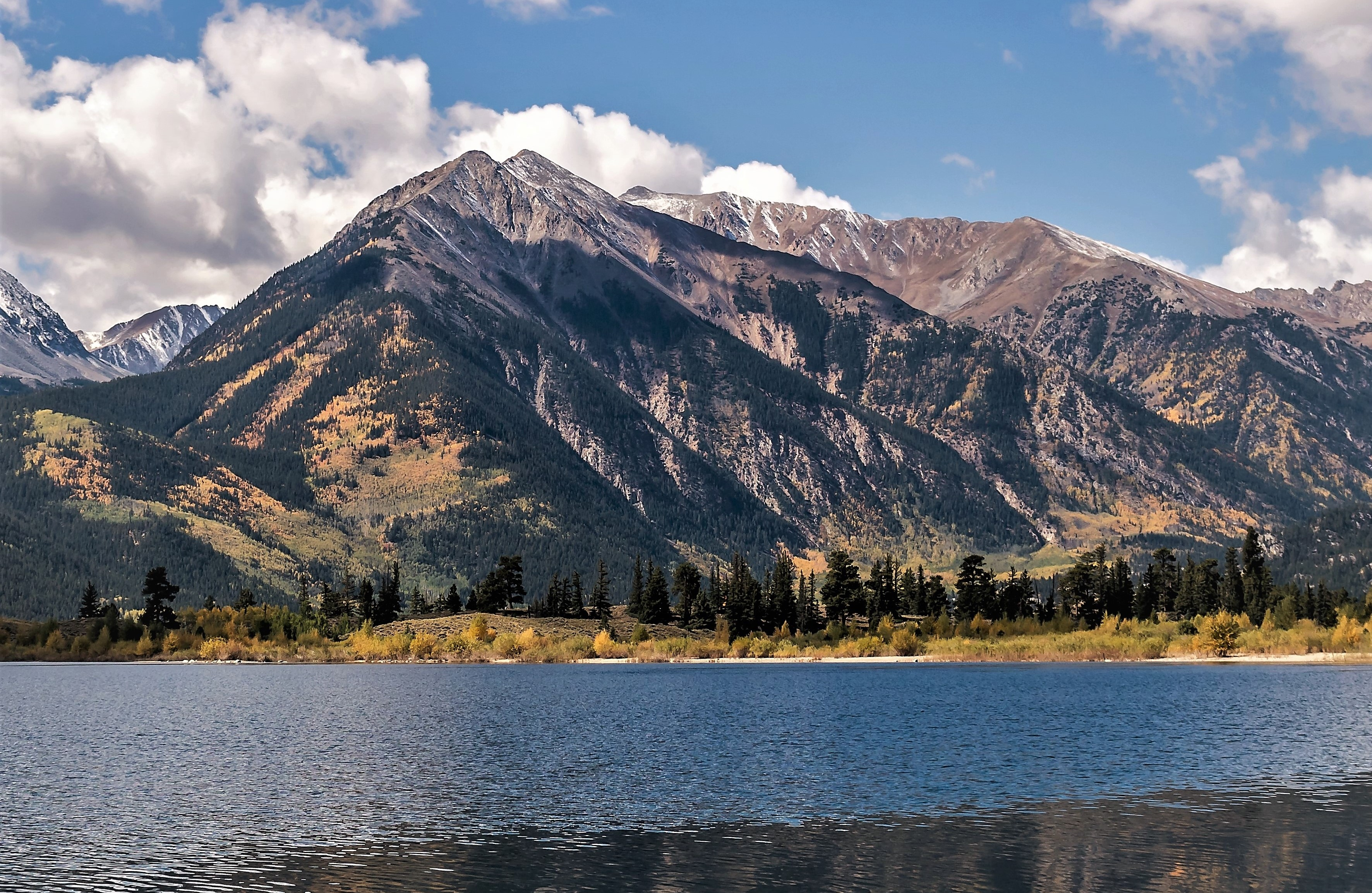
- Twin Peaks and Rinker Peak (behind); Northeast aspect, from Twin Lakes

Highest point
- Elevation: 13,789 ft (4,203 m)
- Prominence: 943 ft (287 m)
- Parent peak: Mount Hope (13,939 ft)
- Isolation: 1.53 mi (2.46 km)
- Coordinates: 39°02′12″N 106°26′24″W

Naming
- Etymology: Robert Lee Rinker

Geography
- Location within Colorado Location within the United States
- Country: United States
- State: Colorado
- County: Chaffee
- Protected area: San Isabel National Forest
- Parent range: Rocky Mountains; Sawatch Range; Collegiate Peaks
- Topo map: USGS Mount Elbert

Climbing
- Easiest route: class 2 hiking Northeast ridge

Rinker Peak is a 13,789-foot (4,203 m) mountain summit in Chaffee County, Colorado, United States.

== Description ==
Rinker Peak is set approximately seven miles (11 km) east of the Continental Divide in the Collegiate Peaks which are a subrange of the Sawatch Range. The mountain is located four miles (6.4 km) southwest of Twin Lakes on land managed by San Isabel National Forest. It ranks as the 114th-highest summit in Colorado. Precipitation runoff from the mountain's slopes drains into Lake Creek which is a tributary of the Arkansas River. Topographic relief is significant as the summit rises 4,100 feet (1,250 m) above Lake Creek in two miles (3.2 km). The highest peak in Colorado, Mount Elbert, is 5.59 miles (9.00 km) to the north of Rinker. An ascent of Rinker Peak involves eight miles of hiking with 4,700-feet of elevation gain.

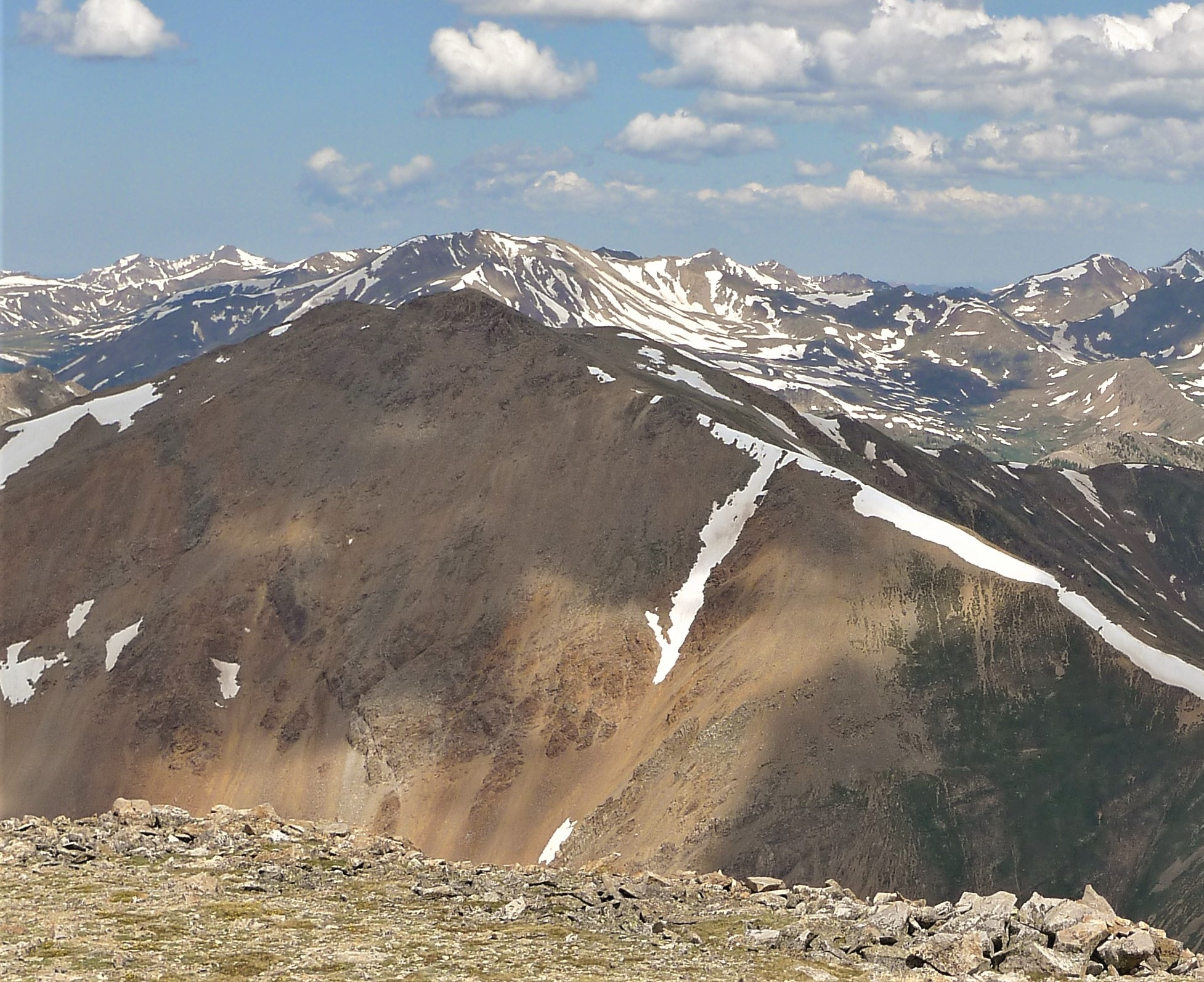
Southeast aspect of Rinker from Mt. Hope

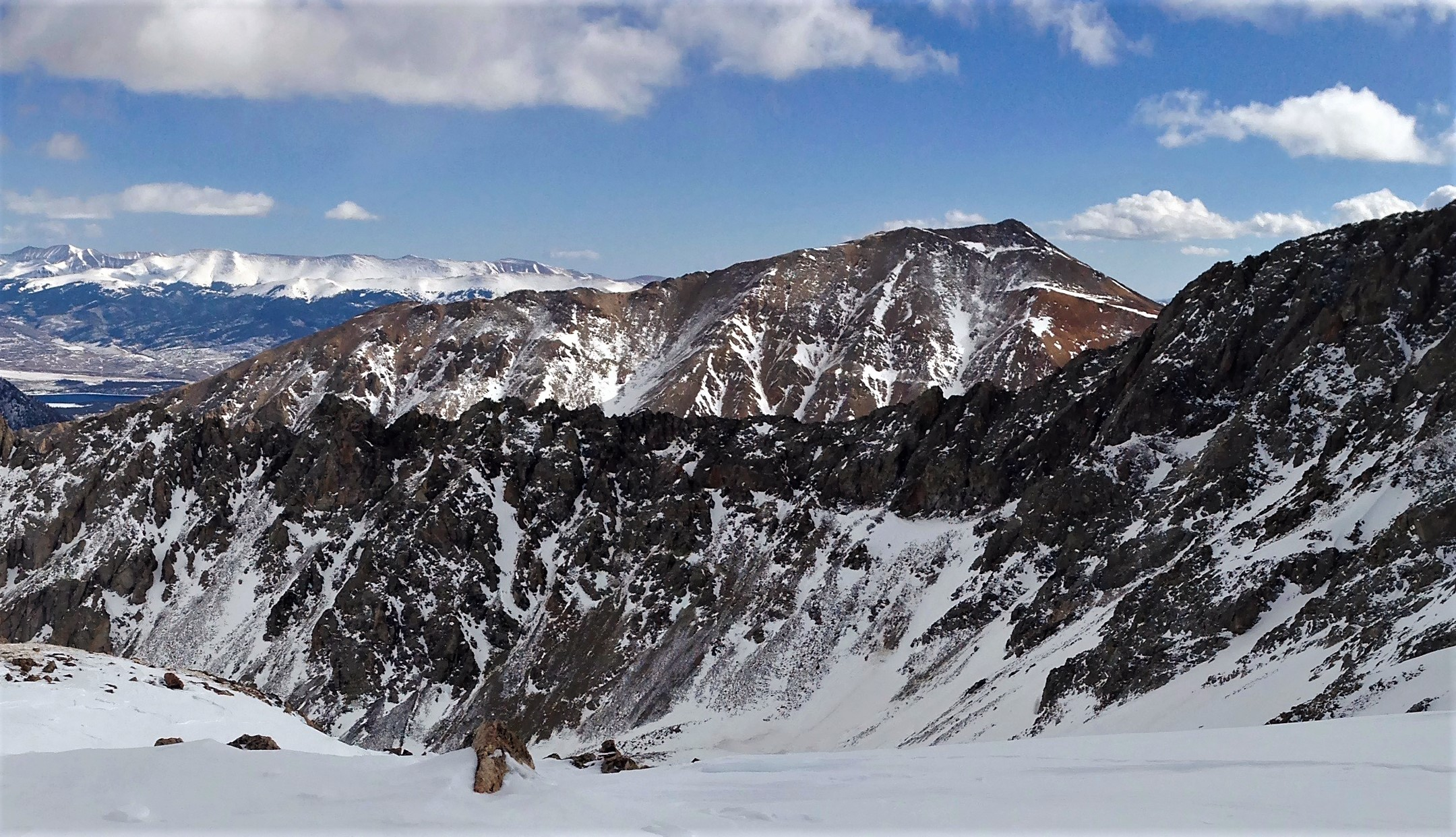
West aspect of Rinker above Ellingwood Ridge

== Etymology ==
The mountain's toponym was officially adopted June 11, 1987, by the United States Board on Geographic Names to remember Robert Lee Rinker (1911–1985) who lived at the base of the mountain for 52 years.

== Climate ==
According to the Köppen climate classification system, Rinker Peak is located in an alpine subarctic climate zone with cold, snowy winters, and cool to warm summers. Due to its altitude, it receives precipitation all year, as snow in winter and as thunderstorms in summer, with a dry period in late spring. Climbers can expect afternoon rain, hail, and lightning from the seasonal monsoon in late July and August.

== See also ==
- Mountains of Chaffee County, Colorado
- Thirteener
