= Twin Peaks (Ouray County, Colorado) =

Mountain in Ouray County, Colorado

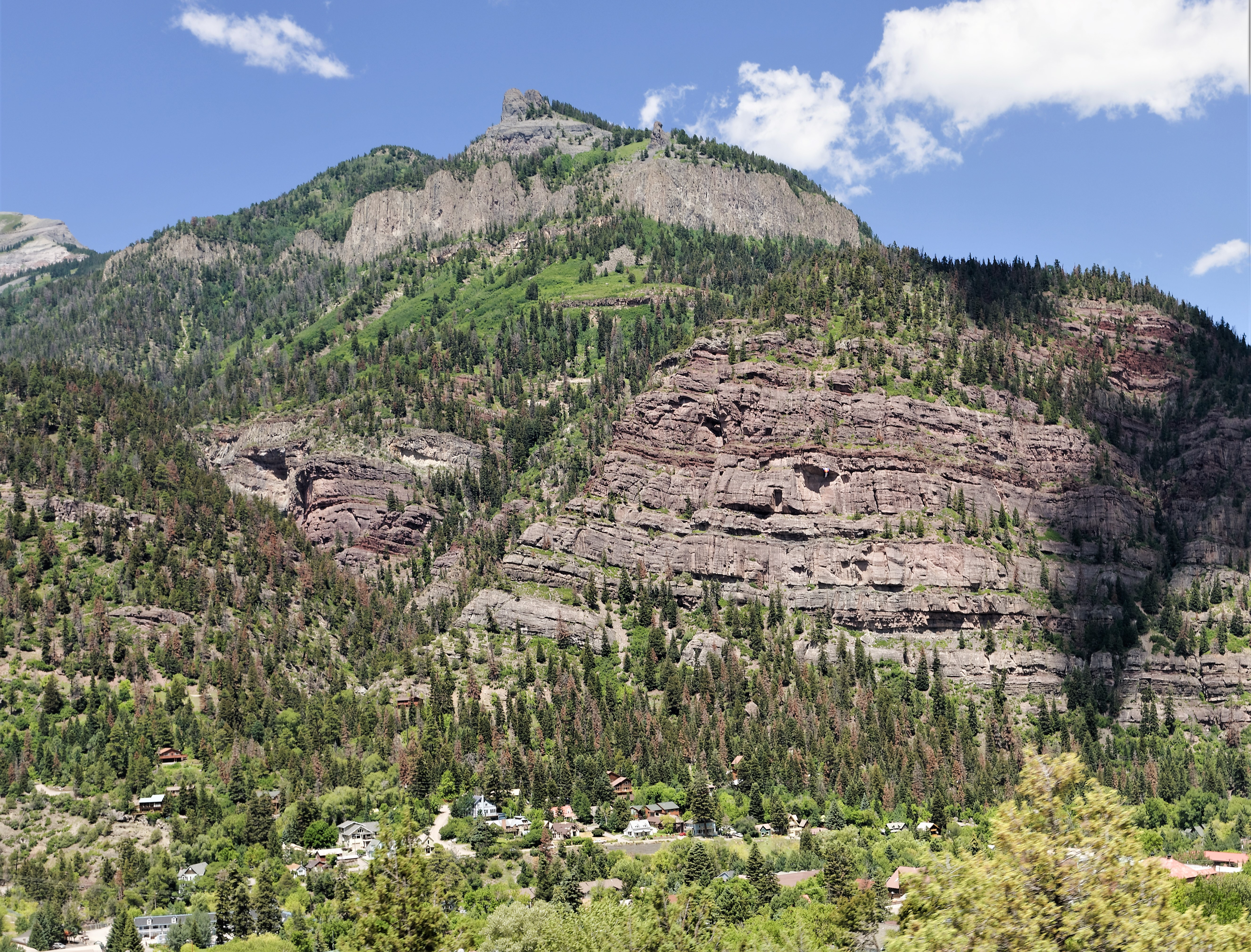
- East aspect above Ouray

Highest point
- Elevation: 10,970 ft (3,340 m)
- Prominence: 230 ft (70 m)
- Isolation: 1.87 mi (3.01 km)
- Coordinates: 38°01′39″N 107°41′57″W

Geography
- Location within Colorado Location within the United States
- Country: United States
- State: Colorado
- County: Ouray County
- Protected area: Uncompahgre National Forest
- Parent range: Rocky Mountains; San Juan Mountains; Sneffels Range
- Topo map: USGS Ouray

Climbing
- Easiest route: class 2 hiking

Twin Peaks is a 10,970-foot-elevation (3,340-meter) double summit mountain located in Ouray County, Colorado, United States.

== Description ==
Twin Peaks is situated one mile west overlooking of the town of Ouray, on land managed by Uncompahgre National Forest. It is part of the Sneffels Range which is a subrange of the San Juan Mountains. Twin Peaks' summit, the West Peak, is 2.2 miles east-northeast of Whitehouse Mountain, and the lower East Peak (10,798 ft) is separated by 0.4 mile from the west summit. Topographic relief is significant as the east peak rises over 2,000 feet (610 meters) above Ouray in one mile. Precipitation runoff from the mountain drains into the Uncompahgre River at the eastern base of the mountain. The mountain's toponym has been officially adopted by the United States Board on Geographic Names.

== Climate ==
According to the Köppen climate classification system, Twin Peaks is located in an alpine subarctic climate zone with long, cold, snowy winters, and cool to warm summers. Due to its altitude, it receives precipitation all year, as snow in winter and as thunderstorms in summer, with a dry period in late spring.

== See also ==
- Mountains of Ouray County, Colorado

== Gallery ==
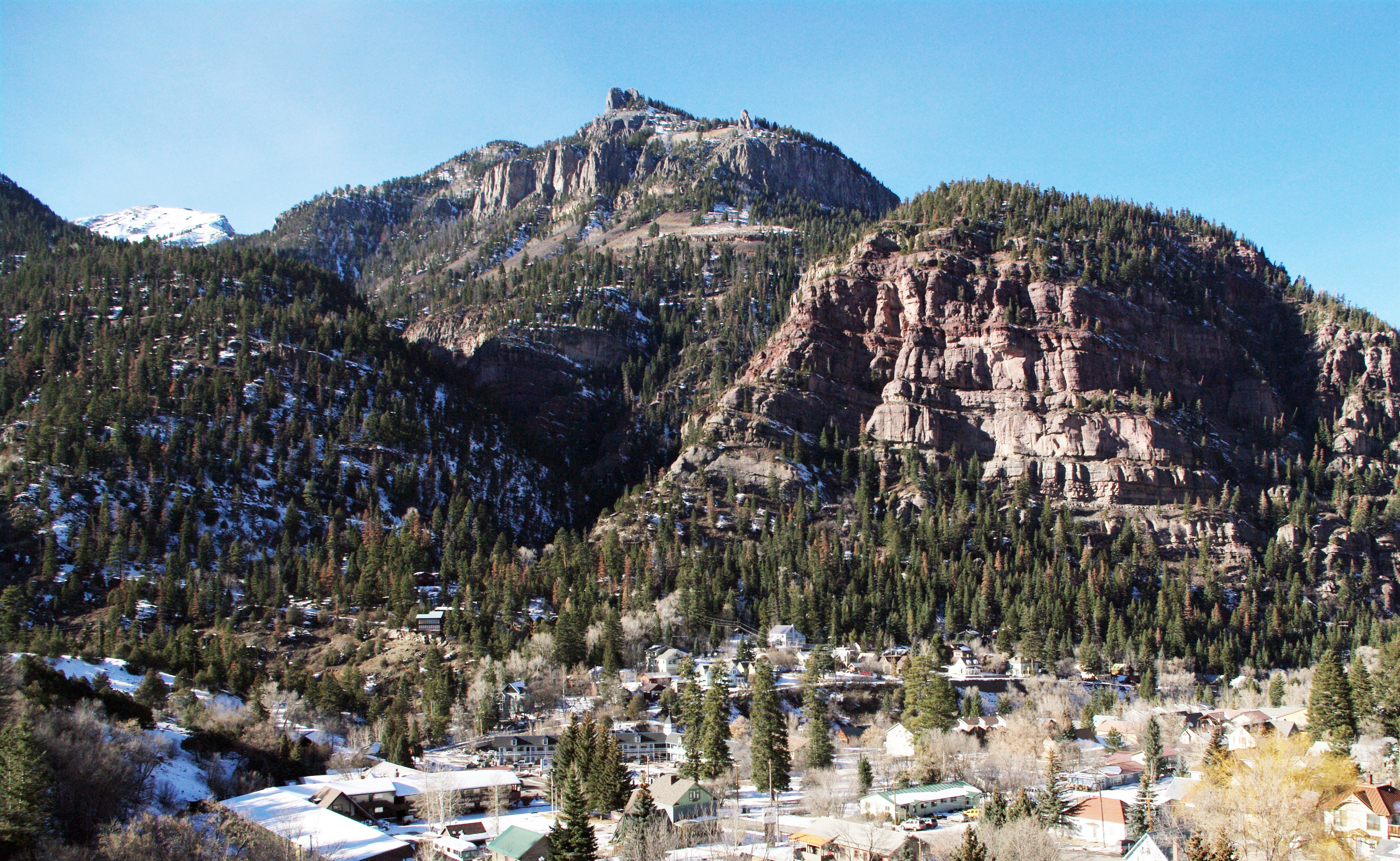
Twin Peaks above the town of Ouray, Colorado

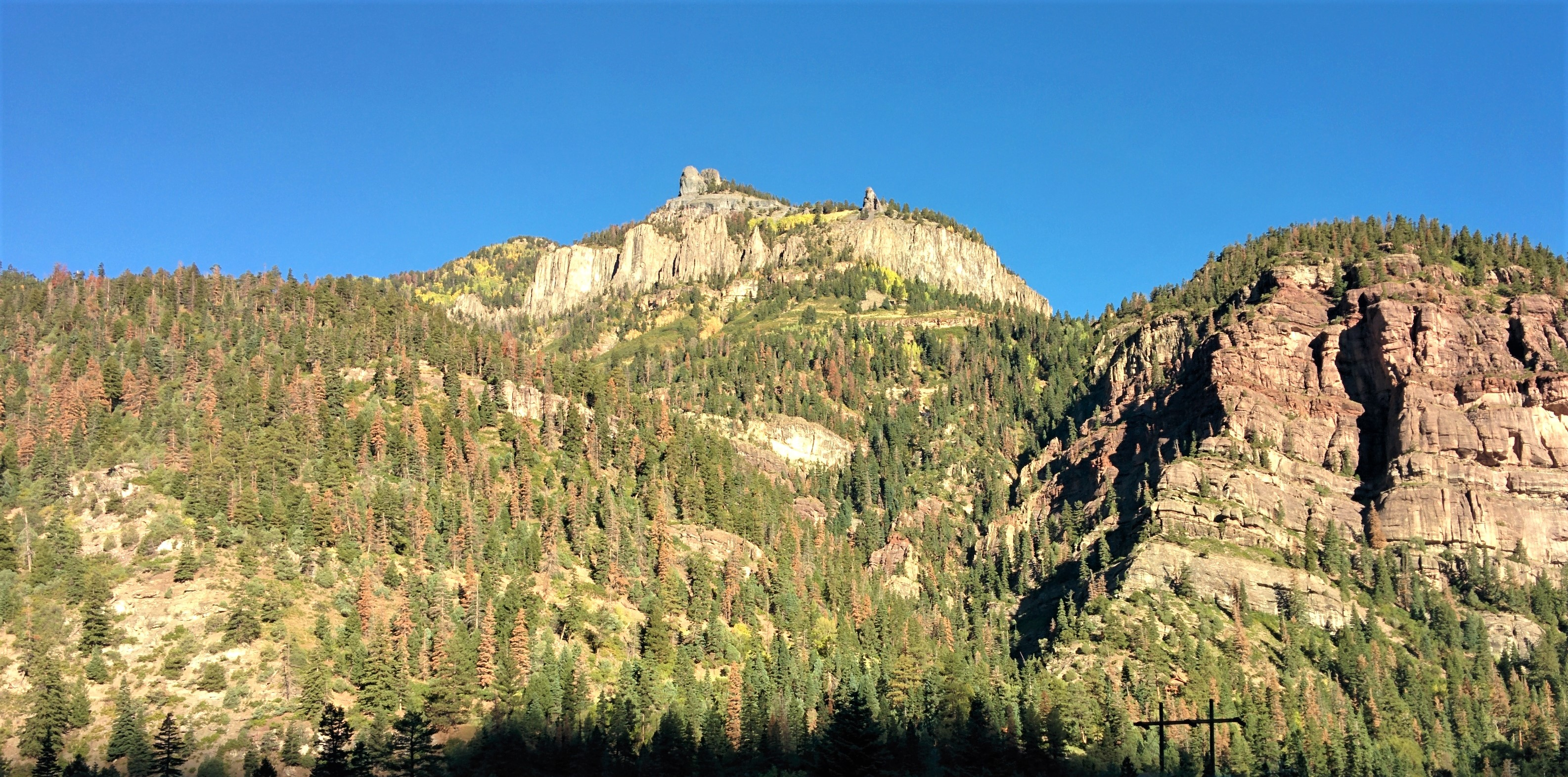
East peak of Twin Peaks centered with West summit to left.

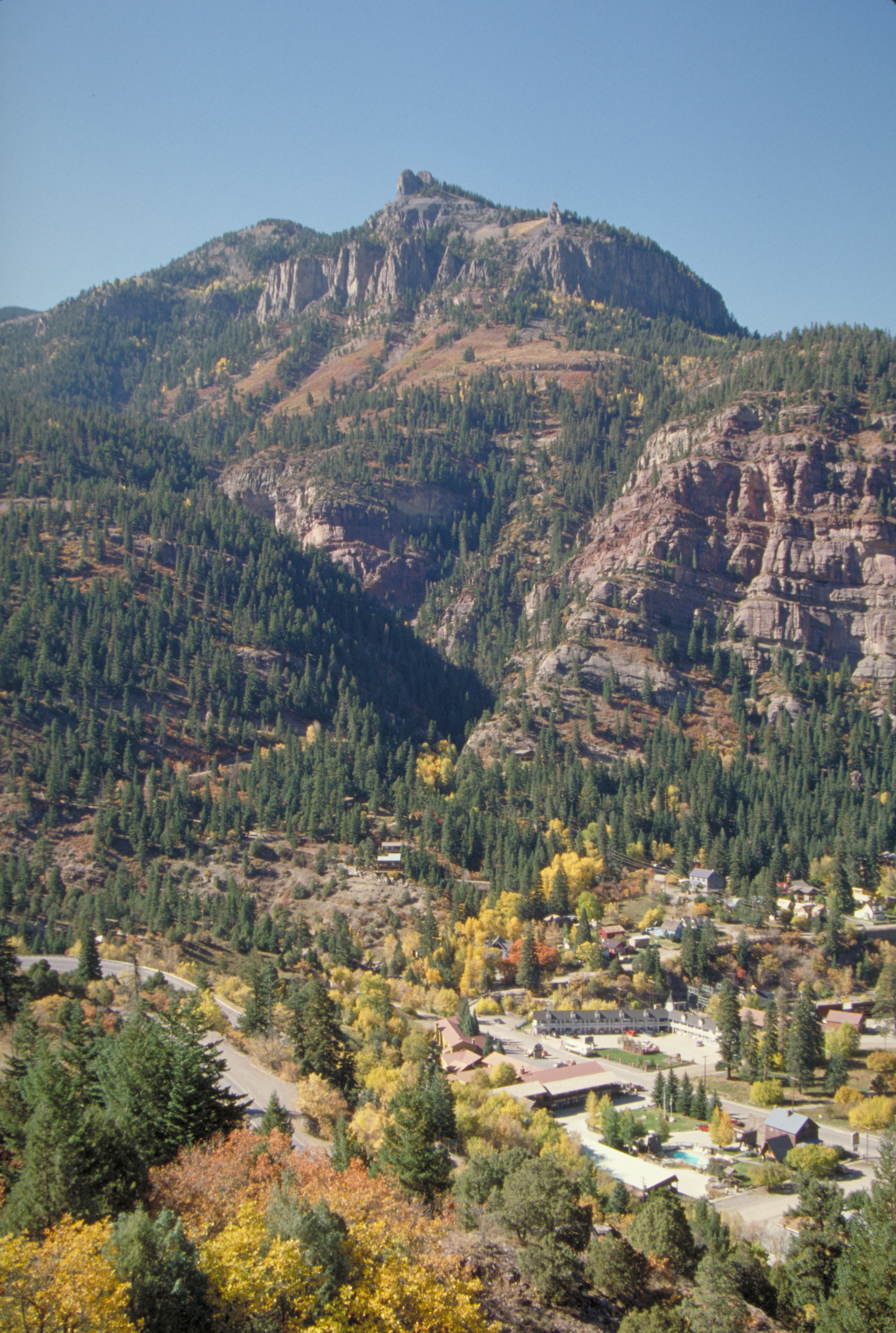

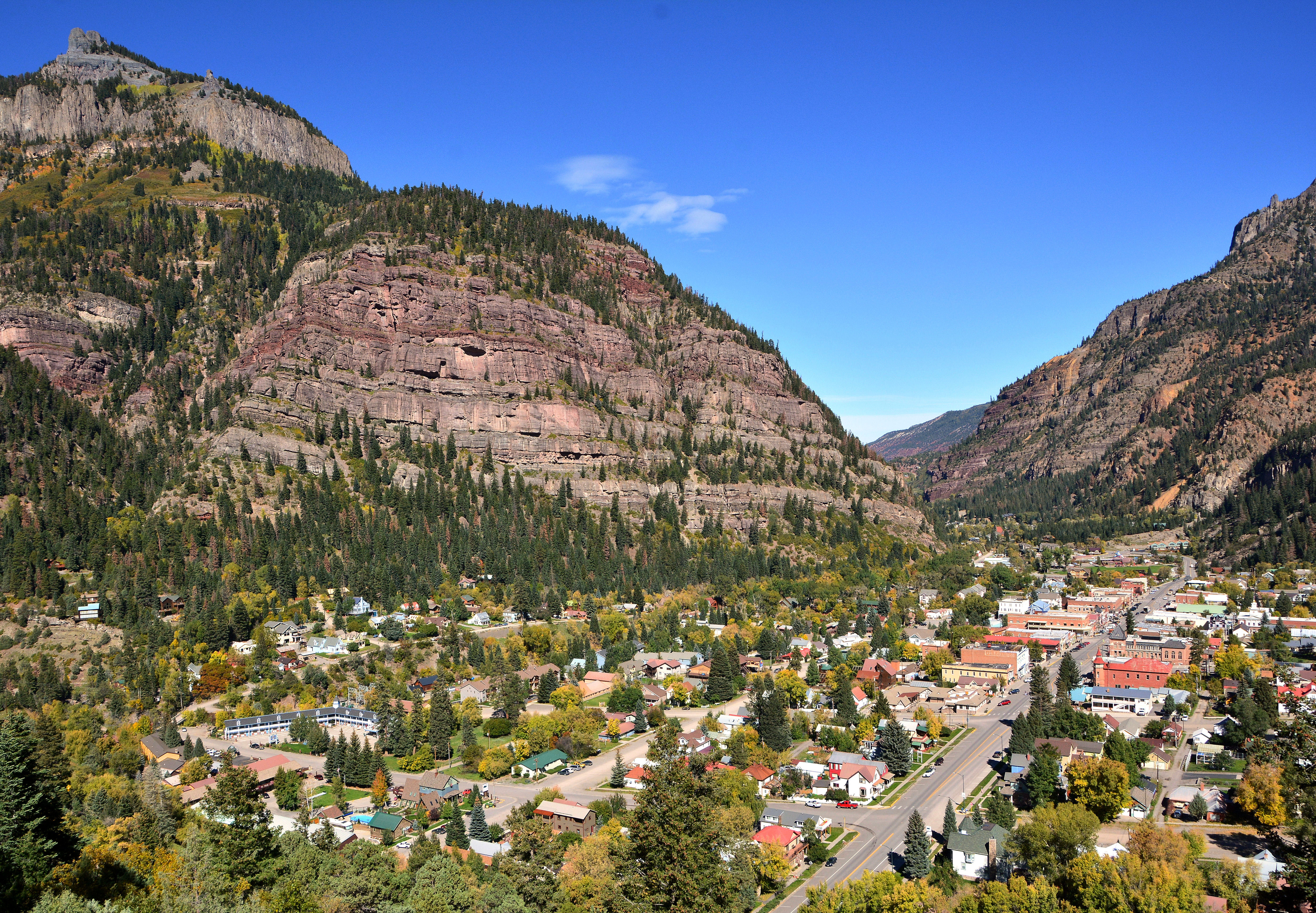
Ouray, Colorado, with Twin Peaks at upper left corner
