= Avenues Twin Peaks =

Twin peaks in the American state of Utah

Twin Peaks
- Avenues Twin Peaks

Highest point
- Elevation: 6,283 ft (1,915 m)
- Coordinates: 40.7948084°N 111.8412277°W

Geography
- Country: United States of America
- State: Utah
- County: Salt Lake
- City: Salt Lake City
- Parent range: Wasatch Range
- Topo map: Fort Douglas

The Twin Peaks are a pair of high points located within the Wasatch Range foothills in Salt Lake City, Utah. They are usually referred to as the Avenues Twin Peaks, to distinguish them from the nearby and much-higher Broads Fork Twin Peaks and American Fork Twin Peaks. With a maximum elevation of 6,283 feet (1,915 m), neither high point has the prominence to be considered a true summit. The Avenues Twin Peaks are a popular hiking destination.
