= Broads Fork Twin Peaks =

Mountain in the American state of Utah

Twin Peaks
- Broads Fork Twin Peaks
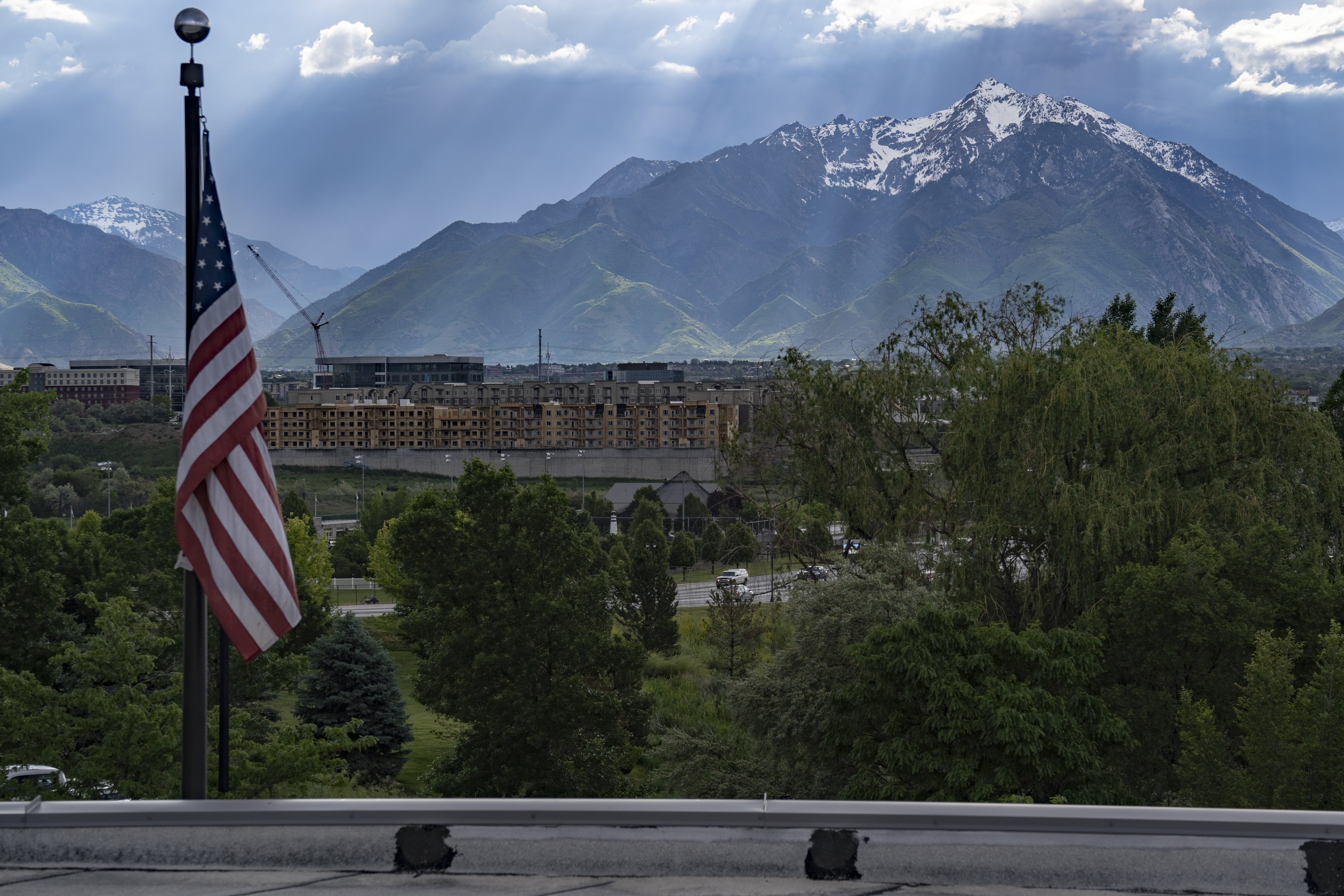

Highest point
- Elevation: 11,330 ft (3,450 m)
- Coordinates: 40.5938379°N 111.7210401°W

Geography
- Country: United States of America
- State: Utah
- County: Salt Lake
- Parent range: Wasatch Range
- Topo map: Dromedary Peak

Climbing
- Easiest route: Scramble

The Twin Peaks are a pair of mountain high points located on the Cottonwood Ridge within the Wasatch Range in Salt Lake County, Utah. They are usually referred to as the Broads Fork Twin Peaks, to distinguish them from the nearby American Fork Twin Peaks and Avenues Twin Peaks. Consisting of two sub-peaks, only the eastern peak has the prominence to be considered a true summit, with an elevation of 11,330 feet (3,450 m), 2 feet higher than the western subpeak. The eastern peak is the second-highest in Salt Lake County, only behind the nearby American Fork Twins. The Twin Peaks rise directly from the Salt Lake Valley, making them easily visible and recognizable.

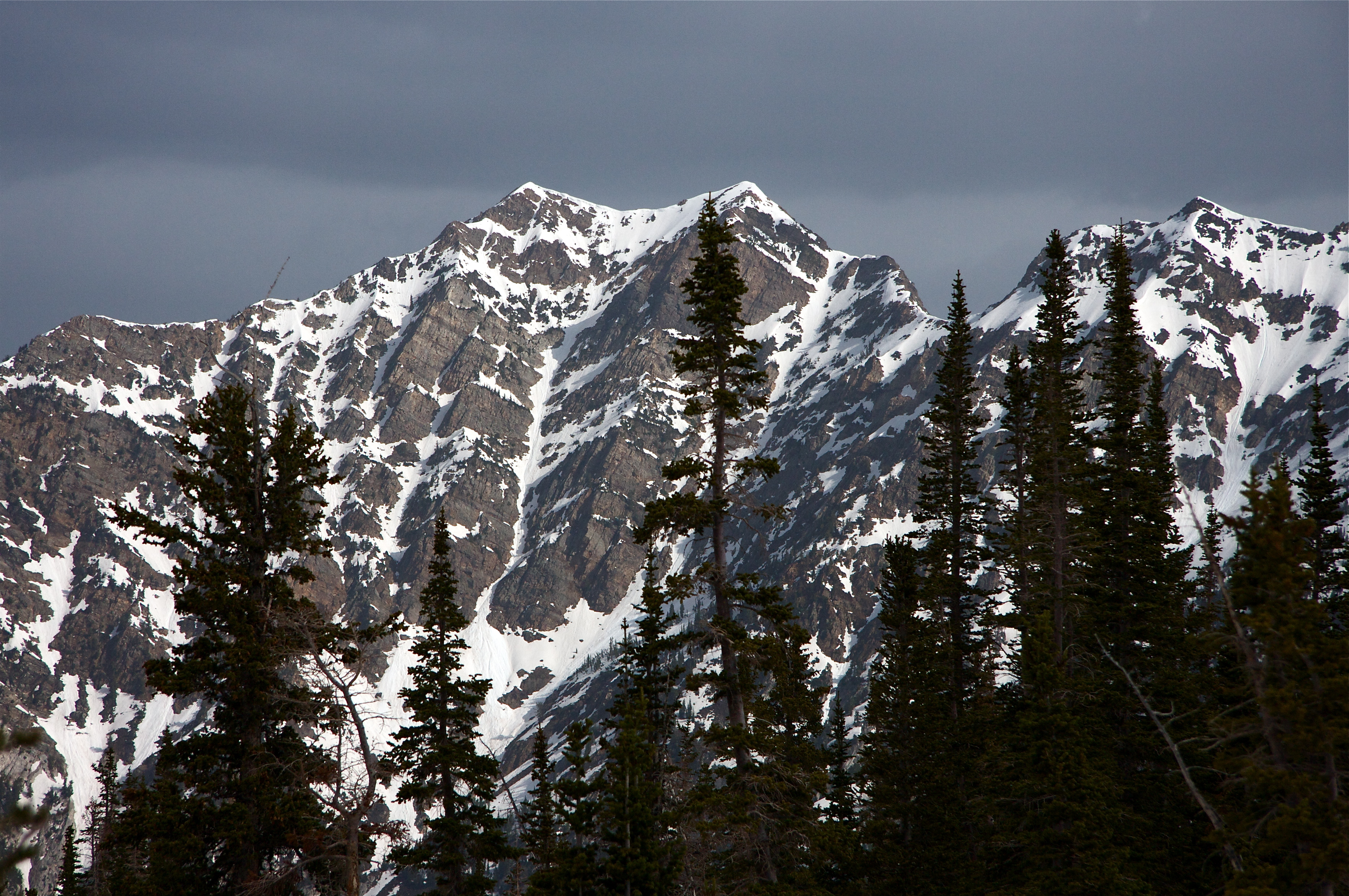
Broads Fork Twin Peaks

== Climate ==
Climate data for Broads Fork Twin Peaks 40.5915 N, 111.7216 W, Elevation: 10,663 ft (3,250 m) (1991–2020 normals)
Month	Jan	Feb	Mar	Apr	May	Jun	Jul	Aug	Sep	Oct	Nov	Dec	Year
Mean daily maximum °F (°C)	27.6 (−2.4)	27.5 (−2.5)	32.3 (0.2)	37.5 (3.1)	47.2 (8.4)	59.1 (15.1)	68.7 (20.4)	67.0 (19.4)	57.9 (14.4)	44.8 (7.1)	33.7 (0.9)	27.1 (−2.7)	44.2 (6.8)
Daily mean °F (°C)	18.5 (−7.5)	17.5 (−8.1)	22.0 (−5.6)	26.7 (−2.9)	35.9 (2.2)	46.9 (8.3)	56.2 (13.4)	54.8 (12.7)	46.2 (7.9)	34.3 (1.3)	24.5 (−4.2)	18.2 (−7.7)	33.5 (0.8)
Mean daily minimum °F (°C)	9.4 (−12.6)	7.6 (−13.6)	11.6 (−11.3)	15.9 (−8.9)	24.7 (−4.1)	34.8 (1.6)	43.6 (6.4)	42.5 (5.8)	34.4 (1.3)	23.8 (−4.6)	15.3 (−9.3)	9.3 (−12.6)	22.7 (−5.2)
Average precipitation inches (mm)	6.37 (162)	5.38 (137)	5.32 (135)	5.47 (139)	4.12 (105)	1.89 (48)	1.16 (29)	1.70 (43)	2.61 (66)	3.74 (95)	4.68 (119)	5.62 (143)	48.06 (1,221)
Source: PRISM Climate Group
