= Twin Peaks (Chaffee County, Colorado) =

Mountain in Colorado, United States

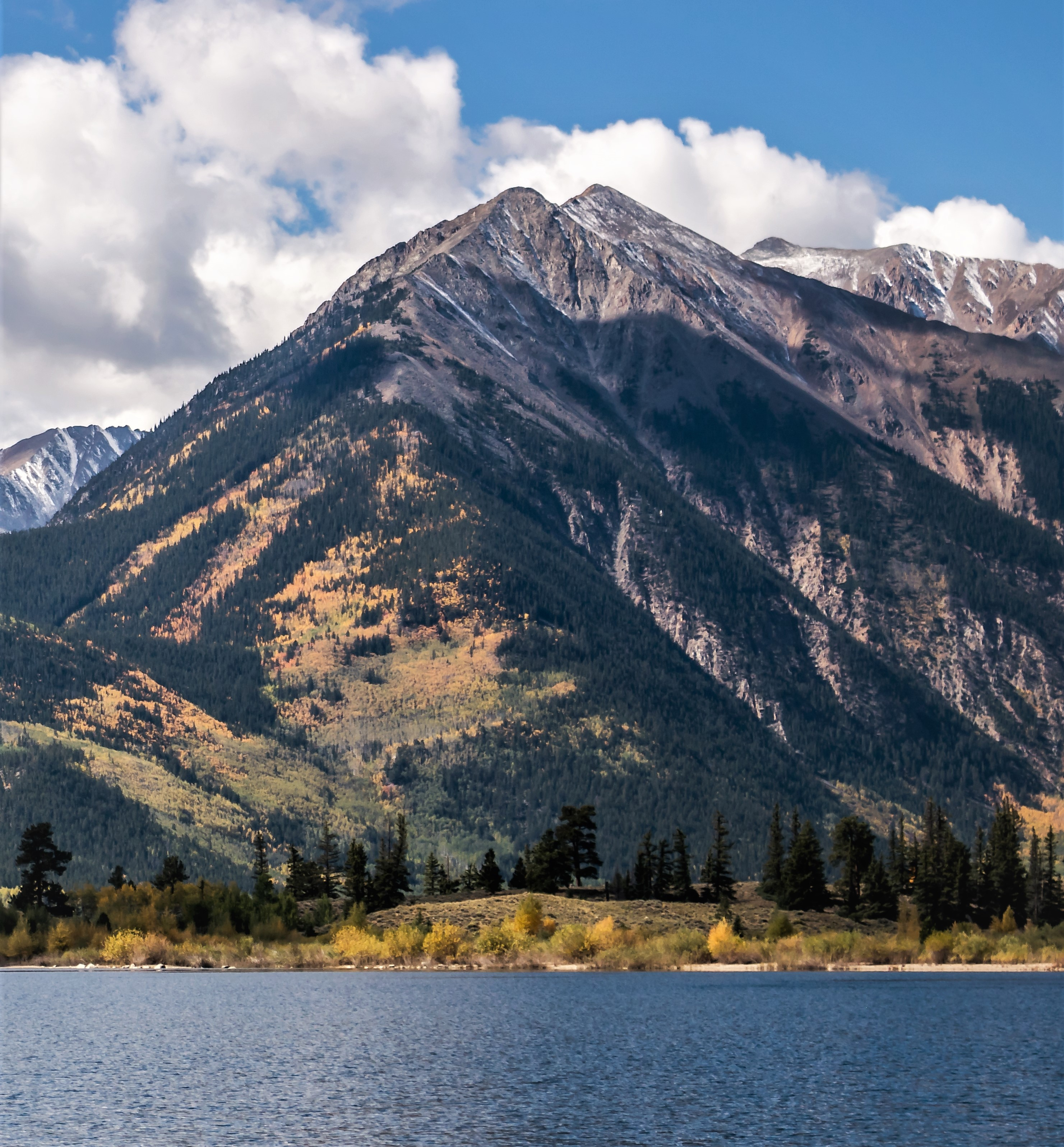
- Northeast aspect, from Twin Lakes

Highest point
- Elevation: 13,341 ft (4,066 m)
- Prominence: 251 ft (77 m)
- Parent peak: Rinker Peak (13,789 ft)
- Isolation: 0.86 mi (1.38 km)
- Coordinates: 39°02′32″N 106°25′32″W

Geography
- Location within Colorado Location within the United States
- Country: United States
- State: Colorado
- County: Chaffee
- Protected area: San Isabel National Forest
- Parent range: Rocky Mountains; Sawatch Range; Collegiate Peaks
- Topo map: USGS Mount Elbert

Climbing
- Easiest route: class 2 hiking

Twin Peaks is a 13,341-foot (4,066 m) mountain summit in Chaffee County, Colorado, United States.

== Description ==
Twin Peaks is set approximately eight miles (13 km) east of the Continental Divide in the Collegiate Peaks which are a subrange of the Sawatch Range. The mountain is located three miles (4.8 km) southwest of Twin Lakes on land managed by San Isabel National Forest. Precipitation runoff from the peak's slopes drains to Lake Creek which is a tributary of the Arkansas River. Topographic relief is significant as the summit rises 3,740 feet (1,140 m) above Lake Creek in 1.5 miles (2.4 km). The highest peak in Colorado, Mount Elbert, is 4.97 miles (8.00 km) to the north and line parent Rinker Peak is 0.62 mile to the southwest. The mountain's toponym has been officially adopted by the United States Board on Geographic Names.

== Climate ==
According to the Köppen climate classification system, Twin Peaks is located in an alpine subarctic climate zone with cold, snowy winters, and cool to warm summers. Due to its altitude, it receives precipitation all year, as snow in winter and as thunderstorms in summer, with a dry period in late spring. Climbers can expect afternoon rain, hail, and lightning from the seasonal monsoon in late July and August.

== Gallery slideshow ==
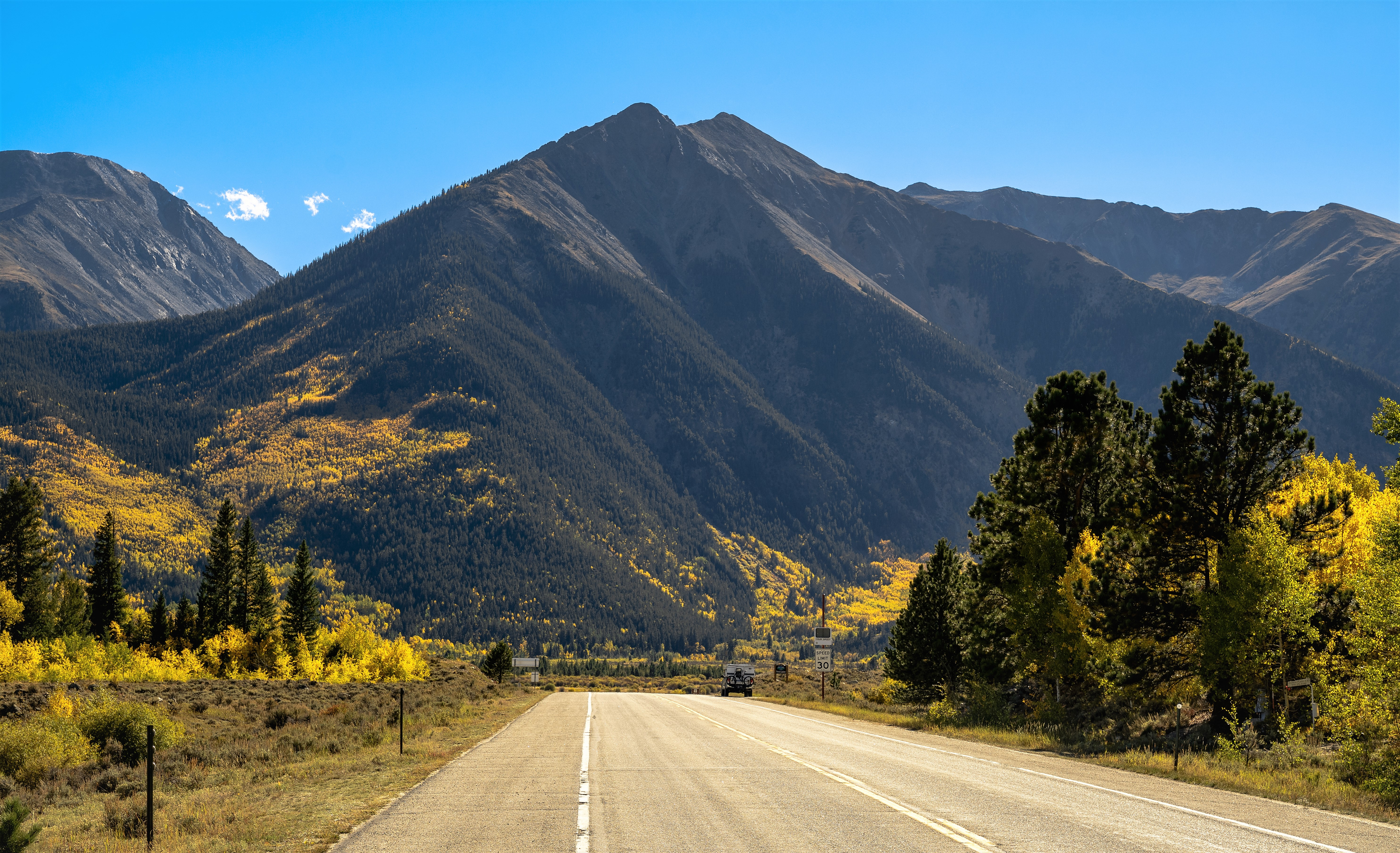
Northeast aspect of Twin Peaks from Highway 82

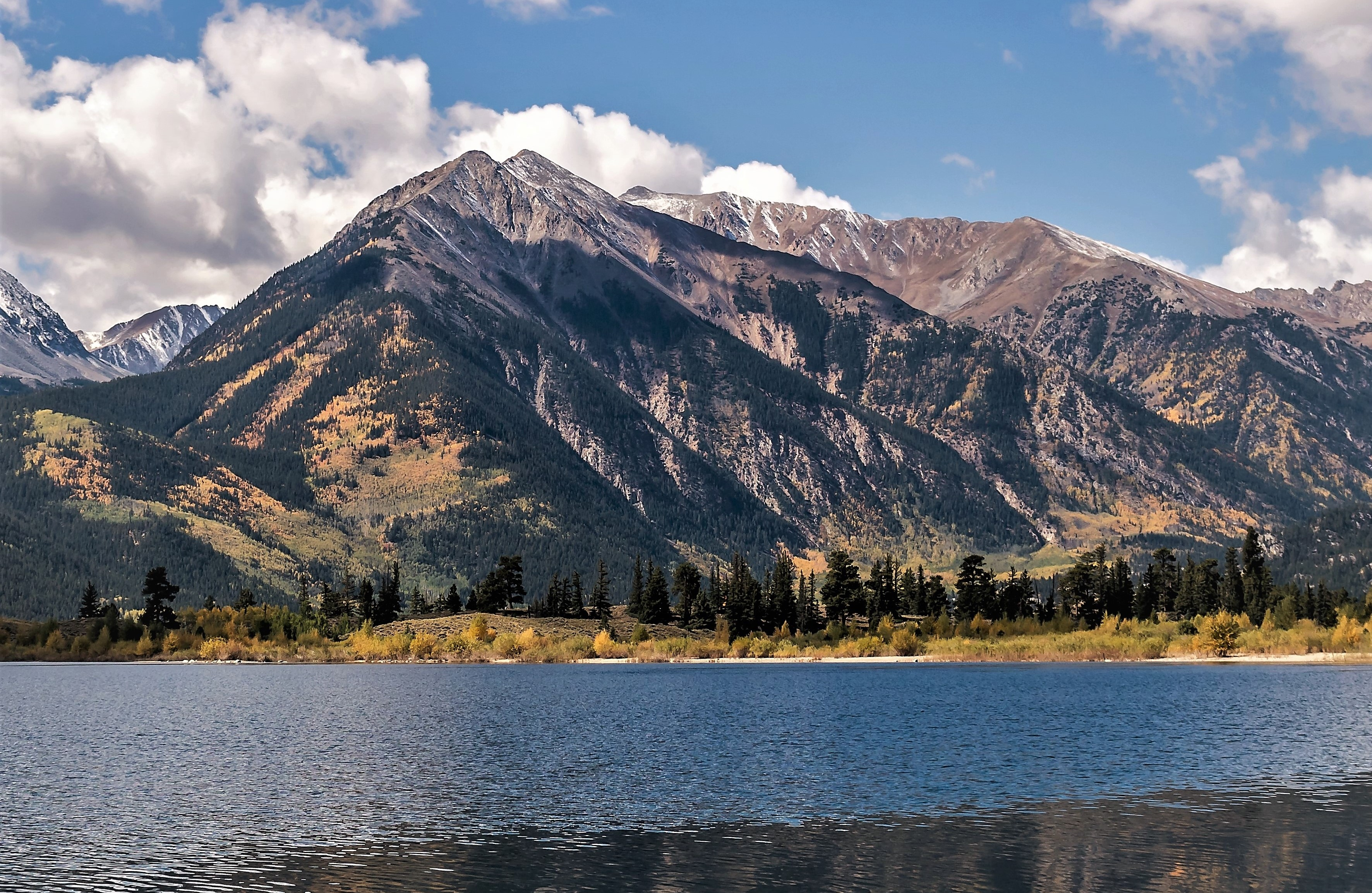
Northeast aspect of Twin Peaks and Rinker Peak (behind), from Twin Lakes

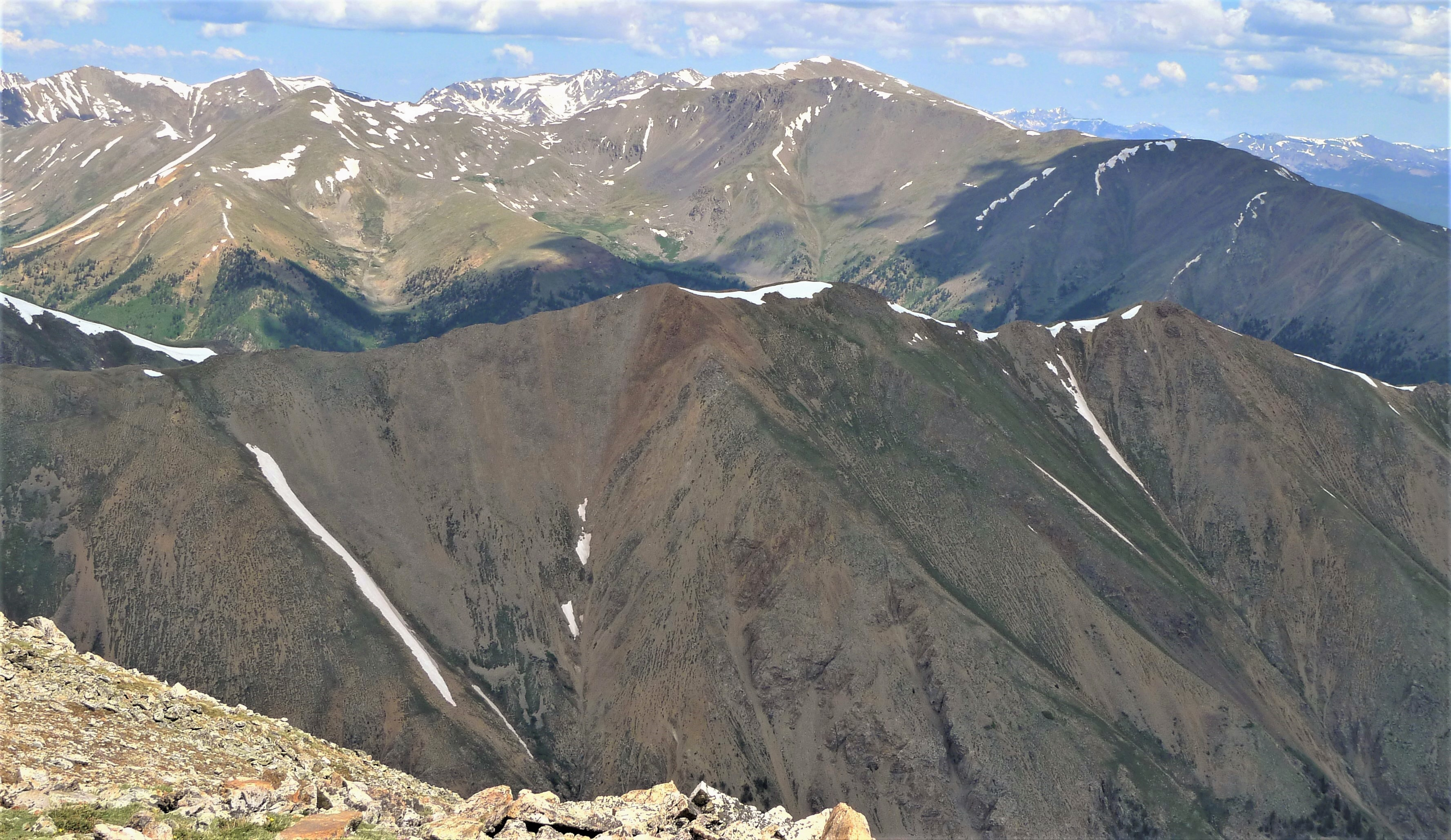
South aspect of Twin Peaks (centered) viewed from Mount Hope. Centered at the top in the distance are Mount Elbert and Mount Massive (the two highest peaks in Colorado and the Rocky Mountains).

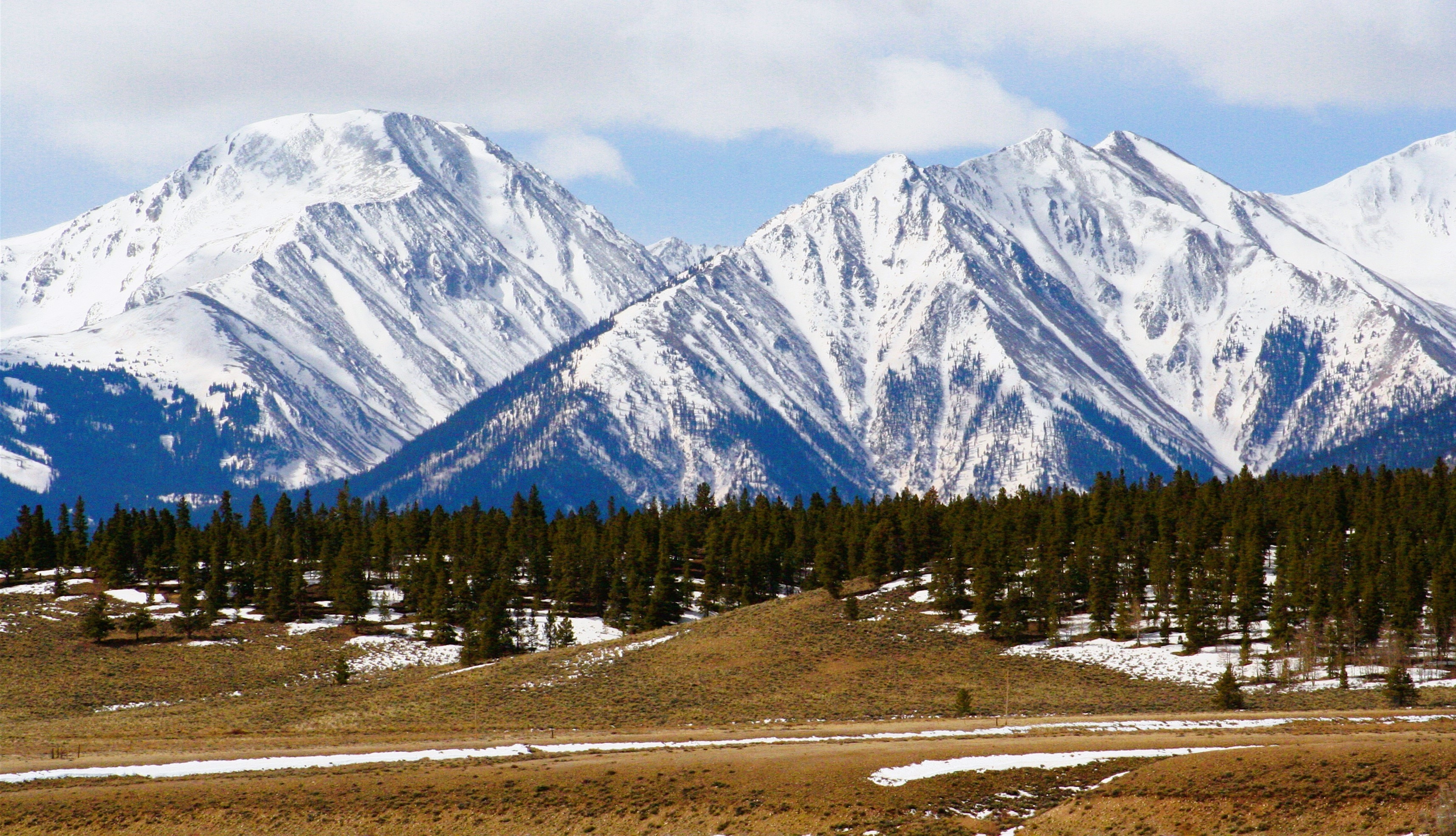
Mount Hope (left) and Twin Peaks (right) viewed from north

== See also ==
- Mountains of Chaffee County, Colorado
- Thirteener
