= Twin Peaks (Churchill County, Nevada) =

Mountain in the state of Nevada

Coordinates: 39°24′34″N 118°03′25″W

Twin Peaks is a summit in the U.S. state of Nevada. The elevation is 7,093 feet (2,162 m).

Twin Peaks was descriptively named.
