= American Fork Twin Peaks =

Mountain in the American state of Utah

Twin Peaks
- American Fork Twin Peaks
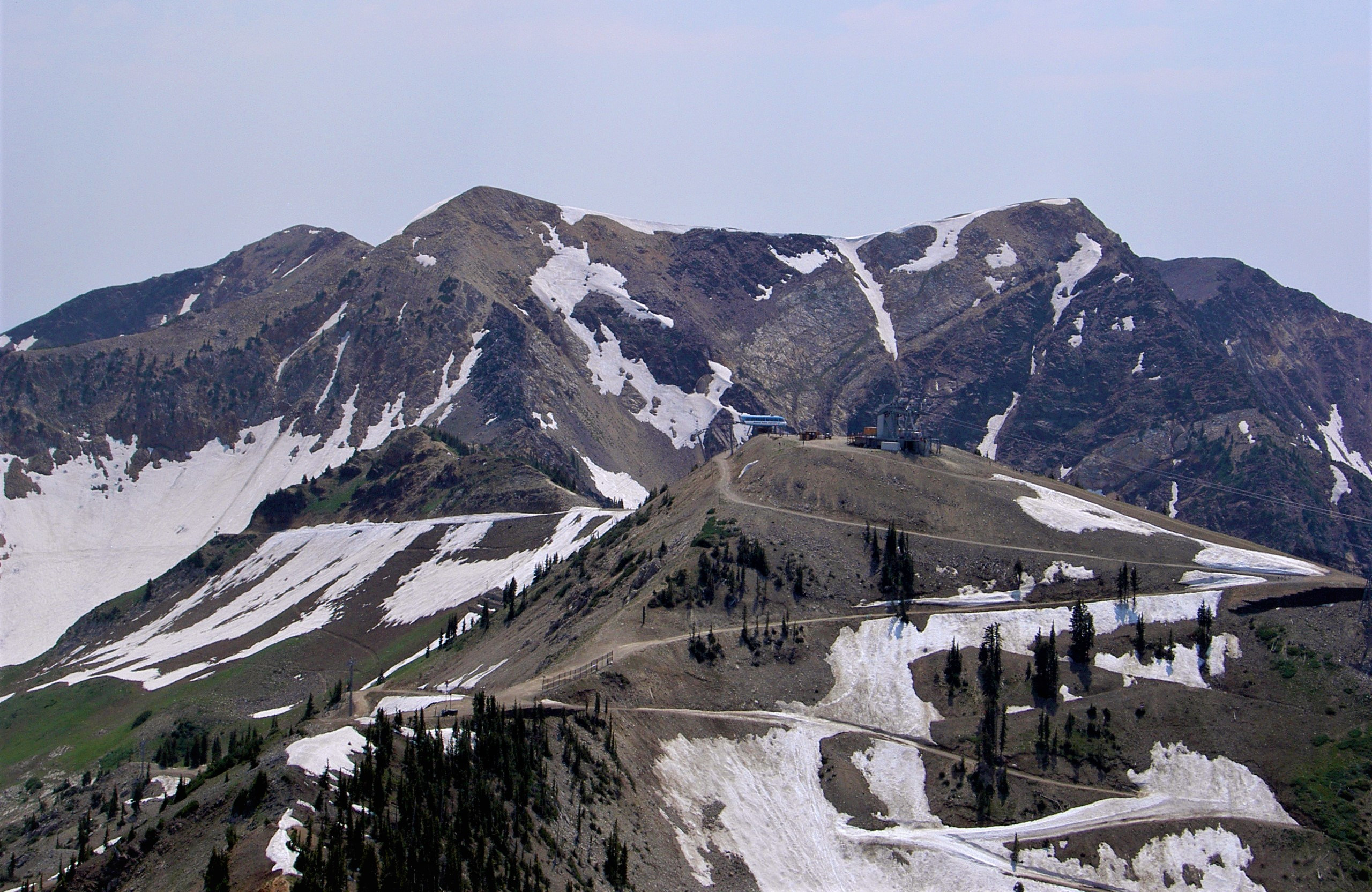
- Northeast aspect

Highest point
- Elevation: 11,461 ft (3,493 m)
- Coordinates: 40.5518953°N 111.6565908°W

Geography
- Location within Utah Location within the United States
- Country: United States of America
- State: Utah
- County: Salt Lake and Utah
- Parent range: Wasatch Range
- Topo map: Dromedary Peak

The Twin Peaks are a set of mountain high points located on the Alpine Ridge within the Wasatch Range in Utah, United States, on the border between Salt Lake and Utah County. They are usually referred to as the American Fork Twin Peaks, to distinguish them from the nearby Broads Fork Twin Peaks and Avenues Twin Peaks. Consisting of several sub-peaks, only one has the prominence to be considered a true summit. The summit has an elevation of 11,461 feet (3,493 m), making it the highest point in Salt Lake County. The peak is also the most prominent in Salt Lake County, and one of the most prominent in the Wasatch Range.

== Climate ==
Climate data for American Fork Twin Peaks 40.5499 N, 111.6606 W, Elevation: 10,988 ft (3,349 m) (1991–2020 normals)
Month	Jan	Feb	Mar	Apr	May	Jun	Jul	Aug	Sep	Oct	Nov	Dec	Year
Mean daily maximum °F (°C)	26.0 (−3.3)	26.2 (−3.2)	31.0 (−0.6)	36.2 (2.3)	45.6 (7.6)	57.1 (13.9)	66.7 (19.3)	65.1 (18.4)	56.4 (13.6)	43.2 (6.2)	32.4 (0.2)	26.0 (−3.3)	42.7 (5.9)
Daily mean °F (°C)	17.3 (−8.2)	16.6 (−8.6)	21.0 (−6.1)	25.6 (−3.6)	34.7 (1.5)	45.3 (7.4)	54.6 (12.6)	53.3 (11.8)	44.9 (7.2)	33.2 (0.7)	23.5 (−4.7)	17.2 (−8.2)	32.3 (0.2)
Mean daily minimum °F (°C)	8.5 (−13.1)	7.0 (−13.9)	10.9 (−11.7)	15.0 (−9.4)	23.8 (−4.6)	33.5 (0.8)	42.5 (5.8)	41.5 (5.3)	33.5 (0.8)	23.3 (−4.8)	14.5 (−9.7)	8.4 (−13.1)	21.9 (−5.6)
Average precipitation inches (mm)	8.33 (212)	6.69 (170)	6.80 (173)	6.80 (173)	5.11 (130)	2.05 (52)	1.33 (34)	2.06 (52)	3.48 (88)	5.11 (130)	6.35 (161)	6.97 (177)	61.08 (1,552)
Source: PRISM Climate Group

== Gallery ==
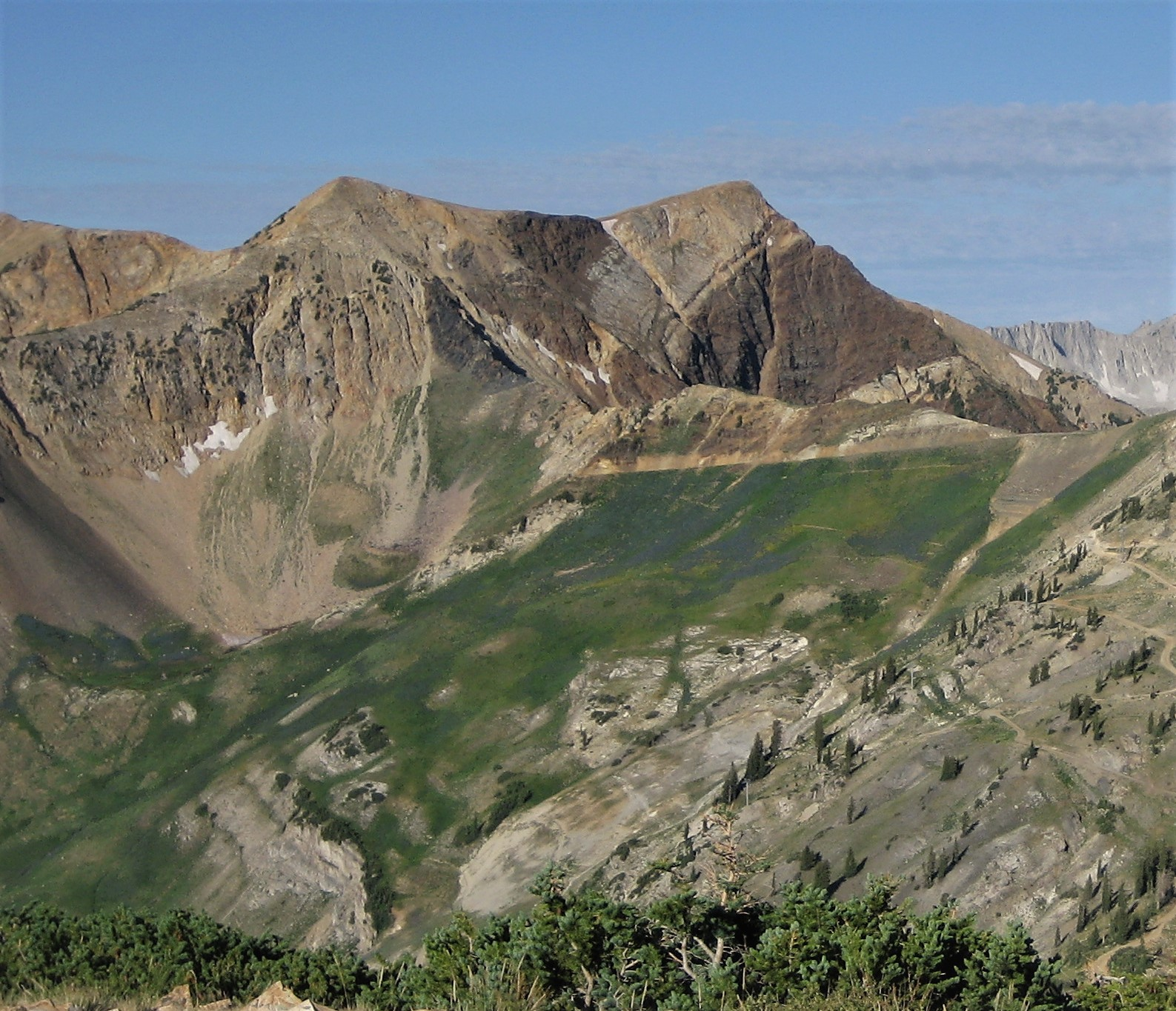
American Fork Twin Peaks

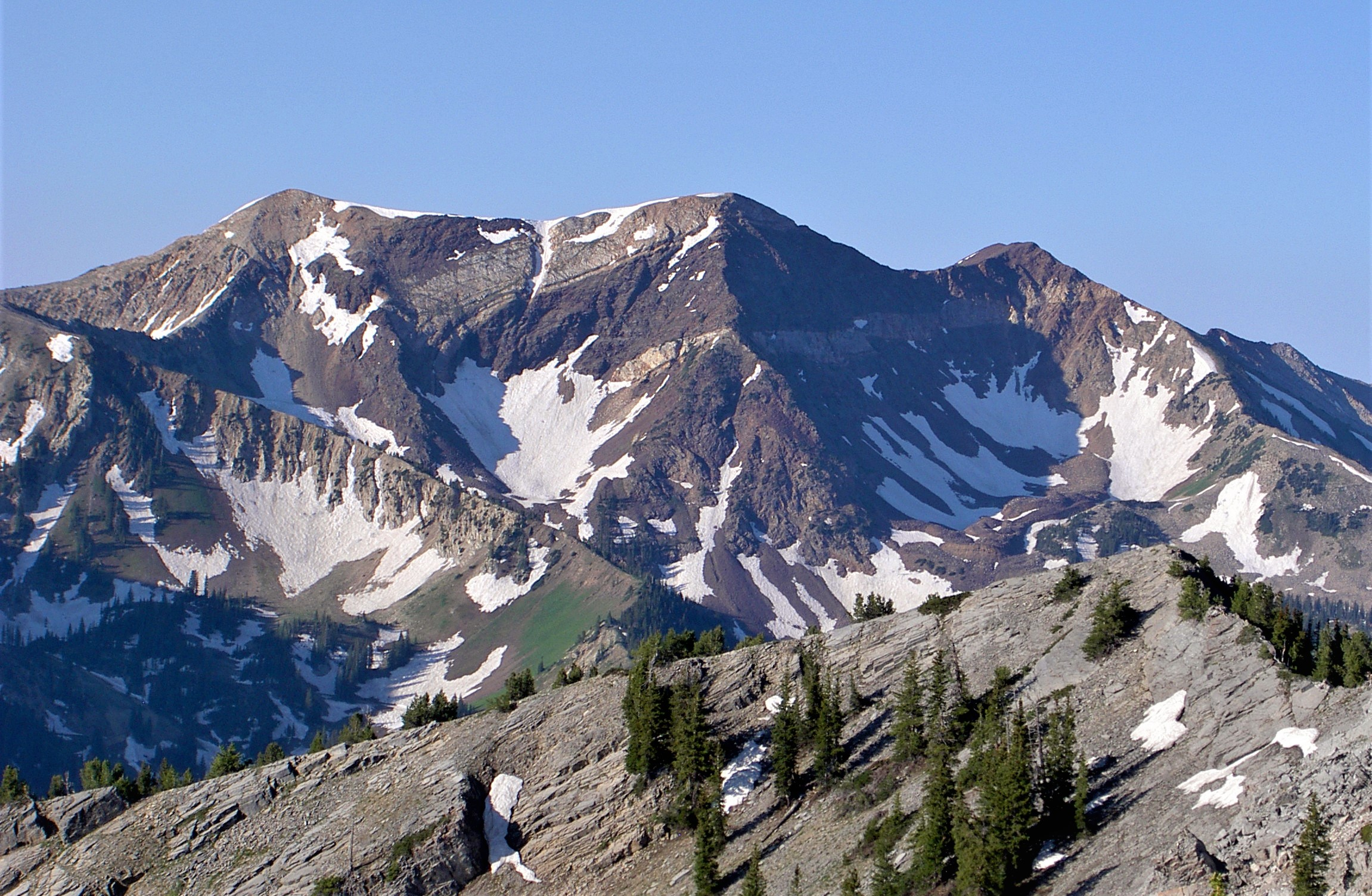
American Fork Twin Peaks

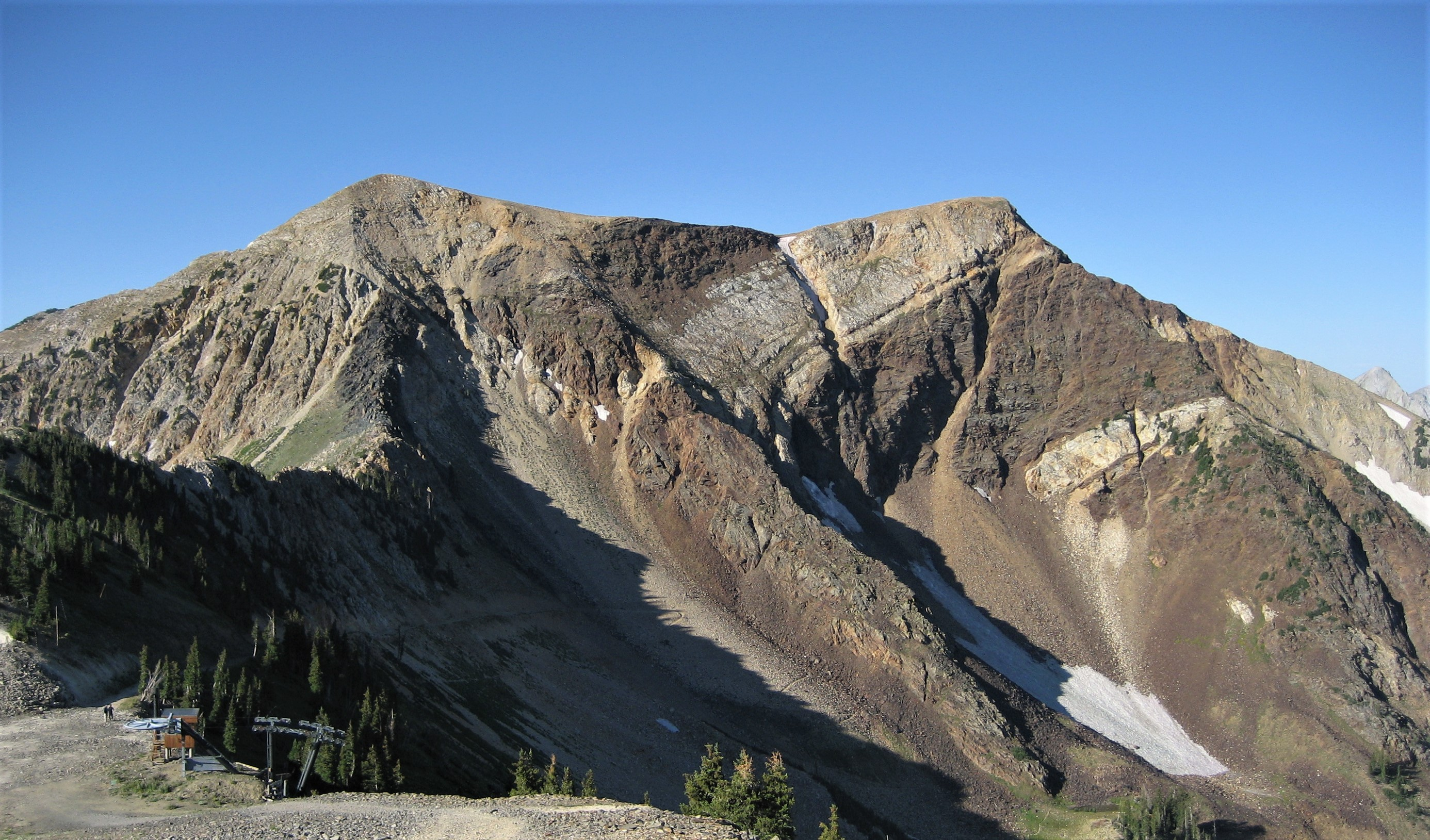
American Fork Twin Peaks
