= Twin Peaks (Elko County, Nevada) =

Twin mountain summits in Nevada, United States

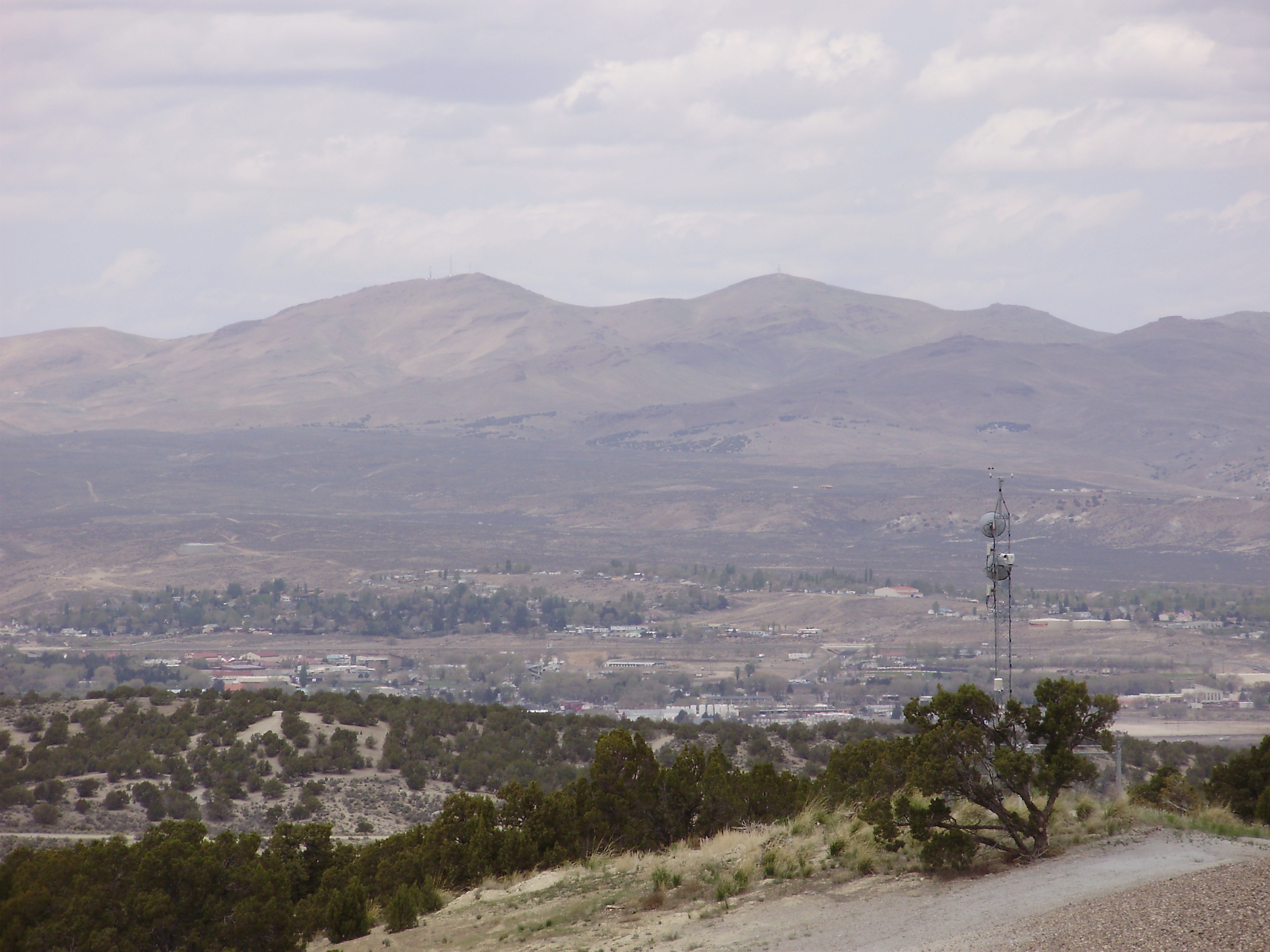
- Twin Peaks viewed from Nevada State Route 227

Highest point
- Elevation: 7,479 ft (2,280 m) NAVD 88
- Prominence: 605 ft (184 m)
- Coordinates: 40°55′44″N 115°50′40″W

Geography
- Location within Nevada
- Location: Elko County, Nevada, U.S.
- Parent range: Adobe Range
- Topo map: KITTRIDGE SPRINGS

Climbing
- Easiest route: A four-wheel drive dirt road leads southeast from Nevada State Route 225 to radio facilities on the summits

Twin Peaks are a pair of mountain peaks in the Adobe Range of Elko County, in Nevada, United States. The East Twin is slightly higher than the West Twin. Both summits contains several radio towers.

== Summit panorama ==
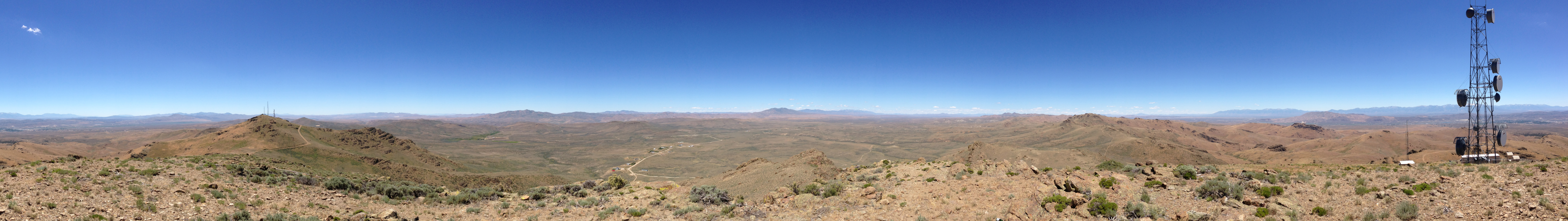
360-degree panorama from the summit of East Twin
