= Vernal Utah Temple =

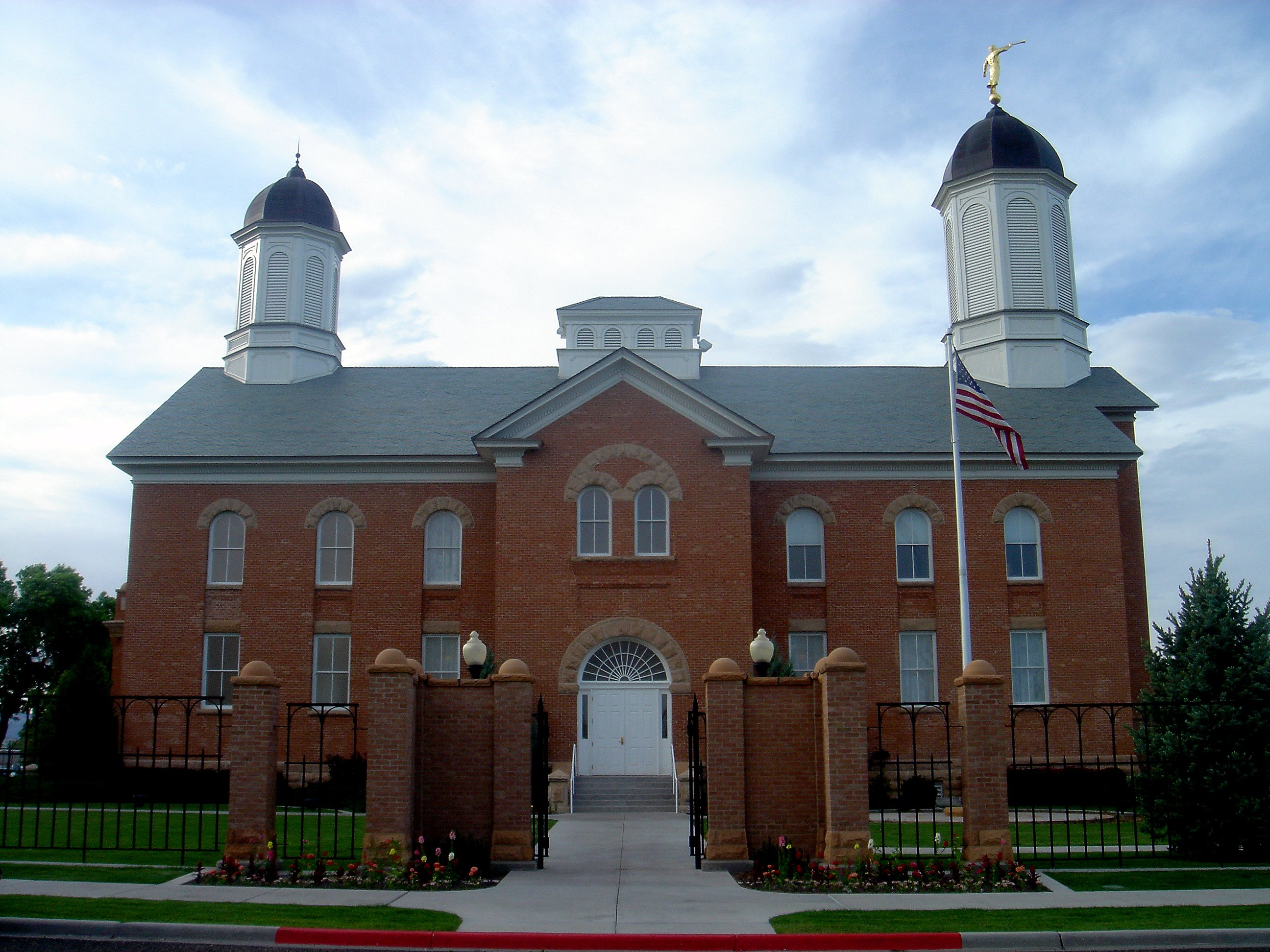
- Interactive map of Vernal Utah Temple
- Number: 51
- Dedication: November 2, 1997, by Gordon B. Hinckley
- Site: 1.6 acres (0.65 ha)
- Floor area: 38,771 ft^{2} (3,601.9 m^{2})
- Official website • News & images

Church chronology
← St. Louis Missouri Temple	Vernal Utah Temple	→ Preston England Temple

Additional information
- Announced: February 13, 1994, by Ezra Taft Benson
- Groundbreaking: May 13, 1995, by Gordon B. Hinckley
- Open house: October 11–25, 1997
- Designed by: FFKR Architects
- Location: Vernal, Utah, United States
- Coordinates: 40°27′11.53799″N 109°32′14.68680″W
- Exterior finish: Face brick
- Design: Adaptation of Uintah Stake Tabernacle
- Baptistries: 1
- Ordinance rooms: 2 (Movie, two-stage progressive)
- Sealing rooms: 3
- Clothing rental: Yes

The Vernal Utah Temple is the fifty-first temple of the Church of Jesus Christ of Latter-day Saints, and is located in Vernal, Utah. The intent to build the temple was announced on February 13, 1994, by the church's First Presidency. It is the tenth temple in Utah.

When it was dedicated on November 2, 1997, the Vernal Utah Temple was unique as the church's only one built from a previously existing structure. Since 1997, the Copenhagen Denmark, Manhattan New York, and Provo City Center temples have been similarly adapted from existing structures. The temple has two domed towers, with the east tower having a gold-leafed statue of the angel Moroni. This temple was designed by FFKR Architects, using an adaptation of the Uintah Stake Tabernacle's original design.

A groundbreaking ceremony, signifying the beginning of construction, was held on May 13, 1995, conducted by church president Gordon B. Hinckley.

== History ==
Originally, the building served as the Uintah Stake Tabernacle for Latter-day Saints in eastern Utah. The tabernacle's foundation was constructed of nearby sandstone with walls built of four layers of fired brick from local clay. The building was built with considerable donated labor from the fall of 1899 until it was dedicated on August 24, 1907, by church president Joseph F. Smith, who reportedly said he would not be surprised if a temple was built there in the future.

Relative to other church tabernacles, the Uintah Stake Tabernacle was relatively modest, lacking the decorative details found on tabernacles in central and northern Utah.

By 1948, the tabernacle was superseded by an adjacent, more modern stake center. Only used irregularly thereafter, the church announced the tabernacle's closure the same year for public safety reasons, while also citing a lack of indoor bathrooms and accessibility for individuals with disabilities.

A local "Save the Tabernacle" committee was formed, and in 1989 a preservation study was conducted. The church ultimately decided to turn the building into a temple, announcing the decision in 1994. The renovation project preserved the buildings original exterior, while bringing it up to modern building codes and reconfiguring the interior floor plan. The temple's eastern spire was heightened to be taller than the spire of the adjacent stake center, and a golden statue of the angel Moroni was placed on top of the spire facing east.

Following completion of the temple, a public open house was held from October 11 to October 25, 1997. The temple was officially dedicated on November 2, 1997, by church president Gordon B. Hinckley, with the dedication lasting until November 4th, totaling 11 sessions.

Serving from 1997 to 1999, the temple's first president was Alva C. Snow, with Jean O. Snow serving as matron. As of 2023, Keith B. Caldwell is the president, with Rahnene Caldwell serving as matron.

== Design and architecture ==
The temple is on a 1.6-acre plot at 420 West 200 South in Vernal, Utah. Its grounds are landscaped with trees and flowerbeds.

The temple is a two-story structure, constructed with face brick that maintains the original tabernacle's appearance. The temple is distinguished by two domed towers, with the east tower having a gold-leafed statue of the angel Moroni. A stained-glass window depicting Jesus holding a lamb is on the east side of the temple.

The temple's interior includes hand-painted walls featuring sego lilies and wheat stalks, reflecting local vegetation. The furniture was designed to replicate early 20th-century designs, honoring the building’s pioneer heritage. The celestial room contains horsehair-upholstered furniture, similar to chairs used by the Quorum of the Twelve Apostles in the Salt Lake Temple.

== Admittance ==
On March 29, 1997, the First Presidency announced the public open house that was held from October 11 to October 25, 1997, excluding Sundays. The temple was dedicated by Gordon B. Hinckley from November 2 to November 4, 1997, in 11 sessions.

Like all the church's temples, it is not used for Sunday worship services. To members of the church, temples are regarded as sacred houses of the Lord. Once dedicated, only church members with a current temple recommend can enter for worship.

== See also ==
Temples in Utah
Wasatch Front Temples
Temples along the Wasatch Front
- = Operating
- = Under construction
- = Announced
- = Temporarily Closed

- The Church of Jesus Christ of Latter-day Saints in Utah
- Comparison of temples of The Church of Jesus Christ of Latter-day Saints
- List of temples of The Church of Jesus Christ of Latter-day Saints
- List of temples of The Church of Jesus Christ of Latter-day Saints by geographic region
- Temple architecture (Latter-day Saints)

== Additional reading ==
- "Uintah County", Utah Properties Listed in the National Register of Historic Places (PDF), Utah State History (agency), Utah Department of Heritage and Arts, March 18, 2009, p. 32, archived from the original (PDF) on February 19, 2012, "[D]etermined eligible, not formally listed because of owner objection"
- Jackson, Roger P. (1998), "Building of the Vernal Utah Temple", Utah Preservation, 2: 11–18
- Irving, Kathleen M.; Barton, John D. (1998), From Tabernacle to Temple: the story of the Vernal Utah Temple, Vernal, Utah: S.T. Tabernacle Enterprises, OCLC 41124283
- Starling, Robert (1994), A Monument to Faith (VHS videocassette), LDS Church, OCLC 367545981. Additional information from Mormon Literature & Creative Arts.
- "Vernal citizens begin drive to save tabernacle", Deseret News, pp. B1, B8, June 5, 1984
- "Uintah Stake Tabernacle Dedicated", Vernal Express, vol. 16, no. 35, pp. 1, 3, August 30, 1907
- "Uintah Stake Tabernacle to be dedicated tomorrow", Deseret Evening News, p. 27, August 24, 1907
- "Dedication of Tabernacle", Vernal Express, vol. 16, no. 34, p. 1, August 23, 1907
