= Provo Temple =

The Provo Temple may refer to one of two temples of the Church of Jesus Christ of Latter-day Saints:

- Provo Utah Temple, formerly officially called the Provo Temple and soon to be renamed the Provo Utah Rock Canyon Temple.
- Provo City Center Temple
