= Provo City Center Temple =

Latter-day Saint temple in Provo, Utah, United States

- Interactive map of Provo City Center Temple
- Number: 150
- Dedication: March 20, 2016, by Dallin H. Oaks
- Site: 5.6 acres (2.3 ha)
- Floor area: 85,084 ft^{2} (7,904.6 m^{2})
- Height: 150 ft (46 m)
- Official website • News & images

Church chronology
← Tijuana Mexico Temple	Provo City Center Temple	→ Sapporo Japan Temple

Additional information
- Announced: October 1, 2011, by Thomas S. Monson
- Groundbreaking: May 12, 2012, by Jeffrey R. Holland
- Open house: Friday, January 15, 2016-Saturday, March 5, 2016
- Current president: Curtis John Hoehne
- Location: Provo, Utah, U.S.
- Coordinates: 40°13′56.9424″N 111°39′32.2992″W
- Baptistries: 1
- Ordinance rooms: 3 (Two-stage progressive)
- Sealing rooms: 5
- Clothing rental: Yes

The Provo City Center Temple is a temple of the Church of Jesus Christ of Latter-day Saints, built on the site of the former Provo Tabernacle in Provo, Utah. Completed in 2016, the temple uses much of the external shell of the tabernacle that remained from the original building after a fire in December 2010. The intent to build the temple was announced on October 1, 2011, by church president Thomas S. Monson, during general conference. The temple is the second in Provo, was the sixteenth in Utah, and the church's 150th worldwide. This temple has a distinctive exterior with Gothic-inspired stained glass windows. A groundbreaking ceremony, to signify the beginning of construction, was held on May 12, 2012, conducted by Jeffrey R. Holland.

== History ==
The intent to construct the temple was announced by church president Thomas S. Monson on October 1, 2011, during the church's general conference. The temple was announced concurrently with those to be built in Barranquilla, Colombia; Durban, South Africa; Kinshasa, DR Congo; and Star Valley, Wyoming, along with the temple in Paris, France which had been previously announced. At the time, this brought the total number of temples worldwide (either completed, under construction or announced) to 166 and the number of temples in Utah to 16. Provo became the second city to have two of the church's temples, after South Jordan, Utah, with the Jordan River and Oquirrh Mountain temples. It is the second tabernacle in Utah to be converted to a temple, after the one in Vernal, Utah, and the fourth temple converted from an existing building. (The three previous were the Vernal Utah, Copenhagen Denmark, and Manhattan New York temples.) It is one of only two of the church's temples not to include the name of the state/province or country where it is located (the other being the Salt Lake Temple).

Following the temple announcement, Brigham Young University partnered with staff from the Church History Department to conduct an excavation of the temple site. The remains of the original meetinghouse were discovered in 2011 with the use of a ground-penetrating radar study, and in 2012 an archaeological excavation was undertaken in order to fully investigate the remains of the building. The excavation uncovered the foundation and basement of the structure, in which numerous artifacts were also recovered. Prior to the groundbreaking ceremony, the foundation was removed and donated to the city of Provo.

In addition to the archaeological work done on the site, the church and the architects prepared to design and build the temple by conducting in-depth research on the Provo Tabernacle as well as other buildings designed by the same architect, including the Manti Utah Temple, and other examples of Victorian-style architecture and interior design.

The groundbreaking ceremony took place on May 12, 2012, marking the commencement of construction, with Jeffrey R. Holland presiding, and attended by local church members and community leaders.

During construction, the temple faced various challenges, including the fragility of the existing structure. In order to add two basement levels, the exterior was stabilized and placed on stilts while the ground underneath it was excavated. Following its completion, a public open house was held from January 15 through March 5, 2016, excluding Sundays.

The temple was dedicated on March 20, 2016, by Dallin H. Oaks of the Quorum of the Twelve Apostles. Russell M. Nelson, the president of the Quorum of the Twelve Apostles, was in attendance at one of the three sessions. Also in attendance at one or more sessions were M. Russell Ballard and Gary E. Stevenson, both of the Quorum of the Twelve.

== Design and architecture ==
While keeping the exterior style of the Provo Tabernacle, the interior of the building was redesigned for its new function. Its architecture reflects both the cultural heritage of the Provo region and its spiritual significance to the church. The changes to the interior were drawn from themes from Victorian architecture from several of the region's historic buildings including the Gardo House, the Utah Governor's Mansion, and the Salt Lake Assembly Hall. Stained glass from the original tabernacle was used in the reconstruction.

=== Site ===
The temple sits on a 5.6-acre plot, and the landscaping around the temple features gathering and contemplation spaces. The grounds also contain a pavilion with a replica of the Christus statue for visitors and wedding guests to wait in. These elements are designed to provide a tranquil setting that enhances the sacred atmosphere of the site.

Exterior The structure stands 150 feet tall, constructed with brick. The exterior is characterized by red sandstone brick, arched stained glass windows, blue conical towers, and blue gable roofs, elements which were each chosen for their symbolic significance and alignment with temple traditions. The design incorporates elements that are reflective of both the local culture and broader church symbolism.

Interior The interior features a Victorian design theme, reflecting the original Provo Tabernacle. The interior is decorated with a flower motif, African mahogany, and walnut wood, as well as repurposed design elements from the Provo Tabernacle that survived the fire. The main entrance features “an early-1900s stained-glass depiction of Christ, reclaimed from a demolished Presbyterian church in New York.” The temple includes three instruction rooms, five sealing rooms, and one baptistry, each purposefully arranged for ceremonial use. Symbolic elements are integrated into the design, providing deeper meaning to the temple's function and aesthetics.

Symbols Symbolism is important to church members. These include the temple itself, which is “a testament to the reality of spiritual rebirth and renewal through receiving and honoring temple covenants.” Another example of symbolism in the temple is the inclusion of the lotus flower in the interior’s floral motif. Lotus flowers have been an important religious symbol across the world for centuries, and often represent purity and rebirth.

== Cultural and community impact ==
The temple's site has been a gathering place for community events since the 1850s, when the first tabernacle was built. The Provo Tabernacle hosted numerous events, including religious conferences, graduations, funerals, and lectures; notable visitors included U.S. President William Howard Taft and composer Sergei Rachmaninoff. These events highlight the tabernacle's role in creating a sense of community and promoting mutual understanding among residents of diverse backgrounds.

When the Provo Tabernacle was destroyed by a fire in 2010, local residents mourned the loss of the landmark. The announcement that the structure would be rebuilt as a temple was met with excitement from church members. Prior to the temple’s dedication, a cultural celebration was held, during which over 4,500 local young church members performed. It featured dance and song performances about themes relevant to the new temple and the history of the tabernacle, such as “pioneer history, personal sacrifice, patriotism, the arts, and service.”

== Temple presidents ==
The church's temples are directed by a temple president and matron, each serving for a term of three years. The president and matron oversee the administration of temple operations and provide guidance and training for both temple patrons and staff.

The first president of the Provo City Center Temple was Allen C. Ostergar Jr., with the matron being Nancy S. Ostergar. They served from 2016 to 2018. As of 2024, the president is Curtis Hoehne, with Joanne Hoehne serving as matron.

== Admittance ==
Following completion of the temple, a public open house was held from January 15-March 5, 2016 (excluding Sundays). During the open house, over 800,000 people visited the temple. The temple was dedicated by Dallin H. Oaks on March 20, 2016. Like all the church's temples, it is not used for Sunday worship services. To members of the church, temples are regarded as sacred houses of the Lord. Once dedicated, only church members with a current temple recommend can enter for worship.

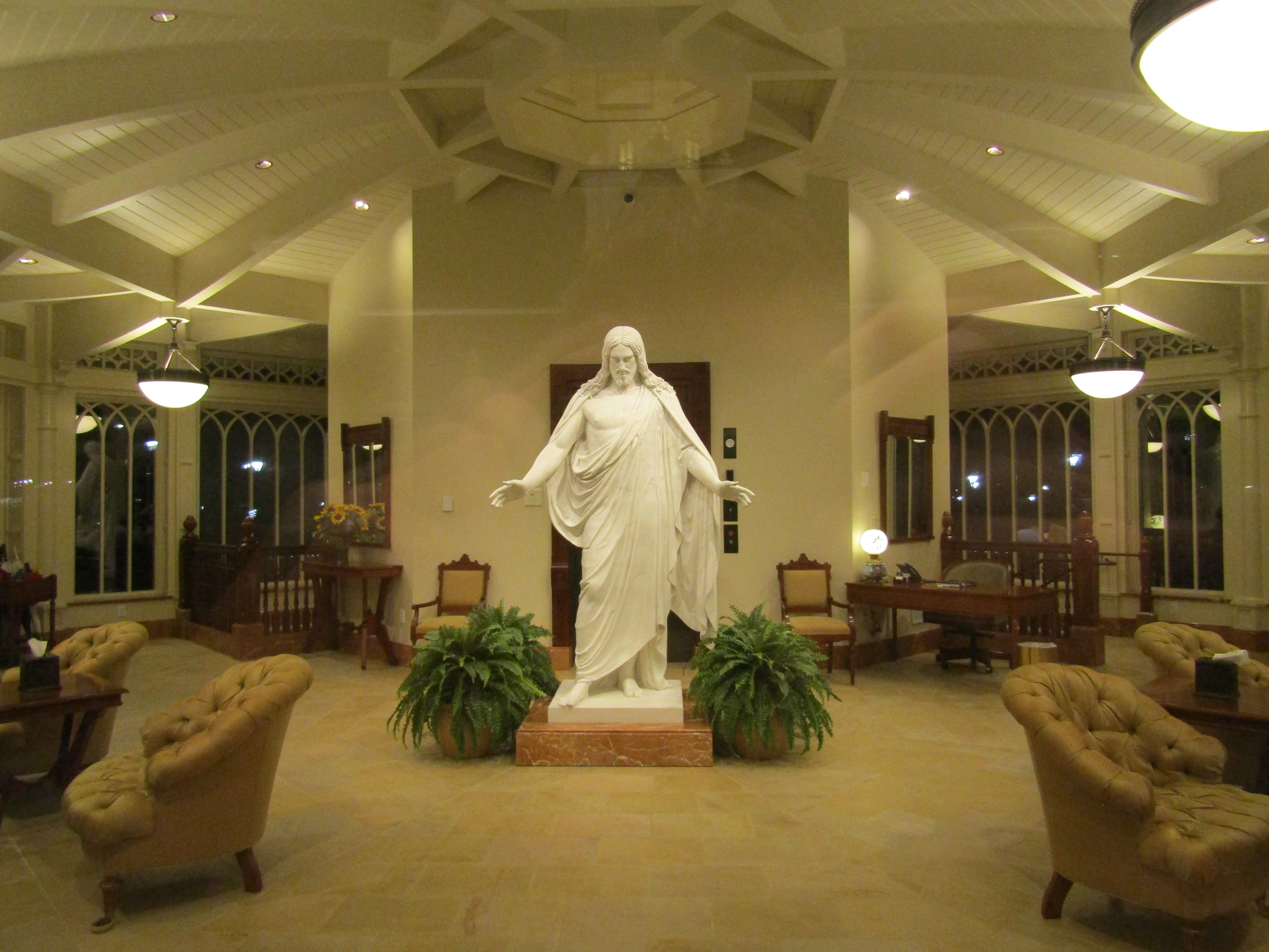
Interior of Pavilion on Provo City Center Temple grounds.

== See also ==
Temples in Utah
Wasatch Front Temples
Temples along the Wasatch Front
- = Operating
- = Under construction
- = Announced
- = Temporarily Closed

- The Church of Jesus Christ of Latter-day Saints in Utah
- Comparison of temples (LDS Church)
- List of temples (LDS Church)
- List of temples by geographic region (LDS Church)
- Temple architecture (LDS Church)
