= The Church of Jesus Christ of Latter-day Saints in Utah =

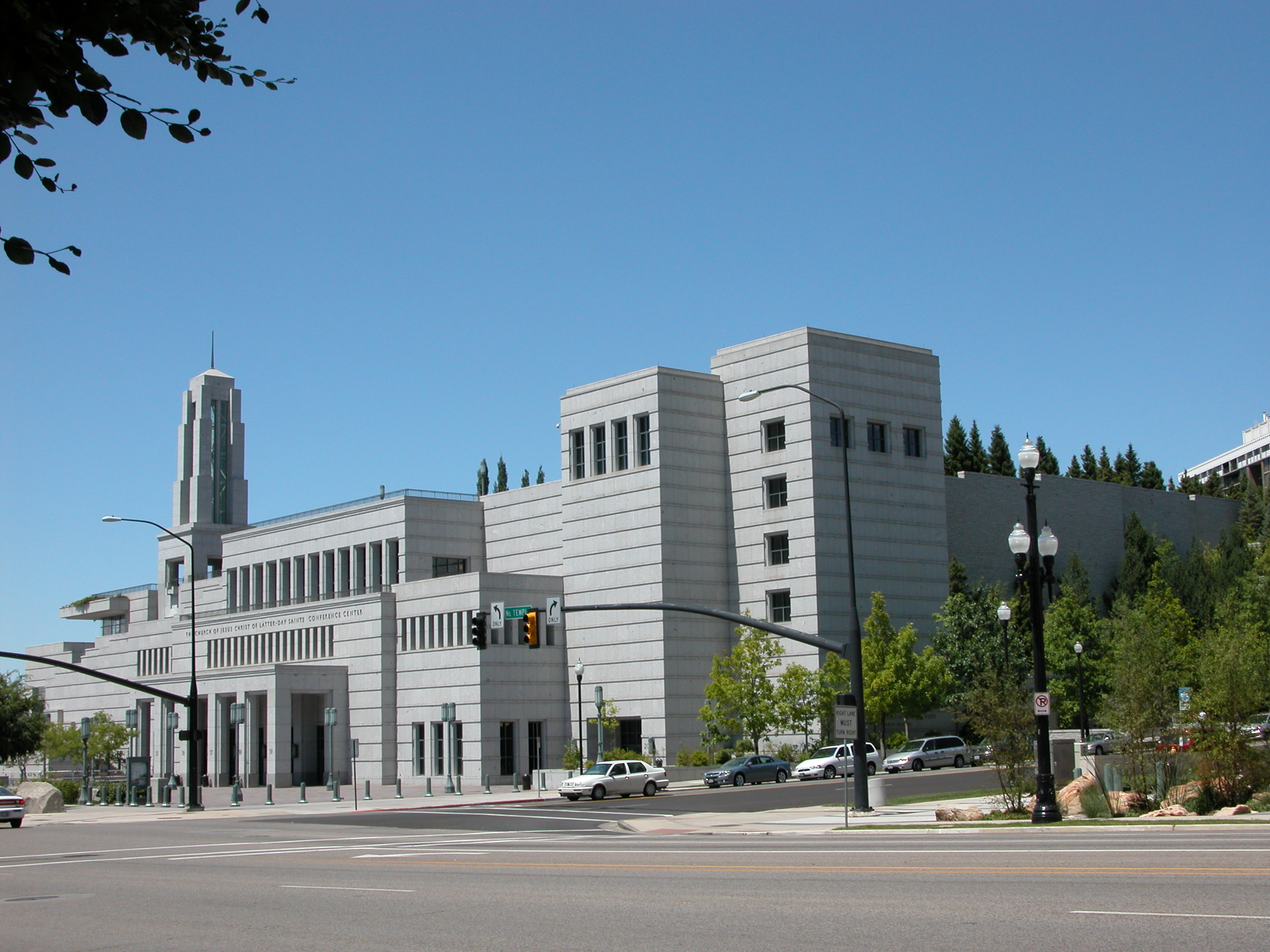
- LDS Conference Center
- Area: Utah
- Members: 2,206,370 (2025)
- Stakes: 647
- Districts: 7
- Wards: 5,046
- Branches: 319
- Total Congregations: 5,365
- Missions: 13
- Temples: 24 operating 4 under construction 4 announced 32 total
- FamilySearch Centers: 170

The Church of Jesus Christ of Latter-day Saints (LDS Church) has more church members in Utah than any other U.S. state or country. The LDS Church is also the largest denomination in Utah.

== History ==
=== Membership history ===
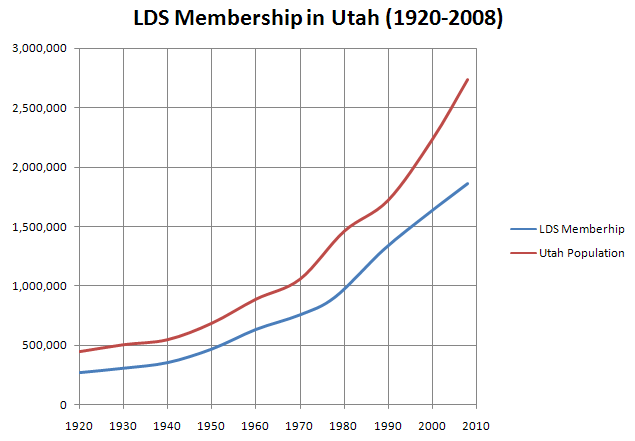
Utah LDS membership

Historically, the percentage of Utahns who are Latter-day Saints was constantly increasing and went from six-tenths in 1920 to three-fourths in 1990, however, since then the proportion has decreased even though the number of church members has grown nominally. Much of this is due to the rise of secularism in the state, despite rapid population growth. In 2008, the US Census Bureau determined Utah to be the fastest growing state in the country in terms of population growth.

Year	Membership
1920	272,000
1930	309,400
1940	356,500
1950	470,400
1960	634,600
1970	757,100
1978	907,866
1989	1,305,000
1999	1,604,686
2009	1,884,337
2019	2,126,216
2025	2,206,370

== County statistics ==
Percent Latter-day Saint by Utah county as of 2021 Legend: 70-74%; 65-69%; 60-64%; 55-59%; 50-54%; 45-49%; 40-44%; 35-39%

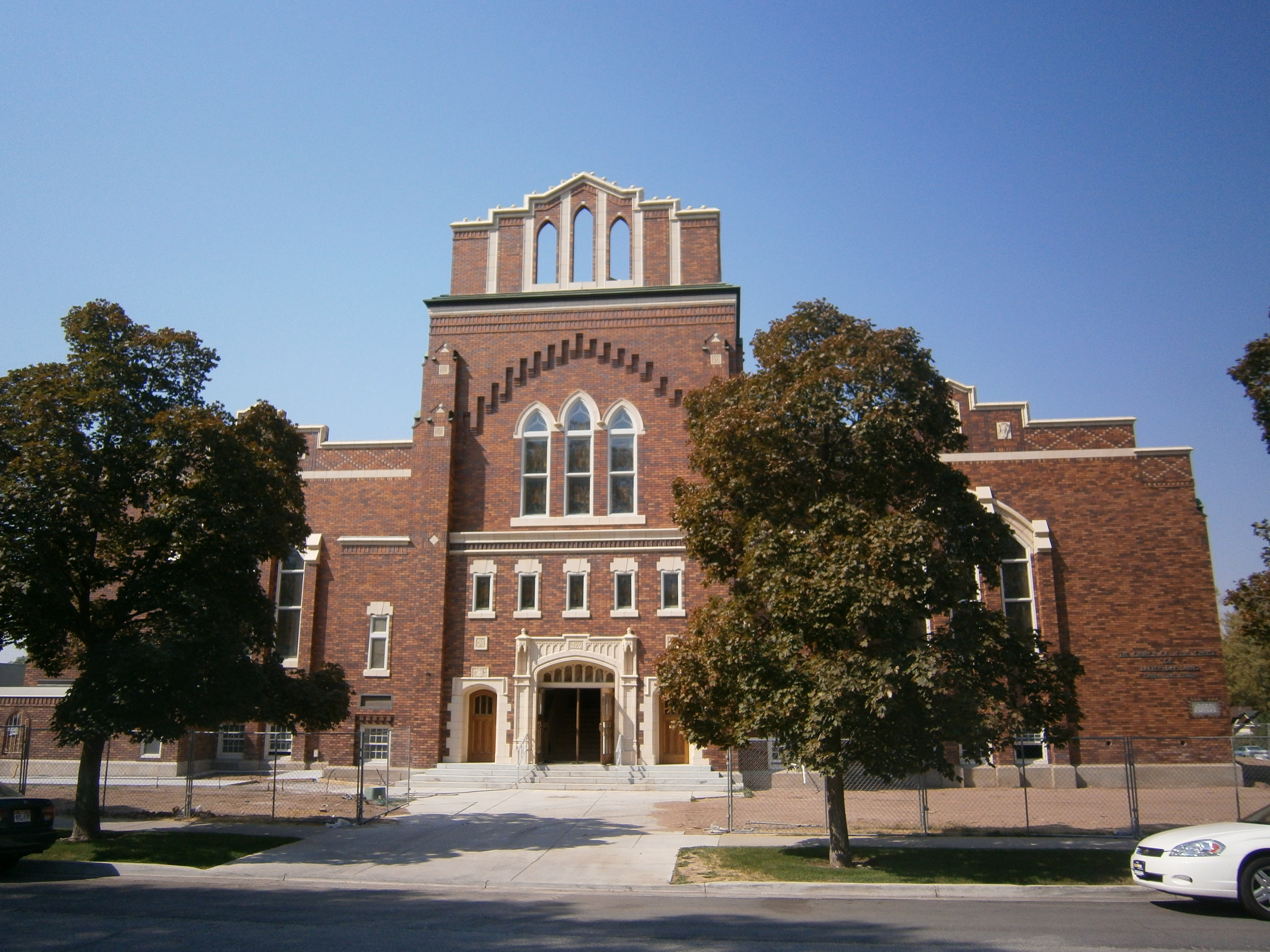
A meetinghouse in Ogden

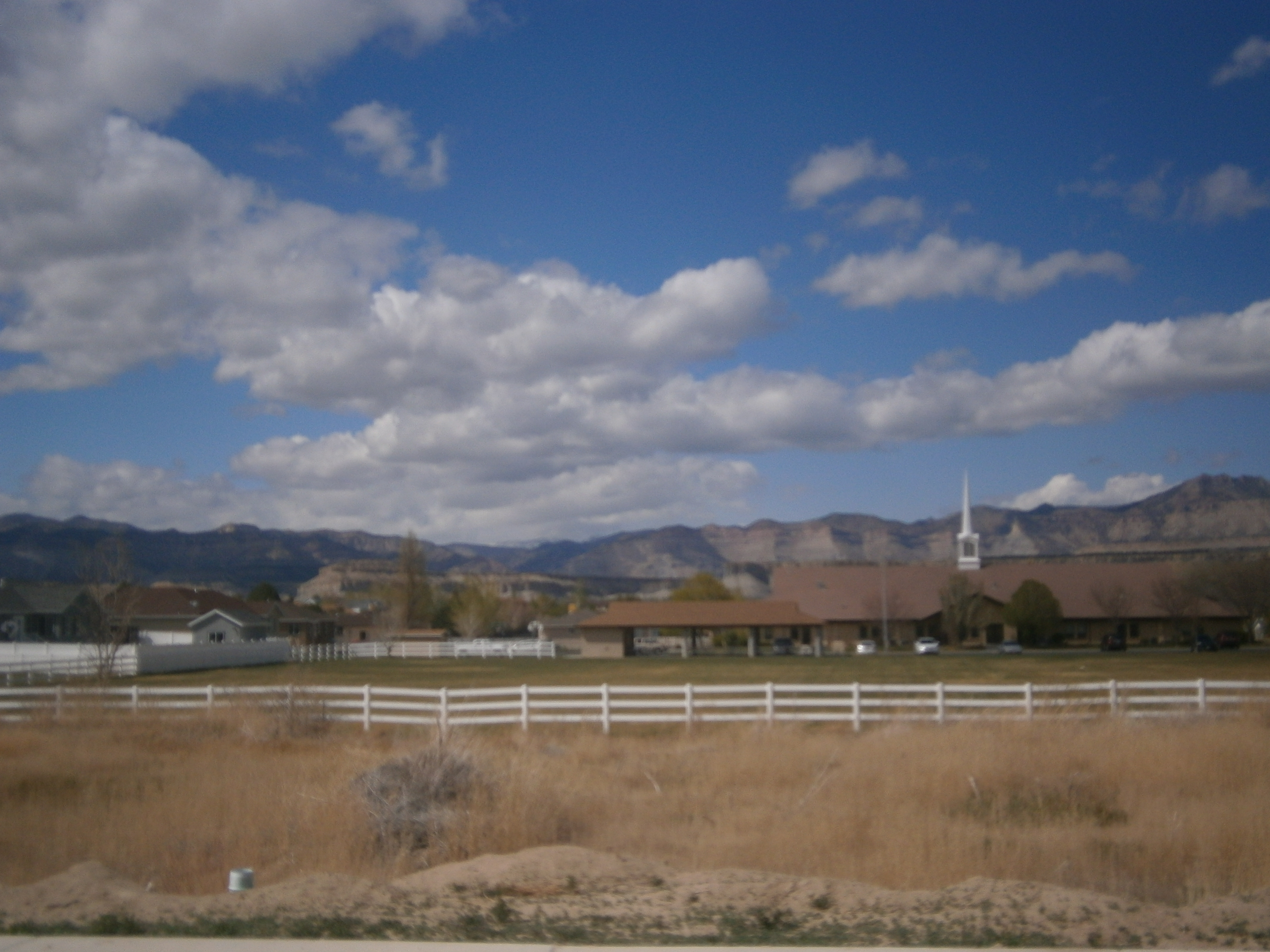
A meetinghouse in West Wood

List of LDS Church adherents in each county as of 2010 according to the Association of Religion Data Archives:

County	Congregations	Adherents	% of Population
Beaver	15	4,965	74.9
Box Elder	103	40,668	81.4
Cache	285	92,665	82.3
Carbon	31	11,367	53.1
Daggett	3	695	65.6
Davis	550	228,813	74.7
Duchesne	33	13,676	73.5
Emery	22	8,483	77.3
Garfield	15	3,781	73.1
Grand	8	2,869	31.1
Iron	96	31,883	69.1
Juab	19	8,373	81.7
Kane	12	4,117	57.8
Millard	27	9,909	79.3
Morgan	22	8,418	88.9
Piute	3	1,036	66.6
Rich	6	1,992	88.0
Salt Lake	1,400	610,846	59.3
San Juan	22	6,490	44.0
Sanpete	65	21,957	78.9
Sevier	39	17,392	83.6
Summit	30	12,704	35.0
Tooele	87	38,888	66.8
Uintah	47	20,349	62.4
Utah	1,297	457,999	88.7
Wasatch	39	15,172	64.5
Washington	239	94,191	68.2
Wayne	6	2,158	77.7
Weber	314	138,648	60.0

== Stakes and districts ==
As of September 2026, Utah had the following stakes and districts:

Stake/District	Organized	Mission	Temple
Alpine Utah North Stake	23 Jun 1996	Utah Orem	Mount Timpanogos Utah
Alpine Utah Stake	13 Jan 1901	Utah Orem	Mount Timpanogos Utah
Alpine Utah West Stake	1 Jun 2003	Utah Orem	Mount Timpanogos Utah
Alpine Utah YSA Stake	5 Jun 2011	Utah Orem	Mount Timpanogos Utah
Altamont Utah Stake	21 Apr 1985	Utah Provo	Vernal Utah
American Fork Utah Central Stake	23 Apr 1995	Utah Orem	Mount Timpanogos Utah
American Fork Utah East Stake	29 Apr 1979	Utah Orem	Mount Timpanogos Utah
American Fork Utah Harbor Stake	10 Sep 2023	Utah Orem	Mount Timpanogos Utah
American Fork Utah Hillcrest Stake	14 Jan 1996	Utah Orem	Mount Timpanogos Utah
American Fork Utah North Stake	17 Jun 1973	Utah Orem	Mount Timpanogos Utah
American Fork Utah South Stake	10 Dec 2017	Utah Orem	Mount Timpanogos Utah
American Fork Utah Stake	12 May 1963	Utah Orem	Mount Timpanogos Utah
American Fork Utah West Stake	14 Dec 1980	Utah Orem	Mount Timpanogos Utah
Beaver Utah Stake	12 Mar 1869	Utah Spanish Fork	Cedar City Utah
Bennion Utah East Stake	29 Jan 1984	Utah Salt Lake City West	Taylorsville Utah
Bennion Utah Stake	27 Oct 1974	Utah Salt Lake City West	Taylorsville Utah
Bennion Utah West Stake	30 Oct 1977	Utah Salt Lake City West	Taylorsville Utah
Benson Utah Stake	7 May 1978	Utah Ogden	Logan Utah
Blanding Utah Stake	5 Mar 1978	New Mexico Farmington	Monticello Utah
Bloomington Utah Stake	6 Mar 1988	Utah St George	St. George Utah
Bluffdale Utah Independence Stake	25 Feb 2018	Utah Salt Lake City South	Jordan River Utah
Bluffdale Utah South Stake	20 Apr 2014	Utah Salt Lake City South	Jordan River Utah
Bluffdale Utah Stake	10 Mar 1985	Utah Salt Lake City South	Jordan River Utah
Bountiful Utah Central Stake	10 Jan 1971	Utah Salt Lake City	Bountiful Utah
Bountiful Utah East Stake	29 Sep 1963	Utah Salt Lake City	Bountiful Utah
Bountiful Utah Heights Stake	16 May 1971	Utah Salt Lake City	Bountiful Utah
Bountiful Utah Mueller Park Stake	27 Apr 1980	Utah Salt Lake City	Bountiful Utah
Bountiful Utah North Canyon Stake	9 Nov 1980	Utah Salt Lake City	Bountiful Utah
Bountiful Utah North Stake	20 Apr 1958	Utah Salt Lake City	Bountiful Utah
Bountiful Utah Orchard Stake	20 Jun 1915	Utah Salt Lake City	Bountiful Utah
Bountiful Utah South Stake	20 Apr 1958	Utah Salt Lake City	Bountiful Utah
Bountiful Utah Stake	23 Mar 1952	Utah Salt Lake City	Bountiful Utah
Bountiful Utah Stone Creek Stake	24 May 1981	Utah Salt Lake City	Bountiful Utah
Bountiful Utah Val Verda Stake	25 Jan 1970	Utah Salt Lake City	Bountiful Utah
Bountiful Utah YSA Stake	1 May 2011	Utah Salt Lake City	Bountiful Utah
Brigham City Utah Box Elder Stake	12 Nov 1944	Utah Ogden	Brigham City Utah
Brigham City Utah North Stake	12 Nov 1944	Utah Ogden	Brigham City Utah
Brigham City Utah South Stake	28 Apr 1963	Utah Ogden	Brigham City Utah
Brigham City Utah Stake	22 Sep 1963	Utah Ogden	Brigham City Utah
Brigham City Utah West Stake	8 Mar 1981	Utah Ogden	Brigham City Utah
Castle Dale Utah Stake	1 Aug 1880	Utah Spanish Fork	Manti Utah
Cedar City Utah Canyon View Stake	18 Feb 1996	Utah St George	Cedar City Utah
Cedar City Utah Cross Hollow Stake	16 Mar 2008	Utah St George	Cedar City Utah
Cedar City Utah Married Student Stake	21 Mar 1999	Utah St George	Cedar City Utah
Cedar City Utah North Stake	19 Mar 1978	Utah St George	Cedar City Utah
Cedar City Utah South Stake	3 Nov 2024	Utah St George	Cedar City Utah
Cedar City Utah Stake	2 May 1948	Utah St George	Cedar City Utah
Cedar City Utah West Stake	27 Nov 1960	Utah St George	Cedar City Utah
Cedar City Utah YSA 1st Stake	6 Jan 1966	Utah St George	Cedar City Utah
Cedar City Utah YSA 2nd Stake	30 Apr 1995	Utah St George	Cedar City Utah
Cedar Hills Utah Stake	7 Jan 2001	Utah Orem	Mount Timpanogos Utah
Cedar Hills Utah West Stake	6 Nov 2005	Utah Orem	Mount Timpanogos Utah
Centerville Utah Canyon View Stake	12 May 1991	Utah Layton	Bountiful Utah
Centerville Utah North Stake	11 Apr 1982	Utah Layton	Bountiful Utah
Centerville Utah South Stake	9 Apr 1978	Utah Layton	Bountiful Utah
Centerville Utah Stake	21 May 1972	Utah Layton	Bountiful Utah
Central Valley Utah Stake	25 Aug 2019	Utah Spanish Fork	Manti Utah
Clearfield Utah North Stake	8 Oct 1978	Utah Layton	Syracuse Utah
Clearfield Utah South Stake	9 Feb 1997	Utah Layton	Syracuse Utah
Clearfield Utah Stake	12 Apr 1959	Utah Layton	Syracuse Utah
Clinton Utah North Stake	15 Apr 1984	Utah Layton	Syracuse Utah
Clinton Utah Stake	9 Nov 1975	Utah Layton	Syracuse Utah
Clinton Utah West Stake	10 Apr 2011	Utah Layton	Syracuse Utah
Coalville Utah Stake	9 Jul 1877	Utah Salt Lake City	Ogden Utah
Cottonwood Heights Utah Brighton Stake	4 Mar 1973	Utah Salt Lake City East	Salt Lake
Cottonwood Heights Utah Butler Stake	18 Nov 1962	Utah Salt Lake City East	Salt Lake
Delta Utah Stake	11 Aug 1912	Utah Saratoga Springs	Payson Utah
Delta Utah West Stake	23 Sep 1979	Utah Saratoga Springs	Payson Utah
Draper Utah Corner Canyon Stake	7 Dec 1997	Utah Salt Lake City East	Draper Utah
Draper Utah Crescent View Stake	17 Nov 1996	Utah Salt Lake City East	Jordan River Utah
Draper Utah Eastridge Stake	6 Dec 1981	Utah Salt Lake City East	Draper Utah
Draper Utah Meadows Stake	3 May 2015	Utah Salt Lake City East	Draper Utah
Draper Utah Mountain Point Stake	30 Apr 2006	Utah Salt Lake City East	Draper Utah
Draper Utah River View Stake	27 Apr 2003	Utah Salt Lake City East	Jordan River Utah
Draper Utah South Mountain Stake	10 Nov 2002	Utah Salt Lake City East	Draper Utah
Draper Utah Stake	3 May 1942	Utah Salt Lake City East	Draper Utah
Draper Utah Suncrest Stake	17 Aug 2014	Utah Salt Lake City East	Draper Utah
Draper Utah YSA Stake	1 May 2011	Utah Salt Lake City East	Draper Utah
Duchesne Utah Stake	14 Sep 1910	Utah Provo	Vernal Utah
Eagle Mountain Utah Brandon Park Stake	30 Aug 2026	Utah Saratoga Springs	Saratoga Springs Utah
Eagle Mountain Utah Central Stake	9 Oct 2011	Utah Saratoga Springs	Saratoga Springs Utah
Eagle Mountain Utah Eagle Valley Stake	24 Apr 2022	Utah Saratoga Springs	Saratoga Springs Utah
Eagle Mountain Utah East Stake	13 Mar 2005	Utah Saratoga Springs	Saratoga Springs Utah
Eagle Mountain Utah Nolen Park Stake	27 Aug 2017	Utah Saratoga Springs	Saratoga Springs Utah
Eagle Mountain Utah North Stake	25 Apr 2010	Utah Saratoga Springs	Saratoga Springs Utah
Eagle Mountain Utah Porter's Crossing Stake	16 Apr 2023	Utah Saratoga Springs	Saratoga Springs Utah
Eagle Mountain Utah Silver Lake Stake	25 Oct 2015	Utah Saratoga Springs	Saratoga Springs Utah
Eagle Mountain Utah Stake	27 Feb 2000	Utah Saratoga Springs	Saratoga Springs Utah
Eagle Mountain Utah Sweetwater Stake	2 Jun 2024	Utah Saratoga Springs	Saratoga Springs Utah
Eagle Mountain Utah Valley View Stake	16 Mar 2014	Utah Saratoga Springs	Saratoga Springs Utah
Eagle Mountain Utah West Stake	22 Sep 2002	Utah Saratoga Springs	Saratoga Springs Utah
Elk Ridge Utah Stake	19 May 2002	Utah Saratoga Springs	Payson Utah
Elk Ridge Utah West Stake	16 Nov 2025	Utah Saratoga Springs	Payson Utah
Ely Nevada Stake (Note: Stake located outside Utah with congregation(s) meeting in Utah)	19 Sep 1926	Nevada Reno	Elko Nevada
Enoch Utah Stake	20 Oct 1985	Utah St George	Cedar City Utah
Enoch Utah West Stake	19 Jun 2011	Utah St George	Cedar City Utah
Enterprise Utah Stake	15 Dec 1940	Utah St George	St. George Utah
Ephraim Utah Stake	24 Mar 1985	Utah Spanish Fork	Manti Utah
Ephraim Utah YSA 1st Stake	24 Mar 1985	Utah Spanish Fork	Manti Utah
Ephraim Utah YSA 2nd Stake	28 Apr 1996	Utah Spanish Fork	Manti Utah
Erda Utah Stake	22 Feb 2015	Utah Salt Lake City West	Deseret Peak Utah
Escalante Utah Stake	29 Aug 1920	Utah Spanish Fork	Cedar City Utah
Farmington Utah Farmington Bay Stake	25 Oct 2020	Utah Layton	Bountiful Utah
Farmington Utah North Stake	16 May 1982	Utah Layton	Bountiful Utah
Farmington Utah Oakridge Stake	19 Aug 1990	Utah Layton	Bountiful Utah
Farmington Utah South Stake	13 May 1990	Utah Layton	Bountiful Utah
Farmington Utah Stake	14 Oct 1945	Utah Layton	Bountiful Utah
Farmington Utah West Stake	6 Nov 2011	Utah Layton	Bountiful Utah
Farr West Utah Poplar Stake	14 Jun 2009	Utah Ogden	Ogden Utah
Farr West Utah Stake	3 Dec 2000	Utah Ogden	Ogden Utah
Ferron Utah Stake	11 Apr 1982	Utah Spanish Fork	Manti Utah
Fielding Utah Stake	12 May 1985	Utah Ogden	Brigham City Utah
Fillmore Utah Stake	9 Mar 1869	Utah Spanish Fork	Manti Utah
Fort Herriman Utah Stake	27 Jun 2004	Utah Salt Lake City South	Oquirrh Mountain Utah
Fruit Heights Utah Stake	27 Oct 1985	Utah Layton	Layton Utah
Garland Utah Stake	11 Oct 1908	Utah Ogden	Brigham City Utah
Goshen Utah Stake	18 Apr 1999	Utah Saratoga Springs	Payson Utah
Grantsville Utah Stake	16 Jan 1944	Utah Salt Lake City West	Deseret Peak Utah
Grantsville Utah West Stake	23 Sep 1979	Utah Salt Lake City West	Deseret Peak Utah
Great Basin Utah District (Correctional Facility)	29 Aug 2024		
Great Salt Lake Utah District (Correctional Facility)	3 Jan 2021		
Green River Basin Utah District (Correctional Facility)	1 Sep 2024		
Green River Wyoming Stake	23 Sep 1984	Wyoming Cheyanne	Vernal Utah
Gunnison Utah Stake	6 May 1923	Utah Spanish Fork	Manti Utah
Harrisville Utah Stake	23 Sep 1984	Utah Ogden	Ogden Utah
Heber City Utah East Stake	16 Jun 1974	Utah Provo	Provo Utah Rock Canyon
Heber City Utah North Stake	18 Jan 2004	Utah Provo	Provo Utah Rock Canyon
Heber City Utah Old Mill Stake	6 Jun 2021	Utah Provo	Provo Utah Rock Canyon
Heber City Utah Stake	15 Jul 1877	Utah Provo	Provo Utah Rock Canyon
Herriman Utah Anthem Stake	31 Jan 2021	Utah Salt Lake City South	Oquirrh Mountain Utah
Herriman Utah Blackridge Stake	23 Feb 2020	Utah Salt Lake City South	Oquirrh Mountain Utah
Herriman Utah Butterfield Canyon Stake	26 Jan 2003	Utah Salt Lake City South	Oquirrh Mountain Utah
Herriman Utah Mirabella Stake	14 Jan 2024	Utah Salt Lake City South	Oquirrh Mountain Utah
Herriman Utah Mountain Ridge Stake	22 May 2022	Utah Salt Lake City South	Oquirrh Mountain Utah
Herriman Utah Mountain View Stake	23 Feb 2014	Utah Salt Lake City South	Oquirrh Mountain Utah
Herriman Utah Pioneer Stake	18 Jan 2015	Utah Salt Lake City South	Oquirrh Mountain Utah
Herriman Utah Rose Canyon Stake	28 Jan 2006	Utah Salt Lake City South	Oquirrh Mountain Utah
Herriman Utah South Stake	28 Jan 2006	Utah Salt Lake City South	Oquirrh Mountain Utah
Herriman Utah Stake	28 Jun 1998	Utah Salt Lake City South	Oquirrh Mountain Utah
Herriman Utah Towne Center Stake	24 Nov 2019	Utah Salt Lake City South	Oquirrh Mountain Utah
Highland Utah Central Stake	3 Nov 2013	Utah Saratoga Springs	Mount Timpanogos Utah
Highland Utah East Stake	10 Nov 1991	Utah Orem	Mount Timpanogos Utah
Highland Utah North Stake	3 Nov 2024	Utah Saratoga Spring	Mount Timpanogos Utah
Highland Utah South Stake	15 May 2005	Utah Saratoga Springs	Mount Timpanogos Utah
Highland Utah Stake	10 Aug 1980	Utah Orem	Mount Timpanogos Utah
Highland Utah West Stake	11 Nov 2001	Utah Saratoga Springs	Mount Timpanogos Utah
Hooper Utah Pioneer Trail Stake	15 Jun 2014	Utah Ogden	Ogden Utah
Hooper Utah Stake	22 Mar 1942	Utah Ogden	Ogden Utah
Huntington Utah Stake	23 Oct 1977	Utah Spanish Fork	Manti Utah
Huntsville Utah Stake	14 May 1978	Utah Ogden	Ogden Utah
Hurricane Utah North Stake	6 Jan 2019	Utah St George	Red Cliffs Utah
Hurricane Utah Sand Hollow Stake	10 Mar 1996	Utah St George	Red Cliffs Utah
Hurricane Utah Sky Mountain Stake	11 Jan 2026	Utah St George	Red Cliffs Utah
Hurricane Utah South Stake	30 Mar 2025	Utah St George	Red Cliffs Utah
Hurricane Utah Stake	8 Dec 1929	Utah St George	Red Cliffs Utah
Hyde Park Utah North Park Stake	27 Mar 2022	Utah Ogden	Logan Utah
Hyde Park Utah Stake	22 Sep 1985	Utah Ogden	Logan Utah
Hyrum Utah Central Stake	21 Jan 2024	Utah Ogden	Logan Utah
Hyrum Utah East Stake	5 Aug 1979	Utah Ogden	Logan Utah
Hyrum Utah West Stake	6 Jun 2021	Utah Ogden	Logan Utah
Ivins Utah Stake	11 Feb 1996	Utah St George	St. George Utah
Kamas Utah Stake	8 Jul 1934	Utah Provo	Salt Lake
Kanab Utah Kaibab Stake	3 May 1987	Utah St George	Red Cliffs Utah
Kanab Utah Stake	18 Apr 1877	Utah St George	Red Cliffs Utah
Kanesville Utah Stake	19 Apr 1987	Utah Ogden	Ogden Utah
Kaysville Utah Central Stake	24 Sep 1995	Utah Layton	Layton Utah
Kaysville Utah Crestwood Stake	13 May 1979	Utah Layton	Layton Utah
Kaysville Utah Deseret Mill Stake	16 Nov 2014	Utah Layton	Layton Utah
Kaysville Utah East Stake	27 Feb 1972	Utah Layton	Layton Utah
Kaysville Utah Haight Creek Stake	2 Nov 2003	Utah Layton	Layton Utah
Kaysville Utah South Stake	11 Mar 1979	Utah Layton	Layton Utah
Kaysville Utah Stake	18 Feb 1962	Utah Layton	Layton Utah
Kaysville Utah West Stake	4 Mar 2006	Utah Layton	Layton Utah
Kearns Utah North Stake	2 Feb 1958	Utah Salt Lake City West	Taylorsville Utah
Kearns Utah South Stake	25 Aug 1974	Utah Salt Lake City West	Taylorsville Utah
La Verkin Utah Stake	11 Oct 1981	Utah St George	Red Cliffs Utah
Lake Point Utah Stake	7 Feb 2021	Utah Salt Lake City West	Deseret Peak Utah
Layton Utah Creekside Stake	20 Apr 2003	Utah Layton	Layton Utah
Layton Utah East Stake	4 Feb 1968	Utah Layton	Layton Utah
Layton Utah Holmes Creek Stake	3 Sep 1978	Utah Layton	Layton Utah
Layton Utah Kays Creek Stake	11 Jun 1995	Utah Layton	Layton Utah
Layton Utah Layton Hills Stake	19 May 1996	Utah Layton	Layton Utah
Layton Utah Legacy Stake	17 Apr 2011	Utah Layton	Layton Utah
Layton Utah North Stake	5 May 1985	Utah Layton	Layton Utah
Layton Utah Northridge Stake	11 Oct 1987	Utah Layton	Layton Utah
Layton Utah Shoreline Stake	11 Oct 2020	Utah Layton	Layton Utah
Layton Utah South Stake	8 Feb 1987	Utah Layton	Layton Utah
Layton Utah Stake	25 Jan 1953	Utah Layton	Layton Utah
Layton Utah Valley View Stake	27 Jun 1993	Utah Layton	Layton Utah
Layton Utah West Stake	21 Aug 1977	Utah Layton	Layton Utah
Layton Utah YSA Stake	1 May 2011	Utah Layton	Layton Utah
Lehi Utah 3rd Stake (Tongan)	9 Jun 2024	Utah Orem	Saratoga Springs Utah
Lehi Utah Canyon Hills Stake	5 Sep 2021	Utah Saratoga Springs	Mount Timpanogos Utah
Lehi Utah Cedar Hollow Stake	2 May 2010	Utah Orem	Mount Timpanogos Utah
Lehi Utah Central Stake	27 Aug 2017	Utah Saratoga Springs	Saratoga Springs Utah
Lehi Utah Cold Spring Ranch Stake	19 Mar 2023	Utah Saratoga Springs	Saratoga Springs Utah
Lehi Utah East Stake	7 May 2000	Utah Orem	Mount Timpanogos Utah
Lehi Utah Gateway Stake	9 Sep 2006	Utah Saratoga Springs	Saratoga Springs Utah
Lehi Utah Hardman Farms Stake	8 Jun 2025	Utah Saratoga Springs	Saratoga Springs Utah
Lehi Utah Holbrook Farms Stake	31 Mar 2019	Utah Saratoga Springs	Saratoga Springs Utah
Lehi Utah Jordan River Stake	16 Mar 2003	Utah Saratoga Springs	Saratoga Springs Utah
Lehi Utah Jordan River YSA Stake	25 Oct 2020	Utah Saratoga Springs	Saratoga Springs Utah
Lehi Utah Jordan Willows Stake	24 Mar 2013	Utah Saratoga Springs	Saratoga Springs Utah
Lehi Utah Meadow View Stake	24 Apr 2022	Utah Saratoga Springs	Mount Timpanogos Utah
Lehi Utah North Lake Stake	29 Oct 2023	Utah Saratoga Springs	Saratoga Springs Utah
Lehi Utah North Stake	5 May 1974	Utah Orem	Mount Timpanogos Utah
Lehi Utah North YSA Stake	13 Apr 2025	Utah Saratoga Springs	Saratoga Springs Utah
Lehi Utah Pheasant Pointe Stake	17 Feb 2013	Utah Saratoga Springs	Mount Timpanogos Utah
Lehi Utah Snow Springs Stake	29 Oct 2023	Utah Saratoga Springs	Saratoga Springs Utah
Lehi Utah South Stake	18 Feb 1996	Utah Saratoga Springs	Saratoga Springs Utah
Lehi Utah Stake	1 Jul 1928	Utah Saratoga Springs	Saratoga Springs Utah
Lehi Utah Thanksgiving Stake	11 Oct 2015	Utah Saratoga Springs	Saratoga Springs Utah
Lehi Utah Traverse Mountain Stake	9 Sep 2006	Utah Saratoga Springs	Mount Timpanogos Utah
Lehi Utah West Stake	8 May 1983	Utah Saratoga Springs	Mount Timpanogos Utah
Lehi Utah Willow Creek Stake	1 Mar 2026	Utah Saratoga Springs	Saratoga Springs Utah
Lehi Utah Willow Park Stake	17 Feb 2008	Utah Saratoga Springs	Saratoga Springs Utah
Lehi Utah YSA Stake	24 Apr 2011	Utah Saratoga Springs	Mount Timpanogos Utah
Lewiston Utah Stake	24 Sep 2023	Utah Ogden	Logan Utah
Lindon Utah Central Stake	17 Aug 2002	Utah Orem	Lindon Utah
Lindon Utah Stake	12 Dec 1982	Utah Orem	Lindon Utah
Lindon Utah West Stake	20 Aug 1995	Utah Orem	Lindon Utah
Loa Utah Stake	27 May 1893	Utah Spanish Fork	Manti Utah
Logan Utah Cache Stake	21 May 1877	Utah Ogden	Logan Utah
Logan Utah Cache West Stake	22 May 1983	Utah Ogden	Logan Utah
Logan Utah Central Stake	8 Mar 1981	Utah Ogden	Logan Utah
Logan Utah East Stake	2 Feb 1947	Utah Ogden	Logan Utah
Logan Utah Married Student 1st Stake	21 Mar 1999	Utah Ogden	Logan Utah
Logan Utah Married Student 2nd Stake	22 Aug 2004	Utah Ogden	Logan Utah
Logan Utah Mount Logan Stake	17 Nov 1946	Utah Ogden	Logan Utah
Logan Utah South Stake	6 Jun 1982	Utah Ogden	Logan Utah
Logan Utah Stake	4 Jun 1920	Utah Ogden	Logan Utah
Logan Utah YSA 1st Stake	13 Apr 1958	Utah Ogden	Logan Utah
Logan Utah YSA 2nd Stake	12 Feb 1967	Utah Ogden	Logan Utah
Logan Utah YSA 3rd Stake	14 Nov 1976	Utah Ogden	Logan Utah
Logan Utah YSA 4th Stake	7 May 1989	Utah Ogden	Logan Utah
Logan Utah YSA 5th Stake	25 Jun 1995	Utah Ogden	Logan Utah
Logan Utah YSA 6th Stake	2 Aug 1998	Utah Ogden	Logan Utah
Logan Utah YSA 7th Stake	16 Sep 2018	Utah Ogden	Logan Utah
Logan Utah YSA 8th Stake	15 Sep 2024	Utah Ogden	Logan Utah
Magna Utah East Stake	17 Oct 1965	Utah Salt Lake City West	Taylorsville Utah
Magna Utah South Stake	20 Jan 1985	Utah Salt Lake City West	Taylorsville Utah
Magna Utah Stake	3 Jun 1923	Utah Salt Lake City West	Taylorsville Utah
Manti Utah Stake	9 Dec 1900	Utah Spanish Fork	Manti Utah
Mapleton Utah East Stake	25 Feb 2024	Utah Spanish Fork	Payson Utah
Mapleton Utah Maple Canyon Stake	2 Jun 2024	Utah Spanish Fork	Payson Utah
Mapleton Utah North Stake	8 Jun 1997	Utah Spanish Fork	Payson Utah
Mapleton Utah Stake	19 Oct 1975	Utah Spanish Fork	Payson Utah
Mapleton Utah West Stake	12 Jun 2016	Utah Spanish Fork	Payson Utah
Mendon Utah Stake	23 Nov 1997	Utah Ogden	Logan Utah
Mesquite Nevada East Stake	13 Feb 1994	Utah St George	St. George Utah
Midvale Utah Stake	30 Jun 1957	Utah Salt Lake City East	Jordan River Utah
Midvale Utah Union Fort Stake	8 May 1927	Utah Salt Lake City East	Jordan River Utah
Midvale Utah Union Park Stake	24 Jan 1999	Utah Salt Lake City East	Jordan River Utah
Midway Utah Stake	27 Mar 1983	Utah Provo	Provo Utah Rock Canyon
Midway Utah West Stake	15 Oct 2017	Utah Provo	Provo Utah Rock Canyon
Minersville Utah Stake	30 Jan 2000	Utah Spanish Fork	Cedar City Utah
Moab Utah Stake	19 Sep 1971	Utah Spanish Fork	Monticello Utah
Monroe Utah Stake	30 Jan 1921	Utah Spanish Fork	Manti Utah
Monticello Utah Stake	23 Sep 1883	New Mexico Farmington	Monticello Utah
Morgan Utah Stake	1 Jul 1877	Utah Layton	Ogden Utah
Morgan Utah West Stake	8 Mar 1981	Utah Layton	Ogden Utah
Moroni Utah Stake	16 Jun 1929	Utah Spanish Fork	Manti Utah
Mount Pleasant Utah North Stake	16 Mar 1997	Utah Spanish Fork	Manti Utah
Mount Pleasant Utah Stake	9 Dec 1900	Utah Spanish Fork	Manti Utah
Mountain Green Utah Stake	17 Sep 2017	Utah Layton	Ogden Utah
Murray Utah North Stake	11 Mar 1979	Utah Salt Lake City East	Taylorsville Utah
Murray Utah South Stake	28 Apr 1957	Utah Salt Lake City East	Taylorsville Utah
Murray Utah Stake	11 Feb 1951	Utah Salt Lake City East	Taylorsville Utah
Murray Utah West Stake	24 Nov 1968	Utah Salt Lake City East	Taylorsville Utah
Murray Utah YSA Stake	1 May 2011	Utah Salt Lake City East	Jordan River Utah
Nephi Utah North Stake	9 Jun 1985	Utah Saratoga Springs	Payson Utah
Nephi Utah Stake	20 Sep 1868	Utah Saratoga Springs	Payson Utah
Nibley Utah Stake	20 Jun 2004	Utah Ogden	Logan Utah
Nibley Utah West Stake	2 Jun 2019	Utah Ogden	Logan Utah
North Logan Utah Green Canyon Stake	22 Sep 1996	Utah Ogden	Logan Utah
North Logan Utah Stake	11 Oct 1970	Utah Ogden	Logan Utah
North Ogden Utah Ben Lomond Stake	27 Aug 1978	Utah Ogden	Ogden Utah
North Ogden Utah Coldwater Stake	23 Jun 1991	Utah Ogden	Ogden Utah
North Ogden Utah East Stake	13 Aug 2000	Utah Ogden	Ogden Utah
North Ogden Utah Stake	21 Nov 1943	Utah Ogden	Ogden Utah
North Salt Lake Utah Legacy Stake	15 Nov 2009	Utah Salt Lake City	Bountiful Utah
North Salt Lake Utah Parkway Stake	21 Mar 1982	Utah Salt Lake City	Bountiful Utah
North Salt Lake Utah Stake	15 Apr 1979	Utah Salt Lake City	Bountiful Utah
Oakley Idaho Stake	19 Nov 1887	Idaho Pocatello	Burley Idaho
Ogden Utah Burch Creek Stake	4 Feb 1979	Utah Ogden	Ogden Utah
Ogden Utah East Ridge Stake	20 Nov 1960	Utah Ogden	Ogden Utah
Ogden Utah East Stake	23 Nov 1952	Utah Ogden	Ogden Utah
Ogden Utah Mound Fort Stake	18 Jan 1942	Utah Ogden	Ogden Utah
Ogden Utah Mount Lewis Stake	29 Jun 1980	Utah Ogden	Ogden Utah
Ogden Utah Pleasant Valley Stake	10 Oct 2004	Utah Ogden	Ogden Utah
Ogden Utah Stake	19 Jul 1908	Utah Ogden	Ogden Utah
Ogden Utah Weber Heights Stake	30 Nov 1958	Utah Ogden	Ogden Utah
Ogden Utah Weber North Stake	19 Jul 1908	Utah Ogden	Ogden Utah
Ogden Utah Weber Stake	16 Aug 1970	Utah Ogden	Ogden Utah
Ogden Utah West Stake	12 Oct 1980	Utah Ogden	Ogden Utah
Ogden Utah YSA 1st Stake	12 May 1968	Utah Ogden	Ogden Utah
Ogden Utah YSA 2nd Stake	9 Nov 2003	Utah Ogden	Ogden Utah
Orem Utah 2nd Stake (Tongan)	19 May 2019	Utah Orem	Orem Utah
Orem Utah Aspen Stake	10 Jan 1988	Utah Orem	Lindon Utah
Orem Utah Canyon View Stake	3 Mar 1985	Utah Orem	Lindon Utah
Orem Utah Cascade Stake	8 Sep 1996	Utah Orem	Provo Utah Rock Canyon
Orem Utah Cherry Hill Stake	30 Nov 1958	Utah Orem	Orem Utah
Orem Utah City Center Stake	13 Feb 1977	Utah Orem	Orem Utah
Orem Utah Geneva Heights Stake	3 Nov 1957	Utah Orem	Orem Utah
Orem Utah Heatheridge Stake	17 Nov 1996	Utah Orem	Lindon Utah
Orem Utah Hillcrest Stake	1 Dec 1985	Utah Orem	Provo Utah Rock Canyon
Orem Utah Lakeridge Stake	16 Oct 1977	Utah Orem	Orem Utah
Orem Utah Lakeview Stake	28 Sep 1980	Utah Orem	Orem Utah
Orem Utah Mountain View Stake (Spanish)	13 Apr 2025	Utah Orem	Provo Utah Rock Canyon
Orem Utah North Stake	1 Nov 1970	Utah Orem	Lindon Utah
Orem Utah Northridge Stake	31 Jan 1988	Utah Orem	Lindon Utah
Orem Utah Orchard Stake	21 Mar 1976	Utah Orem	Provo Utah Rock Canyon
Orem Utah Park Stake	7 Sep 1980	Utah Orem	Orem Utah
Orem Utah Sharon Stake	15 Sep 1929	Utah Orem	Provo Utah Rock Canyon
Orem Utah Stake	13 Apr 1947	Utah Orem	Provo Utah Rock Canyon
Orem Utah Stonewood Stake	23 Jun 1996	Utah Orem	Orem Utah
Orem Utah Suncrest Stake	18 Sep 1977	Utah Orem	Orem Utah
Orem Utah Sunset Heights Stake	19 Sep 1971	Utah Orem	Orem Utah
Orem Utah Timpview Stake	12 Aug 1979	Utah Orem	Lindon Utah
Orem Utah Windsor Stake	9 Apr 1978	Utah Orem	Lindon Utah
Orem Utah YSA 1st Stake	26 Aug 1984	Utah Orem	Orem Utah
Orem Utah YSA 2nd Stake	1 Apr 2001	Utah Orem	Orem Utah
Orem Utah YSA 3rd Stake	27 Jun 2004	Utah Orem	Orem Utah
Orem Utah YSA 4th Stake	14 Mar 2021	Utah Orem	Orem Utah
Orem Utah YSA 5th Stake	21 Sep 2025	Utah Orem	Orem Utah
Page Arizona Stake	10 Mar 1974	New Mexico Farmington	Red Cliffs Utah
Panguitch Utah Stake	23 Apr 1877	Utah Spanish Fork	Cedar City Utah
Paradise Utah Stake	30 Apr 1901	Utah Ogden	Logan Utah
Paris Idaho Stake	20 Jun 1869	Idaho Pocatello	Logan Utah
Park City Utah Stake	10 Mar 1985	Utah Salt Lake City	Salt Lake
Parowan Utah Stake	12 May 1852	Utah St George	Cedar City Utah
Payson Utah Arrowhead Stake	19 Oct 2025	Utah Saratoga Springs	Payson Utah
Payson Utah Canyon Stake	18 Oct 1981	Utah Saratoga Springs	Payson Utah
Payson Utah Mount Nebo Stake	18 May 2008	Utah Saratoga Springs	Payson Utah
Payson Utah Mountain View Stake	24 Mar 1974	Utah Saratoga Springs	Payson Utah
Payson Utah Stake	13 Jan 1901	Utah Saratoga Springs	Payson Utah
Payson Utah West Stake	22 Nov 1981	Utah Saratoga Springs	Payson Utah
Perry Utah Stake	13 Apr 2008	Utah Ogden	Brigham City Utah
Plain City Utah Stake	30 Oct 1977	Utah Ogden	Ogden Utah
Pleasant Grove Utah East Stake	26 Feb 1978	Utah Orem	Lindon Utah
Pleasant Grove Utah Garden Stake	9 Apr 2000	Utah Orem	Lindon Utah
Pleasant Grove Utah Grove Creek Stake	24 Oct 1993	Utah Orem	Lindon Utah
Pleasant Grove Utah Manila Creek Stake	6 Jan 2019	Utah Orem	Mount Timpanogos Utah
Pleasant Grove Utah Manila Stake	23 Mar 1980	Utah Orem	Mount Timpanogos Utah
Pleasant Grove Utah Mount Mahogany Stake	10 Feb 2007	Utah Orem	Mount Timpanogos Utah
Pleasant Grove Utah North Field Stake	11 Jan 1998	Utah Orem	Mount Timpanogos Utah
Pleasant Grove Utah Stake	11 Oct 1970	Utah Orem	Lindon Utah
Pleasant Grove Utah Timpanogos Stake	1 Jul 1928	Utah Orem	Lindon Utah
Pleasant Grove Utah West Stake	17 May 2009	Utah Orem	Lindon Utah
Pleasant View Utah Orchard Springs Stake	9 Feb 2020	Utah Ogden	Ogden Utah
Pleasant View Utah South Stake	19 Oct 2008	Utah Ogden	Ogden Utah
Pleasant View Utah Stake	21 Nov 1971	Utah Ogden	Ogden Utah
Price Utah East Stake	8 May 1910	Utah Spanish Fork	Manti Utah
Price Utah West Stake	24 Jun 1945	Utah Spanish Fork	Manti Utah
Providence Utah South Stake	13 Jun 1982	Utah Ogden	Logan Utah
Providence Utah Stake	12 Dec 1971	Utah Ogden	Logan Utah
Provo Utah 1st Stake (Tongan)	6 Oct 2006	Utah Provo	Provo Utah Rock Canyon
Provo Utah Bonneville Stake	28 Aug 1983	Utah Provo	Provo City Center
Provo Utah Central Stake	19 Mar 1851	Utah Provo	Provo City Center
Provo Utah East Bay Stake (Spanish)	11 Aug 2024	Utah Provo	Provo City Center
Provo Utah East Stake	13 Apr 1947	Utah Provo	Provo City Center
Provo Utah Edgemont East Stake	16 Mar 2025	Utah Provo	Provo Utah Rock Canyon
Provo Utah Edgemont North Stake	20 Mar 1988	Utah Provo	Provo Utah Rock Canyon
Provo Utah Edgemont South Stake	19 Mar 1978	Utah Provo	Provo Utah Rock Canyon
Provo Utah Edgemont Stake	17 Jan 1971	Utah Provo	Provo Utah Rock Canyon
Provo Utah Freedom Stake	5 Jun 2016	Utah Provo	Provo City Center
Provo Utah Grandview East Stake	17 Nov 1996	Utah Provo	Provo Utah Rock Canyon
Provo Utah Grandview South Stake	30 May 1971	Utah Provo	Orem Utah
Provo Utah Grandview Stake	23 Nov 1980	Utah Provo	Orem Utah
Provo Utah Married Student 1st Stake	3 May 1964	Utah Provo	Provo Utah Rock Canyon
Provo Utah Married Student 2nd Stake	21 May 1989	Utah Provo	Provo Utah Rock Canyon
Provo Utah Married Student 3rd Stake	28 Jun 1992	Utah Provo	Provo City Center
Provo Utah Married Student 4th Stake	29 Sep 2024	Utah Provo	Provo Utah Rock Canyon
Provo Utah North Park Stake	21 Apr 1996	Utah Provo	Provo City Center
Provo Utah Oak Hills Stake	10 Apr 1977	Utah Provo	Provo Utah Rock Canyon
Provo Utah Parkway Stake	15 May 2005	Utah Provo	Orem Utah
Provo Utah Sharon East Stake	23 Nov 1952	Utah Provo	Provo Utah Rock Canyon
Provo Utah South Stake	2 Dec 1979	Utah Provo	Provo City Center
Provo Utah Stake	19 Feb 1939	Utah Provo	Provo City Center
Provo Utah Sunset Stake	29 May 1983	Utah Provo	Provo City Center
Provo Utah West Stake	4 May 1947	Utah Provo	Provo City Center
Provo Utah YSA 1st Stake	29 Oct 1978	Utah Provo	Provo City Center
Provo Utah YSA 2nd Stake	15 Aug 1999	Utah Provo	Provo Utah Rock Canyon
Provo Utah YSA 3rd Stake	6 Feb 2000	Utah Provo	Provo City Center
Provo Utah YSA 4th Stake	27 Jun 2004	Utah Provo	Provo Utah Rock Canyon
Provo Utah YSA 5th Stake	13 Apr 1975	Utah Provo	Provo City Center
Provo Utah YSA 6th Stake	12 Aug 2012	Utah Provo	Provo Utah Rock Canyon
Provo Utah YSA 7th Stake	28 Aug 2016	Utah Provo	Provo City Center
Provo Utah YSA 8th Stake	28 Aug 2016	Utah Provo	Provo Utah Rock Canyon
Provo Utah YSA 9th Stake	13 Oct 2024	Utah Provo	Provo Utah Rock Canyon
Provo Utah YSA 10th Stake	8 Jan 1956	Utah Provo	Provo Utah Rock Canyon
Provo Utah YSA 11th Stake	17 Apr 1960	Utah Provo	Provo Utah Rock Canyon
Provo Utah YSA 12th Stake	17 Apr 1960	Utah Provo	Provo City Center
Provo Utah YSA 13th Stake	3 May 1964	Utah Provo	Provo City Center
Provo Utah YSA 14th Stake	3 May 1964	Utah Provo	Provo City Center
Provo Utah YSA 15th Stake	30 Apr 1967	Utah Provo	Provo City Center
Provo Utah YSA 16th Stake	27 Apr 1969	Utah Provo	Provo City Center
Provo Utah YSA 17th Stake	27 Apr 1969	Utah Provo	Provo City Center
Provo Utah YSA 18th Stake	13 Apr 1975	Utah Provo	Provo Utah Rock Canyon
Provo Utah YSA 19th Stake	29 Oct 1978	Utah Provo	Provo City Center
Provo Utah YSA 20th Stake	31 Aug 1986	Utah Provo	Provo Utah Rock Canyon
Provo Utah YSA 21st Stake	21 Feb 1988	Utah Provo	Provo Utah Rock Canyon
Provo Utah YSA 22nd Stake	9 Aug 1998	Utah Provo	Provo City Center
Richfield Utah East Stake	24 May 1874	Utah Spanish Fork	Manti Utah
Richfield Utah Stake	12 Jun 1977	Utah Spanish Fork	Manti Utah
Richmond Utah Stake	1 May 1901	Utah Ogden	Logan Utah
River Heights Utah Stake	15 Nov 2009	Utah Ogden	Logan Utah
Riverdale Utah Stake	30 Nov 1952	Utah Ogden	Ogden Utah
Riverton Utah Central Stake	17 Sep 2000	Utah Salt Lake City South	Jordan River Utah
Riverton Utah Copperview Stake	25 Jun 2000	Utah Salt Lake City South	Jordan River Utah
Riverton Utah Harvest Park Stake	23 Jan 2011	Utah Salt Lake City South	Oquirrh Mountain Utah
Riverton Utah North Stake	23 Sep 1979	Utah Salt Lake City South	Jordan River Utah
Riverton Utah South Stake	3 Nov 1996	Utah Salt Lake City South	Jordan River Utah
Riverton Utah Stake	18 Sep 1960	Utah Salt Lake City South	Jordan River Utah
Riverton Utah Summerhill Stake	19 Jan 1992	Utah Salt Lake City South	Jordan River Utah
Riverton Utah Western Springs Stake	29 Jun 2014	Utah Salt Lake City South	Oquirrh Mountain Utah
Riverton Utah YSA Stake	1 May 2011	Utah Salt Lake City South	Jordan River Utah
Roosevelt Utah East Stake	11 Dec 1983	Utah Provo	Vernal Utah
Roosevelt Utah Stake	26 Jun 1920	Utah Provo	Vernal Utah
Roosevelt Utah West Stake	2 Mar 1975	Utah Provo	Vernal Utah
Roy Utah Midland Stake	13 Aug 2000	Utah Layton	Ogden Utah
Roy Utah North Stake	11 Jun 1967	Utah Layton	Ogden Utah
Roy Utah South Stake	24 Jan 1988	Utah Layton	Ogden Utah
Roy Utah Stake	26 Mar 1961	Utah Layton	Ogden Utah
Roy Utah West Stake	11 Jun 1978	Utah Layton	Ogden Utah
Salem Utah Stake	9 Mar 1975	Utah Saratoga Springs	Payson Utah
Salem Utah Summer Spring Stake	7 Jun 2026	Utah Saratoga Springs	Payson Utah
Salem Utah West Stake	23 Jun 1996	Utah Saratoga Springs	Payson Utah
Salem Utah Woodland Hills Stake	31 Jan 2021	Utah Saratoga Springs	Payson Utah
Salina Utah Stake	30 Jan 1921	Utah Spanish Fork	Manti Utah
Salt Lake Big Cottonwood Stake	28 May 1972	Utah Salt Lake City East	Salt Lake
Salt Lake Bonneville Stake	27 Oct 1935	Utah Salt Lake City	Salt Lake
Salt Lake Bonneville YSA Stake	12 Feb 1950	Utah Salt Lake City	Salt Lake
Salt Lake Butler West Stake	8 May 1966	Utah Salt Lake City East	Salt Lake
Salt Lake Cannon Stake	1 Mar 1953	Utah Salt Lake City	Salt Lake
Salt Lake Canyon Rim Stake	28 Oct 1956	Utah Salt Lake City East	Salt Lake
Salt Lake Central Stake	7 Feb 1960	Utah Salt Lake City	Salt Lake
Salt Lake Cottonwood Creek Stake	28 May 1978	Utah Salt Lake City East	Salt Lake
Salt Lake Cottonwood Stake	20 Oct 1940	Utah Salt Lake City East	Salt Lake
Salt Lake East Mill Creek North Stake	28 Jan 1979	Utah Salt Lake City East	Salt Lake
Salt Lake East Mill Creek Stake	17 Jun 1945	Utah Salt Lake City East	Salt Lake
Salt Lake Emigration Stake	10 Mar 1940	Utah Salt Lake City	Salt Lake
Salt Lake Ensign Stake	1 Apr 1904	Utah Salt Lake City	Salt Lake
Salt Lake Granger North Stake	26 Feb 1961	Utah Salt Lake City West	Taylorsville Utah
Salt Lake Granger South Stake	22 Aug 1976	Utah Salt Lake City West	Taylorsville Utah
Salt Lake Granite Stake	28 Jan 1900	Utah Salt Lake City	Salt Lake
Salt Lake Grant Stake	25 May 1924	Utah Salt Lake City	Salt Lake
Salt Lake Highland Stake	8 Sep 1935	Utah Salt Lake City	Salt Lake
Salt Lake Holladay North Stake	12 Feb 1978	Utah Salt Lake City East	Salt Lake
Salt Lake Holladay South Stake	16 Jun 1968	Utah Salt Lake City East	Salt Lake
Salt Lake Holladay Stake	18 Mar 1956	Utah Salt Lake City East	Salt Lake
Salt Lake Holladay YSA Stake	1 May 2011	Utah Salt Lake City East	Salt Lake
Salt Lake Hunter Central Stake	19 Nov 1978	Utah Salt Lake City West	Taylorsville Utah
Salt Lake Hunter Copperhill Stake	12 May 1985	Utah Salt Lake City West	Taylorsville Utah
Salt Lake Hunter Stake	5 Jan 1964	Utah Salt Lake City West	Taylorsville Utah
Salt Lake Hunter West Stake	13 Aug 1972	Utah Salt Lake City West	Taylorsville Utah
Salt Lake Jordan North Stake	12 Jan 1947	Utah Salt Lake City West	Taylorsville Utah
Salt Lake Liberty Stake	26 Feb 1904	Utah Salt Lake City	Salt Lake
Salt Lake Married Student Stake	30 Apr 1967	Utah Salt Lake City	Salt Lake
Salt Lake Millcreek Stake	29 Nov 1914	Utah Salt Lake City East	Salt Lake
Salt Lake Monument Park Stake	24 Jun 1951	Utah Salt Lake City	Salt Lake
Salt Lake Mount Olympus Stake	12 Apr 1964	Utah Salt Lake City East	Salt Lake
Salt Lake Olympus Stake	29 Jun 1958	Utah Salt Lake City East	Salt Lake
Salt Lake Parleys Stake	7 Dec 1958	Utah Salt Lake City	Salt Lake
Salt Lake Pioneer Stake	24 Mar 1904	Utah Salt Lake City	Salt Lake
Salt Lake Pioneer YSA Stake	5 May 2011	Utah Salt Lake City	Salt Lake
Salt Lake Rose Park North Stake	28 Nov 1965	Utah Salt Lake City	Salt Lake
Salt Lake Rose Park Stake	9 Oct 1955	Utah Salt Lake City	Salt Lake
Salt Lake Stake	3 Oct 1847	Utah Salt Lake City	Salt Lake
Salt Lake Utah Central Stake (Tongan)	19 May 2024	Utah Salt Lake City West	Taylorsville Utah
Salt Lake Utah South Stake (Tongan)	9 Sep 2001	Utah Salt Lake City South	Jordan River Utah
Salt Lake Utah Stake (Tongan)	28 Mar 1993	Utah Salt Lake City	Jordan River Utah
Salt Lake Utah West Stake (Tongan)	10 Feb 2019	Utah Salt Lake City West	Taylorsville Utah
Salt Lake Valley View Stake	28 Oct 1956	Utah Salt Lake City East	Salt Lake
Salt Lake Wasatch Stake	24 Feb 1980	Utah Salt Lake City	Salt Lake
Salt Lake Wilford Stake	11 Feb 1951	Utah Salt Lake City East	Salt Lake
Salt Lake Winder Stake	25 Jan 1959	Utah Salt Lake City East	Salt Lake
Sandy Utah Alta Vista Stake	29 Apr 1973	Utah Salt Lake City East	Draper Utah
Sandy Utah Central Stake	27 Aug 1978	Utah Salt Lake City East	Jordan River Utah
Sandy Utah Cottonwood Creek Stake	15 Oct 1978	Utah Salt Lake City East	Draper Utah
Sandy Utah Crescent Ridge Stake	24 Oct 1976	Utah Salt Lake City East	Draper Utah
Sandy Utah Crescent South Stake	19 Nov 1978	Utah Salt Lake City East	Jordan River Utah
Sandy Utah Crescent Stake	21 Oct 1973	Utah Salt Lake City East	Draper Utah
Sandy Utah Dimple Dell Stake	24 Feb 1980	Utah Salt Lake City East	Jordan River Utah
Sandy Utah East Stake	13 Jan 1963	Utah Salt Lake City East	Draper Utah
Sandy Utah Granite South Stake	17 Oct 1982	Utah Salt Lake City East	Draper Utah
Sandy Utah Granite Stake	22 Oct 1978	Utah Salt Lake City East	Draper Utah
Sandy Utah Granite View Stake	26 Oct 1986	Utah Salt Lake City East	Draper Utah
Sandy Utah Hidden Valley Stake	25 Aug 1991	Utah Salt Lake City East	Draper Utah
Sandy Utah Hillcrest Stake	13 Feb 1977	Utah Salt Lake City East	Jordan River Utah
Sandy Utah Lone Peak Stake	13 Apr 1997	Utah Salt Lake City East	Draper Utah
Sandy Utah Midvalley Stake	14 Jun 1981	Utah Salt Lake City East	Jordan River Utah
Sandy Utah Mount Jordan Stake	12 Apr 1959	Utah Salt Lake City East	Jordan River Utah
Sandy Utah West Stake	11 Jun 1972	Utah Salt Lake City East	Jordan River Utah
Sandy Utah Willow Creek Stake	17 Jun 1973	Utah Salt Lake City East	Draper Utah
Santa Clara Utah Heights Stake	13 Nov 2011	Utah St George	St. George Utah
Santa Clara Utah Stake	29 Aug 1982	Utah St George	St. George Utah
Santaquin Utah East Stake	11 Nov 2018	Utah Saratoga Springs	Payson Utah
Santaquin Utah North Stake	17 Apr 2005	Utah Saratoga Springs	Payson Utah
Santaquin Utah South Stake	2 Nov 2025	Utah Saratoga Springs	Payson Utah
Santaquin Utah Stake	22 Apr 1917	Utah Saratoga Springs	Payson Utah
Saratoga Springs Utah Crossroads Stake	20 Nov 2011	Utah Saratoga Springs	Saratoga Springs Utah
Saratoga Springs Utah Israel Canyon Stake	23 Mar 2014	Utah Orem	Saratoga Springs Utah
Saratoga Springs Utah Lake Mountain Stake	10 Oct 2021	Utah Orem	Saratoga Springs Utah
Saratoga Springs Utah Mount Saratoga Stake	15 May 2016	Utah Orem	Saratoga Springs Utah
Saratoga Springs Utah Mountain View Stake	22 Mar 2026	Utah Orem	Saratoga Springs Utah
Saratoga Springs Utah North Stake	12 Sep 2004	Utah Orem	Saratoga Springs Utah
Saratoga Springs Utah Quailhill Stake	11 Jun 2023	Utah Saratoga Springs	Saratoga Springs Utah
Saratoga Springs Utah Riverside Stake	11 Jun 2023	Utah Saratoga Springs	Saratoga Springs Utah
Saratoga Springs Utah Saratoga Hills Stake	8 Oct 2017	Utah Saratoga Springs	Saratoga Springs Utah
Saratoga Springs Utah South Stake	22 Mar 2009	Utah Saratoga Springs	Saratoga Springs Utah
Saratoga Springs Utah Springside Stake	9 Feb 2020	Utah Saratoga Springs	Saratoga Springs Utah
Saratoga Springs Utah Stake	16 Sep 2001	Utah Saratoga Springs	Saratoga Springs Utah
Smithfield Utah North Stake	21 Nov 1982	Utah Ogden	Logan Utah
Smithfield Utah South Stake	2 May 2010	Utah Ogden	Logan Utah
Smithfield Utah Stake	9 Jan 1938	Utah Ogden	Logan Utah
Smithfield Utah West Stake	7 Nov 2021	Utah Ogden	Logan Utah
South Jordan Utah Country Crossing Stake	14 Sep 2003	Utah Salt Lake City South	Oquirrh Mountain Utah
South Jordan Utah Country Park Stake	13 Aug 1995	Utah Salt Lake City South	Jordan River Utah
South Jordan Utah Eastlake Stake	3 Mar 2013	Utah Salt Lake City South	Oquirrh Mountain Utah
South Jordan Utah Founders Park Stake	18 Oct 2008	Utah Salt Lake City South	Oquirrh Mountain Utah
South Jordan Utah Garden Park Stake	10 Sep 2017	Utah Salt Lake City South	Oquirrh Mountain Utah
South Jordan Utah Glenmoor Stake	12 Oct 1980	Utah Salt Lake City South	Oquirrh Mountain Utah
South Jordan Utah Highland Park Stake	20 Aug 2023	Utah Salt Lake City South	Oquirrh Mountain Utah
South Jordan Utah Highland Stake	13 Jun 1999	Utah Salt Lake City South	Oquirrh Mountain Utah
South Jordan Utah Midas Creek Stake	11 Oct 2015	Utah Salt Lake City South	Oquirrh Mountain Utah
South Jordan Utah North Shore Stake	10 Sep 2017	Utah Salt Lake City South	Oquirrh Mountain Utah
South Jordan Utah Parkway Stake	19 Sep 1993	Utah Salt Lake City South	Jordan River Utah
South Jordan Utah River Ridge Stake	19 Nov 1995	Utah Salt Lake City South	Jordan River Utah
South Jordan Utah River Stake	9 Sep 1984	Utah Salt Lake City South	Jordan River Utah
South Jordan Utah Rushton View Stake	4 Mar 2006	Utah Salt Lake City South	Oquirrh Mountain Utah
South Jordan Utah Stake	18 May 1969	Utah Salt Lake City South	Jordan River Utah
South Ogden Utah Stake	7 Dec 1941	Utah Ogden	Ogden Utah
South Weber Utah Pioneer Stake	10 Dec 2023	Utah Layton	Ogden Utah
South Weber Utah Stake	27 Nov 1988	Utah Layton	Ogden Utah
Spanish Fork Utah Canyon Ridge Stake	12 Sep 2004	Utah Spanish Fork	Payson Utah
Spanish Fork Utah Canyon View Stake	9 Sep 2001	Utah Spanish Fork	Payson Utah
Spanish Fork Utah East Stake	10 Mar 1996	Utah Spanish Fork	Payson Utah
Spanish Fork Utah Legacy Farms Stake	10 Nov 2024	Utah Spanish Fork	Payson Utah
Spanish Fork Utah Maple Mountain Stake	12 Sep 2010	Utah Spanish Fork	Payson Utah
Spanish Fork Utah Palmyra Stake	23 Nov 1924	Utah Spanish Fork	Payson Utah
Spanish Fork Utah River Stake	24 Jan 2010	Utah Spanish Fork	Payson Utah
Spanish Fork Utah South Stake	9 Mar 1980	Utah Spanish Fork	Payson Utah
Spanish Fork Utah Stake	30 Sep 1956	Utah Spanish Fork	Payson Utah
Spanish Fork Utah Sunny Ridge Stake	15 Sep 2024	Utah Spanish Fork	Payson Utah
Spanish Fork Utah West Stake	19 Mar 1978	Utah Spanish Fork	Payson Utah
Spanish Fork Utah YSA Stake	30 Apr 1967	Utah Spanish Fork	Payson Utah
Springville Utah Dry Creek Stake	12 Sep 2010	Utah Spanish Fork	Provo City Center
Springville Utah Hobble Creek Stake	17 Jun 1984	Utah Spanish Fork	Provo City Center
Springville Utah Hobble Creek West Stake	21 Jan 2001	Utah Spanish Fork	Provo City Center
Springville Utah Kolob Stake	23 Nov 1924	Utah Spanish Fork	Provo City Center
Springville Utah Spring Creek South Stake	23 Feb 1997	Utah Spanish Fork	Provo City Center
Springville Utah Spring Creek Stake	31 Aug 1975	Utah Spanish Fork	Provo City Center
Springville Utah Stake	21 Oct 1956	Utah Spanish Fork	Provo City Center
Springville Utah West Stake	29 Aug 2004	Utah Spanish Fork	Provo City Center
St George Utah Bloomington Hills Stake	4 Jan 1987	Utah St George	Red Cliffs Utah
St George Utah Boulder Ridge East Stake	20 Nov 2022	Utah St George	Red Cliffs Utah
St George Utah Boulder Ridge Stake	15 Dec 2013	Utah St George	Red Cliffs Utah
St George Utah Crimson Ridge Stake	6 Nov 2016	Utah St George	Red Cliffs Utah
St George Utah Crimson Ridge West Stake	15 Nov 2020	Utah St George	Red Cliffs Utah
St George Utah East Stake	5 Feb 1961	Utah St George	St. George Utah
St George Utah Green Valley Stake	25 Aug 1991	Utah St George	St. George Utah
St George Utah Hidden Valley Stake	1 May 2022	Utah St George	Red Cliffs Utah
St George Utah Little Valley Stake	28 Aug 2005	Utah St George	Red Cliffs Utah
St George Utah Morningside Stake	20 Nov 1994	Utah St George	St. George Utah
St George Utah North Stake	29 Jan 2017	Utah St George	St. George Utah
St George Utah Pine View Stake	18 Jan 1987	Utah St George	Red Cliffs Utah
St George Utah Red Cliffs Stake	28 Oct 2006	Utah St George	St. George Utah
St George Utah Snow Canyon Stake	25 Aug 1991	Utah St George	St. George Utah
St George Utah Southgate Stake	15 Nov 2015	Utah St George	St. George Utah
St George Utah Stake	7 Nov 1869	Utah St George	St. George Utah
St George Utah Sunset Stake	26 Sep 2002	Utah St George	St. George Utah
St George Utah Washington Fields Stake	25 Jun 2000	Utah St George	Red Cliffs Utah
St George Utah YSA 1st Stake	30 May 1976	Utah St George	St. George Utah
St George Utah YSA 2nd Stake	16 Aug 1998	Utah St George	Red Cliffs Utah
Stansbury Park Utah South Stake	17 Feb 2007	Utah Salt Lake City West	Deseret Peak Utah
Stansbury Park Utah Stake	21 Feb 1999	Utah Salt Lake City West	Deseret Peak Utah
Sunset Utah Stake	11 Dec 1966	Utah Layton	Syracuse Utah
Syracuse Utah Bluff Stake	31 Oct 2004	Utah Layton	Syracuse Utah
Syracuse Utah Fremont Park Stake	21 Aug 2022	Utah Layton	Syracuse Utah
Syracuse Utah Lake View YSA Stake	1 May 2011	Utah Layton	Syracuse Utah
Syracuse Utah Legacy Park Stake	10 Mar 2007	Utah Layton	Syracuse Utah
Syracuse Utah South Stake	26 Apr 1992	Utah Layton	Syracuse Utah
Syracuse Utah Stake	20 Jun 1915	Utah Layton	Syracuse Utah
Syracuse Utah Waterfront Stake	20 Sep 2026	Utah Layton	Syracuse Utah
Syracuse Utah West Stake	30 Apr 2000	Utah Layton	Syracuse Utah
Taylorsville Utah Heritage Park Stake	6 Feb 1977	Utah Salt Lake City West	Taylorsville Utah
Taylorsville Utah South Stake	5 Feb 1984	Utah Salt Lake City West	Taylorsville Utah
Taylorsville Utah Stake	10 Oct 1954	Utah Salt Lake City West	Taylorsville Utah
Taylorsville Utah YSA Stake	1 May 2011	Utah Salt Lake City West	Taylorsville Utah
Tooele Utah East Stake	15 Aug 1999	Utah Salt Lake City West	Deseret Peak Utah
Tooele Utah North Stake	29 Mar 1953	Utah Salt Lake City West	Deseret Peak Utah
Tooele Utah South Stake	21 May 1978	Utah Salt Lake City West	Deseret Peak Utah
Tooele Utah Stake	24 Jun 1877	Utah Salt Lake City West	Deseret Peak Utah
Tooele Utah Valley View Stake	12 Sep 2004	Utah Salt Lake City West	Deseret Peak Utah
Tooele Utah West Stake	16 Aug 2015	Utah Salt Lake City West	Deseret Peak Utah
Tremonton Utah South Stake	25 Feb 1979	Utah Ogden	Brigham City Utah
Tremonton Utah Stake	1 May 1949	Utah Ogden	Brigham City Utah
Tremonton Utah West Stake	15 Aug 2010	Utah Ogden	Brigham City Utah
Tuba City Arizona Stake	25 Jun 1995	New Mexico Farmington	Snowflake Arizona
Vernal Utah Ashley Stake	2 Dec 1956	Utah Provo	Vernal Utah
Vernal Utah Glines Stake	19 Jun 1983	Utah Provo	Vernal Utah
Vernal Utah Maeser Stake	30 Apr 1978	Utah Provo	Vernal Utah
Vernal Utah Stake	11 Jul 1886	Utah Provo	Vernal Utah
Vernal Utah Uintah Stake	10 Jun 1986	Utah Provo	Vernal Utah
Vineyard Utah Grove Park Stake	26 Aug 2018	Utah Orem	Orem Utah
Vineyard Utah Springs Park Stake	11 Dec 2022	Utah Orem	Orem Utah
Vineyard Utah Springwater Stake	22 May 2022	Utah Orem	Orem Utah
Vineyard Utah Stake	16 Jun 2013	Utah Orem	Orem Utah
Vineyard Utah YSA Stake	19 Oct 2025	Utah Orem	Orem Utah
Wasatch Range Utah District (Correctional Facility)	19 Aug 2025		
Washington Terrace Utah East Stake	24 Feb 1963	Utah Ogden	Ogden Utah
Washington Terrace Utah West Stake	12 Dec 1976	Utah Ogden	Ogden Utah
Washington Utah Buena Vista Stake	1 Jun 1997	Utah St George	St. George Utah
Washington Utah Coral Canyon Stake	2 Jun 2024	Utah St George	Red Cliffs Utah
Washington Utah East Stake	22 Jun 2008	Utah St George	Red Cliffs Utah
Washington Utah Long Valley Stake	7 Jun 2026	Utah St George	Red Cliffs Utah
Washington Utah Riverside Stake	17 Jun 1979	Utah St George	Red Cliffs Utah
Washington Utah Stake	7 Jan 1979	Utah St George	Red Cliffs Utah
Wellsville Utah Stake	17 Jun 1979	Utah Ogden	Logan Utah
Wendover Utah District	4 Jan 1998	Utah Salt Lake City West	Elko Nevada
West Bountiful Utah Stake	11 Jun 1972	Utah Salt Lake City	Bountiful Utah
West Haven Utah North Stake	21 May 2023	Utah Ogden	Ogden Utah
West Haven Utah Stake	17 Oct 2010	Utah Ogden	Ogden Utah
West Jordan Utah Bingham Creek Stake	27 Jan 1985	Utah Salt Lake City South	Jordan River Utah
West Jordan Utah Cobble Creek Stake	2 May 2004	Utah Salt Lake City West	Oquirrh Mountain Utah
West Jordan Utah Copper Hills Stake	7 Jun 1998	Utah Salt Lake City West	Oquirrh Mountain Utah
West Jordan Utah Heritage Stake	21 May 1978	Utah Salt Lake City South	Jordan River Utah
West Jordan Utah Jordan Oaks Stake	14 Jan 1996	Utah Salt Lake City West	Jordan River Utah
West Jordan Utah Maples Stake	2 Feb 2020	Utah Salt Lake City West	Oquirrh Mountain Utah
West Jordan Utah Mountain Shadows Stake	27 Jan 1980	Utah Salt Lake City South	Jordan River Utah
West Jordan Utah Mountain View Stake	20 May 1973	Utah Salt Lake City South	Jordan River Utah
West Jordan Utah Oquirrh Point Stake	21 Oct 2007	Utah Salt Lake City West	Jordan River Utah
West Jordan Utah Oquirrh Stake	22 Nov 1981	Utah Salt Lake City West	Jordan River Utah
West Jordan Utah Park Stake	22 Aug 2004	Utah Salt Lake City West	Jordan River Utah
West Jordan Utah Prairie Stake	7 Feb 1988	Utah Salt Lake City West	Jordan River Utah
West Jordan Utah River Oaks Stake	20 Sep 1998	Utah Salt Lake City South	Jordan River Utah
West Jordan Utah River Stake	18 Sep 1983	Utah Salt Lake City South	Jordan River Utah
West Jordan Utah Stake	8 May 1927	Utah Salt Lake City South	Jordan River Utah
West Jordan Utah Sunset Ridge Stake	14 Jan 2006	Utah Salt Lake City West	Oquirrh Mountain Utah
West Jordan Utah Sycamores Stake	5 Feb 2012	Utah Salt Lake City West	Oquirrh Mountain Utah
West Jordan Utah Wasatch Meadows	19 May 2024	Utah Salt Lake City South	Jordan River Utah
West Jordan Utah Welby Stake	20 Jan 1985	Utah Salt Lake City West	Oquirrh Mountain Utah
West Jordan Utah Westbrook Stake	3 Feb 1985	Utah Salt Lake City South	Jordan River Utah
West Jordan Utah Westland Stake	21 May 2000	Utah Salt Lake City South	Jordan River Utah
West Jordan Utah YSA Stake	1 May 2011	Utah Salt Lake City South	Jordan River Utah
West Point Utah Lakeside Stake	9 Sep 2001	Utah Layton	Syracuse Utah
West Point Utah Stake	27 Apr 1980	Utah Layton	Syracuse Utah
West Valley Utah Granger Stake	8 Jun 1958	Utah Salt Lake City West	Taylorsville Utah
West Valley Utah Lake Park Stake	22 May 1977	Utah Salt Lake City West	Taylorsville Utah
Willard Utah Stake	25 Nov 1984	Utah Ogden	Brigham City Utah
Woods Cross Utah North Stake	28 Oct 2001	Utah Salt Lake City	Bountiful Utah
Woods Cross Utah Stake	4 Jan 1970	Utah Salt Lake City	Bountiful Utah

== Missions ==
Due to nonmembers coming into the state, Utah officially became a mission field with its own headquarters in 1975 when the Utah Salt Lake City Mission was organized. Previously, full-time missionaries worked in parts of Utah under the leadership of missions headquartered in other states.

As of July 2024, Utah has 13 missions and a Missionary Training Center.

Mission	Organized
Utah Layton Mission	January 1, 1989
Utah Ogden Mission	July 1, 1975
Utah Orem Mission	July 1, 2015
Utah Provo Mission	January 1, 1989
Utah Salt Lake City Headquarters Mission	January 25, 2008
Utah Saint George Mission	July 1, 2010
Utah Salt Lake City Mission	July 1, 1980
Utah Salt Lake City South Mission	July 1, 1998
Utah Salt Lake City West Mission	July 1, 2012
Utah Saratoga Springs Mission	July 1, 2024
Utah Spanish Fork Mission	July 1, 2024

In addition to these missions, the New Mexico Farmington Mission covers Southeastern Utah.

=== Missionary Training Center ===
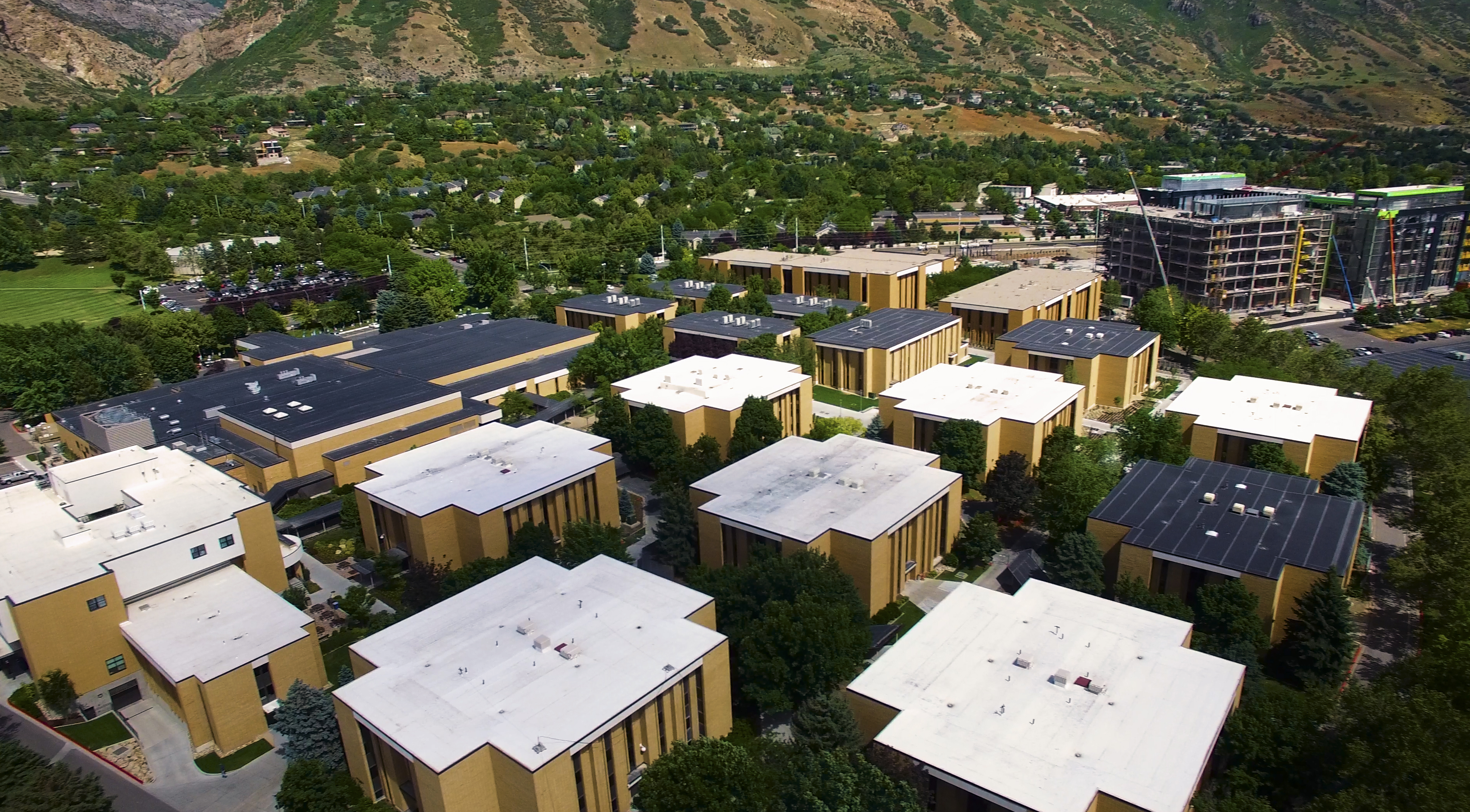
Missionary Training Center in Provo

The first training for missionaries began in 1832 with the School of the Prophets. Some further educational centers were:

- The Brigham Young Academy (1894)
- The Ricks Academy (early 1900s)
- The Latter-Day Saint University (1902)
- The Salt Lake Mission Home (1924)
- The Missionary Language Institute (1961)
- The Language Training Mission (1962)

And finally, the Provo Missionary Training Center (1978)

== Temples ==
Temples in Utah ()
Temples along the Wasatch Front ()

= Operating
= Under construction
= Announced
= Temporarily Closed

As of November 2026, Utah has 26 operating temples, with 2 under construction and 4 others announced.

=== Dedicated 1800s ===
Dedicated 1800's
1. St. George Utah Temple; Official website; News & images	
Location: Announced: Groundbreaking: Dedicated: Rededicated: Size: Style:	St. George, Utah, United States; January 31, 1871 by Brigham Young; November 9, 1871 by Brigham Young; April 6, 1877 by Daniel H. Wells; November 11, 1975 by Spencer W. Kimball; 143,969 sq ft (13,375.2 m^{2}) on a 6.5-acre (2.6 ha) site Castellated Neo-Gothic - designed by Truman O. Angell
2. Logan Utah Temple; Official website; News & images	
Location: Announced: Groundbreaking: Dedicated: Rededicated: Size: Style:	Logan, Utah, United States; October 6, 1876 by Brigham Young; May 17, 1877 by John Willard Young; May 17, 1884 by John Taylor; March 13, 1979 by Spencer W. Kimball; 119,619 sq ft (11,113.0 m^{2}) on a 9-acre (3.6 ha) site Castellated Gothic - designed by Truman O. Angell
3. Manti Utah Temple; Official website; News & images	
Location: Announced: Groundbreaking: Dedicated: Rededicated: Size: Style: Notes:	Manti, Utah, United States; June 25, 1875 by Brigham Young; April 25, 1877 by Brigham Young; May 21, 1888 by Lorenzo Snow; June 14, 1985 by Gordon B. Hinckley; 74,792 sq ft (6,948.4 m^{2}) on a 27-acre (11 ha) site Castellated Gothic - designed by William H. Folsom; Wilford Woodruff performed a private dedication on May 17, 1888. On May 1, 2021, Russell M. Nelson announced that the temple would close for renovation on October 1, 2021.
4. Salt Lake Temple (Closed for renovation); Official website; News & images	
Location: Announced: Groundbreaking: Dedicated: Rededicated: Size: Style: Notes:	Salt Lake City, Utah, United States; 28 July 1847 by Brigham Young; 14 February 1853 by Brigham Young; 6 April 1893 by Wilford Woodruff; TBA by TBA; 382,207 sq ft (35,508.2 m^{2}) on a 10-acre (4.0 ha) site Neo-Gothic, Neo-Romanesque, six-spire temple - designed by Truman O. Angell; The Salt Lake temple was dedicated in 31 sessions held between April 6 and 24, 1893.

=== Dedicated 1900s ===
Dedicated 1900s
14. Ogden Utah Temple; Official website; News & images	
Location: Announced: Groundbreaking: Dedicated: Rededicated: Size: Style: Notes:	Ogden, Utah, United States; August 24, 1967 by David O. McKay; September 8, 1969 by Hugh B. Brown; January 18, 1972 by Joseph Fielding Smith; September 21, 2014 by Thomas S. Monson; 112,232 sq ft (10,426.7 m^{2}) on a 9.96-acre (4.03 ha) site Modern, single-tower design - designed by Emil B. Fetzer; The temple was closed for 3 1/2 years to undergo renovations that significantly modified the look of the building. Following an open house from August 1 to September 6, 2014, the temple was rededicated on September 21, 2014.
15. Provo Utah Temple (Closed for renovation); Official website; News & images	
Location: Announced: Groundbreaking: Dedicated: Size: Style: Notes:	Provo, Utah, United States; August 14, 1967 by David O. McKay; September 15, 1969 by Hugh B. Brown; February 9, 1972 by Joseph Fielding Smith; 128,325 sq ft (11,921.8 m^{2}) on a 17-acre (6.9 ha) site Functional modern with single center spire design - designed by Emil B. Fetzer; Harold B. Lee read the dedicatory prayer prepared by Joseph Fielding Smith
20. Jordan River Utah Temple; Official website; News & images	
Location: Announced: Groundbreaking: Dedicated: Rededicated: Size:	South Jordan, Utah, United States; February 3, 1978 by Spencer W. Kimball; June 9, 1979 by Spencer W. Kimball; November 16, 1981 by Marion G. Romney; May 20, 2018 by Henry B. Eyring; 148,236 sq ft (13,771.6 m^{2}) on a 15-acre (6.1 ha) site - designed by Emil B. Fetzer
47. Bountiful Utah Temple; Official website; News & images	
Location: Announced: Groundbreaking: Dedicated: Size: Style:	Bountiful, Utah, United States; April 6, 1991 by Ezra Taft Benson; May 2, 1992 by Ezra Taft Benson; January 8, 1995 by Howard W. Hunter; 104,000 sq ft (9,700 m^{2}) on a 9-acre (3.6 ha) site Classic modern, single-spire design - designed by Allen B. Erekson
49. Mount Timpanogos Utah Temple; Official website; News & images	
Location: Announced: Groundbreaking: Dedicated: Size: Style:	American Fork, Utah, United States; October 3, 1992 by Ezra Taft Benson; October 9, 1993 by Gordon B. Hinckley; October 13, 1996 by Gordon B. Hinckley; 107,240 sq ft (9,963 m^{2}) on a 16.7-acre (6.8 ha) site Classic modern, single-spire design - designed by Allen Erekson, Keith Stepan, and Church A&E Services
51. Vernal Utah Temple; Official website; News & images	
Location: Announced: Groundbreaking: Dedicated: Size: Style:	Vernal, Utah, United States; February 13, 1994 by Ezra Taft Benson; May 13, 1995 by Gordon B. Hinckley; November 2, 1997 by Gordon B. Hinckley; 38,771 sq ft (3,601.9 m^{2}) on a 1.6-acre (0.65 ha) site Adaptation of Uintah Stake Tabernacle - designed by FFKR Architects
53. Monticello Utah Temple; Official website; News & images	
Location: Announced: Groundbreaking: Dedicated: Rededicated: Size: Style:	Monticello, Utah, United States; October 4, 1997 by Gordon B. Hinckley; November 17, 1997 by Ben B. Banks; July 26, 1998 by Gordon B. Hinckley; November 17, 2002 by Gordon B. Hinckley; 11,225 sq ft (1,042.8 m^{2}) on a 1.33-acre (0.54 ha) site Classic modern, single-spire design - designed by Church A&E Services

=== Dedicated 2000s and 2010s ===
Dedicated 2000s and 2010s
129. Draper Utah Temple; Official website; News & images	
Location: Announced: Groundbreaking: Dedicated: Size: Notes:	Draper, Utah, U.S. October 2, 2004 by Gordon B. Hinckley; August 5, 2006 by Gordon B. Hinckley; March 20, 2009 by Thomas S. Monson; 58,300 sq ft (5,420 m^{2}) on a 12-acre (4.9 ha) site - designed by FFKR Architects; The 12th temple dedicated in Utah, the Draper Utah Temple has been operating since March 2009.
130. Oquirrh Mountain Utah Temple; Official website; News & images	
Location: Announced: Groundbreaking: Dedicated: Size: Notes:	South Jordan, Utah, United States; October 1, 2005 by Gordon B. Hinckley; December 16, 2006 by Gordon B. Hinckley; August 21, 2009 by Thomas S. Monson; 60,000 sq ft (5,600 m^{2}) on a 11-acre (4.5 ha) site - designed by Naylor Wentworth; 13th temple in Utah and 130th temple of the Church.
139. Brigham City Utah Temple; Official website; News & images	
Location: Announced: Groundbreaking: Dedicated: Size:	Brigham City, Utah, United States; October 3, 2009 by Thomas S. Monson; July 31, 2010 by Boyd K. Packer; September 23, 2012 by Boyd K. Packer; 36,000 sq ft (3,300 m^{2}) on a 3.14-acre (1.27 ha) site
146. Payson Utah Temple; Official website; News & images	
Location: Announced: Groundbreaking: Dedicated: Size: Notes:	Payson, Utah, U.S. January 25, 2010 by Thomas S. Monson; October 8, 2011 by Dallin H. Oaks; June 7, 2015 by Henry B. Eyring; 96,630 sq ft (8,977 m^{2}) on a 10.63-acre (4.30 ha) site A public open house was held from April 24-May 23, 2015, excluding Sundays, and the temple was dedicated in three sessions on June 7, 2015.
150. Provo City Center Temple; Official website; News & images	
Location: Announced: Groundbreaking: Dedicated: Size: Notes:	Provo, Utah, U.S. October 1, 2011 by Thomas S. Monson; May 12, 2012 by Jeffrey R. Holland; March 20, 2016 by Dallin H. Oaks; 85,084 sq ft (7,904.6 m^{2}) on a 5.6-acre (2.3 ha) site
159. Cedar City Utah Temple; Official website; News & images	
Location: Announced: Groundbreaking: Dedicated: Size:	Cedar City, Utah, United States; April 6, 2013 by Thomas S. Monson; August 8, 2015 by L. Whitney Clayton; December 10, 2017 by Henry B. Eyring; 42,657 sq ft (3,963.0 m^{2}) on a 9.5-acre (3.8 ha) site - designed by Architectural Nexus, Salt Lake City, Utah

=== Dedicated 2020s ===
Dedicated 2020s
179. Saratoga Springs Utah Temple; Official website; News & images	
Location: Announced: Groundbreaking: Dedicated: Size:	Saratoga Springs, Utah, United States; 2 April 2017 by Thomas S. Monson; 19 October 2019 by Craig C. Christensen; 13 August 2023 by Henry B. Eyring; 97,836 sq ft (9,089.3 m^{2}) on a 22.71-acre (9.19 ha) site
188. Orem Utah Temple; Official website; News & images	
Location: Announced: Groundbreaking: Dedicated: Size:	Orem, Utah, United States; 5 October 2019 by Russell M. Nelson; 5 September 2020 by Craig C. Christensen; 21 January 2024 by D. Todd Christofferson; 71,998 sq ft (6,688.8 m^{2}) on a 15.39-acre (6.23 ha) site
189. Red Cliffs Utah Temple; Official website; News & images	
Location: Announced: Groundbreaking: Dedicated: Size:	St. George, Utah, United States; 7 October 2018 by Russell M. Nelson; 7 November 2020 by Jeffrey R. Holland; 24 March 2024 by Henry B. Eyring; 96,277 sq ft (8,944.4 m^{2}) on a 15.31-acre (6.20 ha) site
192. Taylorsville Utah Temple; Official website; News & images	
Location: Announced: Groundbreaking: Dedicated: Size:	Taylorsville, Utah, United States; 5 October 2019 by Russell M. Nelson; 31 October 2020 by Gerrit W. Gong; 2 June 2024 by Gerrit W. Gong; 73,492 sq ft (6,827.6 m^{2}) on a 7.5-acre (3.0 ha) site
195. Layton Utah Temple; Official website; News & images	
Location: Announced: Groundbreaking: Dedicated: Size:	Layton, Utah, United States; 1 April 2018 by Russell M. Nelson; 23 May 2020 by Craig C. Christensen; 16 June 2024 by David A. Bednar; 93,539 sq ft (8,690.1 m^{2}) on a 11.8-acre (4.8 ha) site
200. Deseret Peak Utah Temple; Official website; News & images	
Location: Announced: Groundbreaking: Dedicated: Size: Notes:	Tooele, Utah, United States; 7 April 2019 by Russell M. Nelson; 15 May 2021 by Brook P. Hales; 10 November 2024 by Russell M. Nelson; 71,998 sq ft (6,688.8 m^{2}) on a 15.5-acre (6.3 ha) site Announced by Russell M. Nelson on April 7, 2019, with name and location change announced January 19, 2021.
206. Syracuse Utah Temple; Official website; News & images	
Location: Announced: Groundbreaking: Dedicated: Size:	Syracuse, Utah, United States; 5 April 2020 by Russell M. Nelson; 12 June 2021 by Kevin R. Duncan; 8 June 2025 by Russell M. Nelson; 90,526 sq ft (8,410.1 m^{2}) on a 12.268-acre (4.965 ha) site
216. Lindon Utah Temple; Official website; News & images	
Location: Announced: Groundbreaking: Dedicated: Size:	Lindon, Utah, United States; 4 October 2020 by Russell M. Nelson; 23 April 2022 by Kevin W. Pearson; 3 May 2026 by Henry B. Eyring; 83,140 sq ft (7,724 m^{2}) on a 12.63-acre (5.11 ha) site
223. Ephraim Utah Temple; Official website; News & images	
Location: Announced: Groundbreaking: Dedicated: Size:	Ephraim, Utah, United States; 1 May 2021 by Russell M. Nelson; 27 August 2022 by Russell M. Nelson; 11 October 2026 by Ronald A. Rasband; 41,680 sq ft (3,872 m^{2}) on a 9.16-acre (3.71 ha) site

=== Under Construction ===
Under Construction
235. Smithfield Utah Temple (Dedication scheduled); Official website; News & images	
Location: Announced: Groundbreaking: Open House: Dedicated: Size: Notes:	Smithfield, Utah, United States; 4 April 2021 by Russell M. Nelson; 18 June 2022 by Quentin L. Cook (Gary E. Stevenson assisting); 25 February-27 March 2027 scheduled for 18 April 2027; 83,000 sq ft (7,700 m^{2}) on a 13.3-acre (5.4 ha) site Location announced on June 10, 2021 to be at the intersection of N 800 West and W 100 North in Smithfield.
240. Heber Valley Utah Temple (Under construction); Official website; News & images	
Location: Announced: Groundbreaking: Size:	Heber City, Utah, United States; 3 October 2021 by Russell M. Nelson; 8 October 2022 by Russell M. Nelson; 88,000 sq ft (8,200 m^{2}) on a 17.9-acre (7.2 ha) site

=== Announced ===
Announced
299. Lehi Utah Temple (Groundbreaking scheduled); Official website; News & images	
Location: Announced: Groundbreaking: Size:	Lehi, Utah, United States; 7 April 2024 by Russell M. Nelson scheduled for 5 December 2026 by John A. McCune; 85,000 sq ft (7,900 m^{2}) on a 22.48-acre (9.10 ha) site
351. West Jordan Utah Temple (Site announced); Official website; News & images	
Location: Announced: Size:	West Jordan, Utah, United States; 7 April 2024 by Russell M. Nelson; 85,000 sq ft (7,900 m^{2}) on a 16.1-acre (6.5 ha) site
367. Price Utah Temple (Announced); Official website; News & images	
Location: Announced:	Price, Utah, United States; 6 October 2024 by Russell M. Nelson
382. Spanish Fork Utah Temple (Site announced); Official website; News & images	
Location: Announced: Size:	Spanish Fork; 6 April 2025 by Russell M. Nelson; 80,000 sq ft (7,400 m^{2}) on a 8.7-acre (3.5 ha) site

== Communities ==
Latter-day Saints had a significant role in establishing and settling communities within the "Mormon Corridor", including the following in Utah:

- American Fork
- Beaver
- Brigham City
- Cedar City
- Cornish
- Delta
- Deseret
- Ephraim
- Fillmore
- Green River
- Gunnison
- Heber
- Hurricane
- Layton
- Lehi
- Logan
- Magna
- Manti
- Mapleton
- Moab
- Monroe
- Nephi
- Orem
- Ogden
- Parowan
- Payson
- Pleasant Grove
- Price
- Provo
- Richfield
- Roy
- Salem
- Salina
- Salt Lake City
- Sandy
- Santaquin
- Saratoga Springs
- Sevier
- Spanish Fork
- Spring Lake
- Springville
- St. George
- Tooele
- Vernal
- West Valley City

== See also ==
- State of Deseret
- Religion in Utah
