= Manhattan New York Temple =

Temple of the LDS church

- Closed for renovation
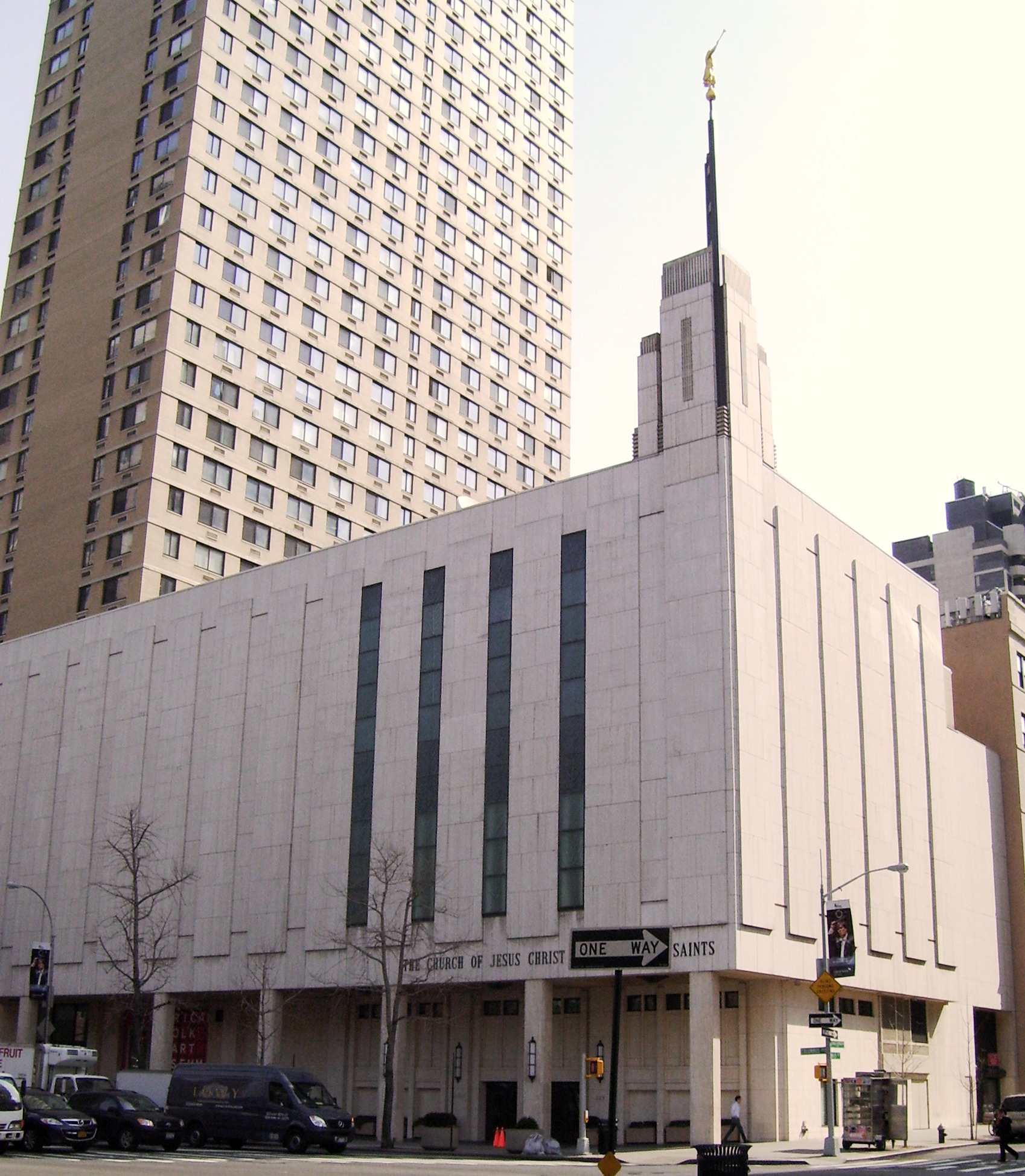
- (2011)
- Interactive map of Manhattan New York Temple
- Number: 119
- Dedication: June 13, 2004, by Gordon B. Hinckley
- Site: 0.3 acres (0.12 ha)
- Floor area: 20,630 ft^{2} (1,917 m^{2})
- Height: 120 ft (37 m)
- Official website • News & images

Church chronology
| ← Copenhagen Denmark Temple | Manhattan New York Temple | → San Antonio Texas Temple |

Additional information
- Announced: August 7, 2002, by Gordon B. Hinckley
- Groundbreaking: September 23, 2002, by Gordon B. Hinckley
- Open house: May 8 – June 5, 2004
- Current president: George Kem Nixon
- Designed by: Frank Fernandez
- Location: New York City, U.S.
- Coordinates: 40°46′23.52719″N 73°58′53.34600″W
- Exterior finish: Light, variegated granite
- Baptistries: 1
- Ordinance rooms: 2 (two-stage progressive)
- Sealing rooms: 2
- Clothing rental: Yes

The Manhattan New York Temple is the 119th operating temple of the Church of Jesus Christ of Latter-day Saints (LDS Church). It is the church's second "high rise" temple to be constructed, after the Hong Kong China Temple, and the third converted from an existing building, after the Vernal Utah and Copenhagen Denmark temples.

The intent to build the temple was announced by church president Gordon B. Hinckley on August 7, 2002. The temple is the first in New York City and is one of two in the state of New York–the other being the Palmyra New York Temple. The temple was designed by Frank Fernandez, using a modern architectural style. A groundbreaking ceremony, to signify the beginning of construction was held on September 23, 2002, conducted by Spencer J. Condie, a church general authority.

== History ==
The announcement of a temple to be built in New York City was made on August 7, 2002, and received widespread news coverage. Previously, on March 24, 2002, at a special regional conference broadcast from Manhattan to surrounding stakes and districts, Hinckley stated that he expected a temple to be built in the area in the next two years. It was widely assumed that this was in reference to the previously announced temple in Harrison, New York, construction of which had been delayed for several years. The need for a temple in the area became apparent during the previous decade when local church membership tripled to more than 42,000 members.

A groundbreaking ceremony and site dedication were held on September 23, 2002, with construction beginning soon after. The architect, Frank Fernandez, had worked on other large building projects for the church in Manhattan. Like the Vernal Utah Temple, the church adapted an existing stake center building—which stands on the northeast corner of the intersection of West 65th Street, Broadway, and Columbus Avenue, and is across the street from Lincoln Center—into the temple. Converting an existing building instead of constructing from the ground up, as is typical of the church's temples, was made after considering property values in the area. This was a similar issue to the Hong Kong Temple. The building to be converted into the temple was selected by Hinckley, who was enthused at the prospect of adapting the top floors into a temple. The original building was dedicated in May 1975 by church president Spencer W. Kimball and still houses a church public affairs office on the second floor and a chapel, cultural hall, baptismal font, and classrooms on the third floor.

The temple currently occupies part of the first floor and all of the building's fourth, fifth, and sixth floors. (Originally, prior to renovations announced in 2006, it occupied part of the first and second floors and all of the fifth and sixth floors, but none of the fourth floor, which floor had housed offices of the New York New York Stake since 1975.) The insides of these floors were completely renovated. Previously, the fifth and sixth floors constituted a second chapel and set of classrooms that were dedicated in 2002, which in turn were adapted from an early gym and sports club built as part of the neighboring apartment complex. The walls of the temple were designed to be soundproof so that the noise of the traffic outside would not interrupt its patrons. The total floor area for the temple part of the building is approximately 20,630 square feet (1,917 m^{2}) and the temple houses two progressive endowment ordinance rooms on the fifth floor and two sealing rooms on the sixth floor, along with a baptismal font on the main floor. Uncommon to some temples with two progressive ordinance rooms, the second ordinance room of the temple is perpendicular to the first (due to the building's size limitations). The building's elevator system is unique, in that it is designed to service generally public floors for Sunday worship services and temple-only areas when the temple is in operation on other days of the week.

The Manhattan New York Temple was dedicated in four sessions on June 13, 2004, by Hinckley.

== Design and architecture ==
The building has a modern architectural style, coupled with a traditional Latter-day Saint temple design. The architectural work reflects both the cultural heritage of New York City and the spiritual significance of the church.

=== Exterior ===
The structure stands six stories tall, constructed with light, variegated granite. The exterior is characterized by a steeple and a statue of the angel Moroni. The design uses elements that reflect both local culture and broader church symbolism; it was intended to stand as a symbol of the church while blending in with surrounding New York City landmarks such as the Lincoln Center.

=== Interior ===
The interior features a large glass mural and several paintings, centered around the celestial room, which is designed to foster a spiritually uplifting environment. The temple includes a baptistry, two ordinance rooms, and two sealing rooms, each designed for ceremonial use.

=== Symbols ===
The temple incorporates a variety of symbolic elements that reflect basic doctrinal beliefs of the LDS Church concerning Jesus Christ and his teachings, as well as symbols important within the local community. The temple's design motifs include "living waters," beehives, olives and olive trees, grapevines, starbursts, and the Statue of Liberty. Even the furniture upholstery tacks incorporate specific symbolic elements (e.g., crowns, stars, beehives, etc.). Carved into the medium-stain oak wood panels and molding are beehives, while door handle escutcheon plates incorporate the Statue of Liberty torch together with fig or grape leaves and stars. Curved archways above ordinance room doors and mirrors contain design elements specifically adapted from the Salt Lake Temple.

On the main (first or ground-level) floor of the temple, directly in front of two interior bronze front doors that incorporate abstract starbursts, is a large art glass mural depicting the resurrected Christ speaking with two of his disciples on the road to Emmaus. Also on the main floor is the baptistry, where vicarious baptisms are performed. Above the baptismal font is a large mural showing the waters of the Jordan River flowing down toward the font.

The fifth floor of the temple contains patron changing areas, a small chapel (which initially served as temple office space), and endowment ordinance rooms. The first endowment ordinance room (representing the traditional temple creation, garden, and world rooms (or Telestial Kingdom)) has wall-to-ceiling murals depicting the natural landscape and fauna common to the Hudson River Valley. The second endowment room (representing the Terrestrial Kingdom) extends approximately one and one-half floors high and contains two unadorned faux art glass windows and Ionic columns gilded with white gold leaf highlights. Above the veil is a long horizontal art glass window with olive fruit and branches. The Celestial Room is perfectly square. Flanking its walls are 8 Corinthian columns (four half-columns and 4 quarter-columns), the capitals of which are lightly gilded with yellow and white gold leaf, plus 4 mirrors and two faux art glass windows with olive fruit and olive leaves surrounded by grapes and grape leaves. The height of the Celestial Room extends two stories and incorporates an upper-level balcony (which is non-accessible to patrons) that maximizes a sense of open vertical space. Above the balcony arches and art glass windows, on each of the room's walls, are four round abstract starburst windows.

The sixth floor of the temple has a long hallway and an open stairwell that lead to two sealing rooms, each of which contains two faux art glass windows similar to (but not exactly the same as) those found in the Celestial Room. The walls of the Celestial Room and the two sealing rooms are finished in cream Venetian plaster.

All interior art glass windows were created by Utah-based artist Tom Holdman. All are backlit to preserve a quiet atmosphere devoid of city traffic distractions. Hallway walls have original works of art by landscape artists depicting scenes from nature as well as other artwork prints commonly found in other church temples and meetinghouses. Both the first endowment ordinance room and baptismal font murals were painted by Linda Curley Christensen.

The temple exterior retains much of the original travertine stone facade. Also on the temple exterior are large art glass panels depicting flowing water.

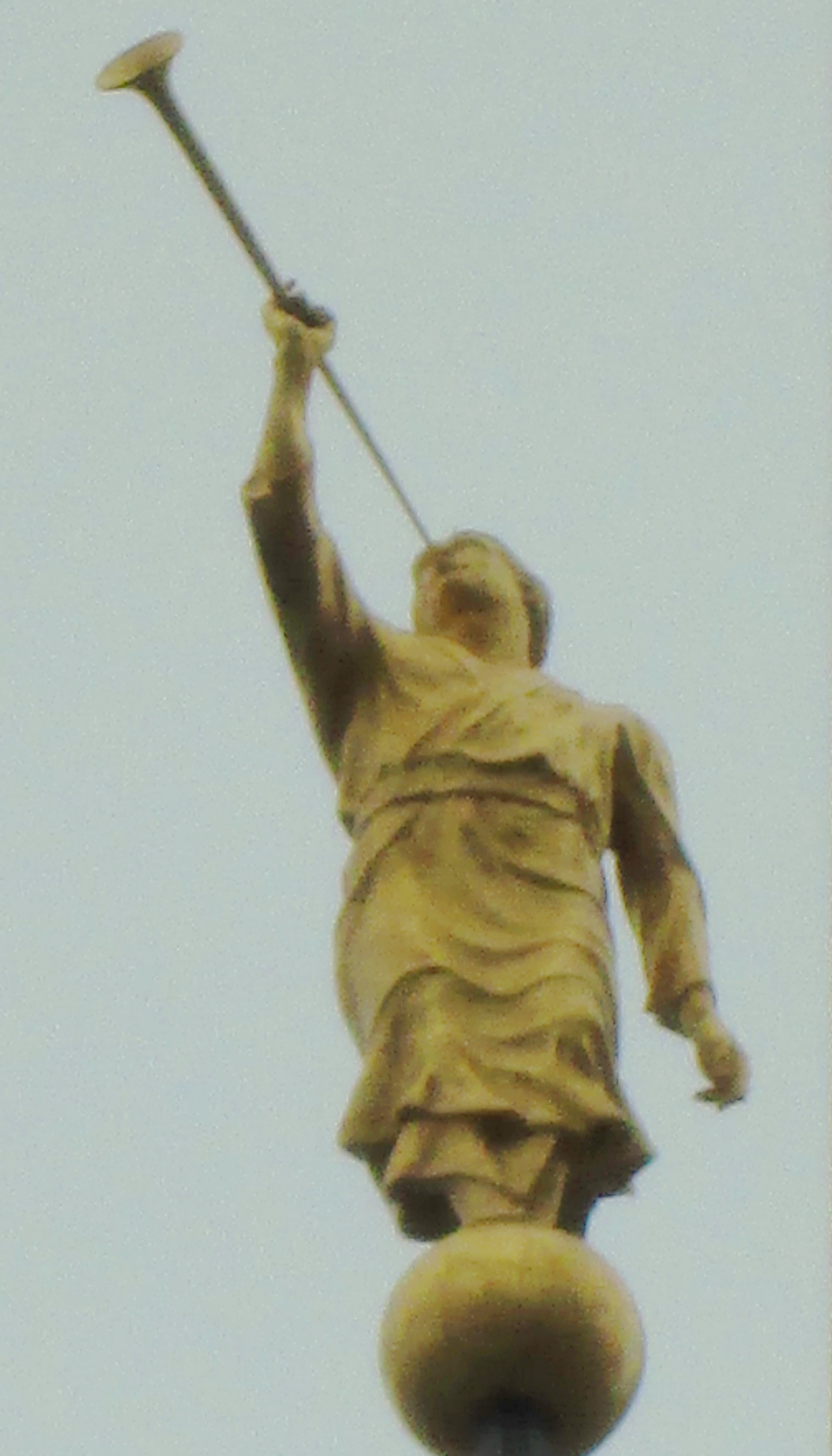
The statue of the Angel Moroni atop the building (December 2016)

=== Steeple completion and later modifications ===
Just before the temple dedication it was announced that a statue of the angel Moroni would be added to the almost-completed steeple in the fall of 2004. On October 9, 2004, several thousand people came to watch the ten-foot gold-leafed statue be placed on top of the steeple. Unlike the angel Moroni atop most church temples that face eastward, the angel Moroni on this temple points southwest, since the pre-existing building faced that direction.

On November 12, 2006, it was announced that the fourth floor, which at the time housed classrooms and stake offices associated with the third-floor chapel, would be converted to become part of the temple and that the stake center for the New York New York Stake would be moved to a new location on East 87th Street. This work was completed in August 2007. The temple baptistry continues to occupy part of the first floor of the building, and the rest of the temple occupies all of the fourth, fifth, and sixth floors. The third floor remains a chapel for local congregations, and the second floor continues to house a public affairs office as well as a small distribution center and multiple-use room.

During later renovations to the third floor meetinghouse space, the chapel windows, which had previously allowed in natural light but were sealed off during temple construction, were opened up again to allow in natural light through the art glass windows.

In 2010, the exterior of the temple was modified to add stone-clad support columns along the Columbus Avenue-side arcade. In early 2011, the sidewalk space between the support columns and the temple proper was upgraded to incorporate a series of stylized granite beehive medallions matching in appearance those found elsewhere within the temple.

== Open house and dedication ==
The local temple committee, under the direction of general authority Glenn L. Pace, and later David R. Stone, was headed by Brent J. Belnap, president of the church's New York New York Stake and assisted by W. Blair Garff (later called as temple president), Stephen D. Quinn, and others. From May 8 through June 5, 2004, more than 53,000 people toured the temple during the public open house. Church members and non-members alike viewed a 15-minute introductory video and took a 40-minute walking tour through the first, fifth, and sixth floors of the temple. Many others experienced the temple through worldwide media coverage. Local church members who were called to help, assisted by church missionaries, gave the tours. Special guests during the open house included two members of the United States Senate and other national and local dignitaries.

On June 12, 2004, a cultural "jubilee celebration" was held at Radio City Music Hall, entitled "A Standard for the Nations." It was a two-hour performance including more than 2,400 LDS youth from the area (the largest cast to ever perform on the stage of Radio City Music Hall). In attendance were LDS Church president Hinckley and Robert D. Hales of the Quorum of the Twelve Apostles. Master of ceremonies for the jubilee, which was broadcast to surrounding stake centers and was immediately followed by a youth fireside, was Dave Checketts.

Hinckley dedicated the Manhattan New York Temple in four dedicatory sessions on Sunday, June 13, 2004. As part of the first dedicatory session, a special cornerstone laying ceremony was held, during which a time capsule containing memorabilia from New York, such as a copy of The New York Times and other church-related items, including a set of scriptures, a handkerchief used during the dedication ceremony, and sheet music, were placed within the cornerstone.

=== Pipe organ ===
The church commissioned organbuilder Sebastian M. Glück to design and build a new pipe organ for the New York Stake Center chapel in 2004. Tabernacle Organist Clay Christiansen collaborated in the design. This was Mr. Glück's first instrument built with slider-and-pallet windchests, a departure from his usual electro-pneumatic Pitman actions. The starkly modern instrument stands front and center in the chapel.

=== In the news ===
Coverage of the Manhattan Temple open house was extensive in comparison with most other recently completed temples. The temple was featured in most national newspapers, including The New York Times, The Washington Post, the Los Angeles Times, The Wall Street Journal, and USA Today, and in newspapers in Europe and Asia. It was also featured on CNN.

An anti-Mormon protest attended by many thousands of gay rights activists converged outside the temple on November 12, 2008, to protest the LDS Church's position in support of California's Proposition 8. No vandalism against the temple was reported.

== Renovations ==
On August 28, 2023, the church announced that the temple would close in 2024 for renovations that would take approximately three years. Local congregations who use the meetinghouse within the temple building would be relocated to other meetinghouse spaces in the area during the renovation period. The temple closed for renovations on March 2, 2024.

== Temple presidents ==
The church's temples are directed by a temple president and matron, each serving for a term of three years. The president and matron oversee the administration of temple operations and provide guidance and training for both temple patrons and staff.

The first president of the Manhattan New York Temple was John R. Stone, with the matron being Helen M. Stone. They served from 2004 to 2007. As of 2024, George K. Nixon is the president, with Patricia A. Nixon serving as matron.

== Admittance ==
On March 6, 2004, the church announced that a public open house would be held from May 8 to June 5, 2004 (excluding Sundays). The temple was dedicated by Gordon B. Hinckley on June 13, 2004. Like all temples of the church, the temple portion of this structure is not used for Sunday worship services, though the building it is housed in does serve as a meetinghouse for Sunday worship. To members of the church, temples are regarded as sacred houses of the Lord. Once dedicated, only church members with a current temple recommend can enter for worship.

In 2020, like all the church's temples, the Manhattan New York Temple was closed for a time in response to the COVID-19 pandemic.

== See also ==
- Steven D. Bennion, temple president, 2013–2016
- Comparison of temples of The Church of Jesus Christ of Latter-day Saints
- List of temples of The Church of Jesus Christ of Latter-day Saints
- List of temples of The Church of Jesus Christ of Latter-day Saints by geographic region
- Temple (LDS Church)
- Temple architecture (LDS Church)
