= Copenhagen Denmark Temple =

Operating temple of the Church of Jesus Christ of Latter-day Saints

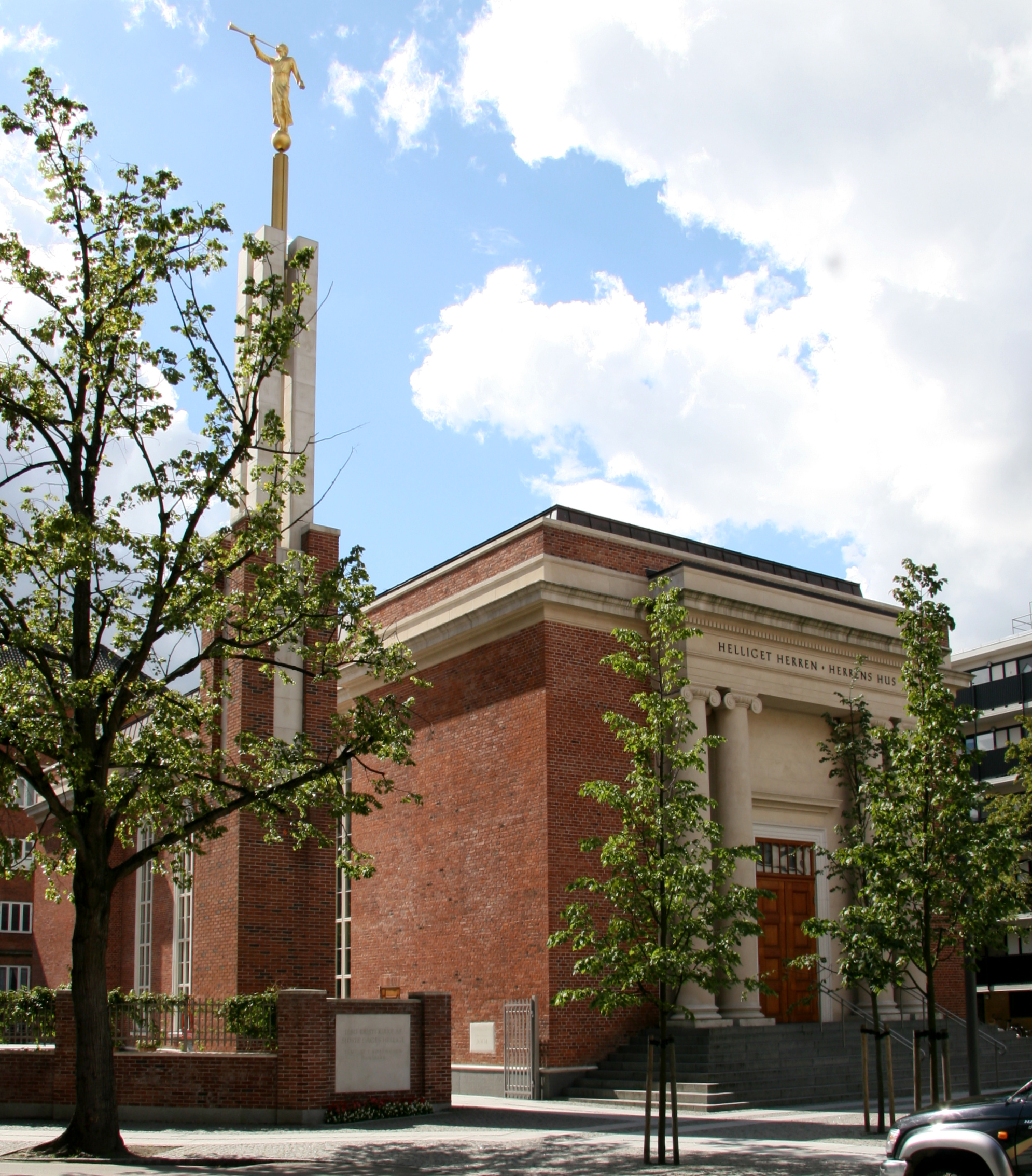
- Interactive map of Copenhagen Denmark Temple
- Number: 118
- Dedication: 23 May 2004, by Gordon B. Hinckley
- Site: 0.6 acres (0.24 ha)
- Floor area: 25,000 ft^{2} (2,300 m^{2})
- Official website • News & images

Church chronology
| ← Accra Ghana Temple | Copenhagen Denmark Temple | → Manhattan New York Temple |

Additional information
- Announced: 17 March 1999, by Gordon B. Hinckley
- Groundbreaking: 24 April 1999, by Spencer J. Condie
- Open house: 29 April – 15 May 2004
- Current president: Glen Tommy Michael Helmstad
- Designed by: Arcito
- Location: Frederiksberg, Denmark
- Coordinates: 55°41′33.63720″N 12°32′2.112000″E
- Exterior finish: Original brick and columns of meetinghouse dedicated in 1931
- Design: Neo-classical, detached single-spire design
- Baptistries: 1
- Ordinance rooms: 2 (two-stage progressive)
- Sealing rooms: 2

The Copenhagen Denmark Temple is the 118th operating temple of the Church of Jesus Christ of Latter-day Saints, and is located in Frederiksberg, Copenhagen. Originally built in 1931 as the Priorvej Chapel, the building served as a meetinghouse, a World War II air-raid shelter, and the site that housed the church's first stake in Scandinavia before being converted into a temple. The intent to convert the building into a temple was announced on March 17, 1999, and the site was dedicated the following month. Following construction, a public open house was held from April 29 to May 15, 2004, with more than 25,000 visitors touring the building. It was dedicated on May 23, 2004, by church president Gordon B. Hinckley.

The temple uses neo-classical architecture, retaining its redbrick façade and original front entrance while adding other elements like as a copper-clad dome above the celestial room, a reflecting pool, and gardens. Inside, it has two ordinance rooms, two sealing rooms, and a baptistry, with handcrafted furnishings and art-glass windows. The building stands on a site of less than one acre and was redesigned under the direction of the firm Arcito.

== History ==
Latter-day Saint missionaries first arrived in Copenhagen in 1850, making Denmark the first Scandinavian country to have church missionaries. The first branch began in September of the same year. Within a few years, hundreds of Danes had joined the church, and emigration to Utah became a defining feature of early Danish Latter-day Saint history.

The Priorvej Chapel in Frederiksberg was constructed and was dedicated by John A. Widtsoe of the Quorum of the Twelve Apostles on June 14, 1931. During World War II, the chapel was used as an air-raid shelter. In 1974, it became the site of the first stake in Scandinavia.

The intent to convert the meeting house to a temple was announced by the church's First Presidency on March 17, 1999. Rather than holding a traditional groundbreaking ceremony (due to the site being converted from a meetinghouse to a temple), the site was dedicated by Spencer J. Condie, president of the church's Europe North Area, on April 24, 1999, with nearly 700 in attendance.

During renovation, unexpected structural challenges—including a high water table—forced redesign. Changes included the demolition of auxiliary buildings, relocation of the baptismal font underground beneath a skylight, and the addition of a copper-clad dome over the celestial room. The exterior redbrick façade was preserved, and granite steps, a reflecting pool, and gardens were added. The angel Moroni statue was installed on top of the detached steeple on August 15, 2003.

After construction was completed, a public open house was held from April 29 to May 15, 2004, with approximately 25,510 visitors attending. Church missionaries received over 1,000 referrals, and an eight-foot replica of Bertel Thorvaldsen’s Christus statue was placed in the entry hall. During a special tour given to the occupants of apartments around the temple, a local resident said that the building was more beautiful due to fitting into the buildings around them, making it belong.

The temple was dedicated in four sessions on May 23, 2004, by church president Gordon B. Hinckley. Russell M. Nelson, then a member of the Quorum of the Twelve Apostles, also spoke at the dedication. Around 3,400 members from Denmark, Sweden, and Iceland participated. At the time, the temple districted included the Aarhus and Copenhagen stakes in Denmark, the Göteborg and Malmö stakes in Sweden, and the Iceland District.

In 2020, like all the church's others, the Copenhagen Denmark Temple was closed for a time in response to the COVID-19 pandemic. It later reopened in phases, resuming normal operations in April 2022.

== Design and architecture ==
The temple combines neo-classical architecture with adaptive reuse of the 1931 Priorvej Chapel. Located on a plot smaller than an acre in Frederiksberg, the site includes granite steps, a reflecting pool, and private gardens, enclosed by a brick wall.

The exterior preserves the chapel's original redbrick façade and entrance. A porch with four pillars frames the entry, designed to appear like Solomon's temple, while a detached spire is behind the main structure. On August 15, 2003, a gold-leafed angel Moroni statue was put on the steeple.

The 25,000-square-foot interior includes two endowment rooms, two sealing rooms, and a baptistry. Handcrafted furnishings, art-glass windows, murals depicting local landscapes, and a copper-clad dome above the celestial room are also included.[27] A skylight above the baptistry allows natural light to illuminate the baptismal font, which is supported by twelve fiberglass oxen.

== Temple presidents ==
The church's temples are directed by a temple president and matron, each typically serving for a term of three years. The president and matron oversee the administration of temple operations and provide guidance and training for both temple patrons and staff.

Serving from 2004 to 2007, Dee V. Jacobs was the first president, with Kay P. Jacobs serving as matron. As of 2024, the temple president and matron are Glen T. Helmstad and Ingegärd Ce. Helmstad.

== Admittance ==
Like all the church's temples, it is not used for Sunday worship services. To members of the church, temples are regarded as sacred houses of the Lord. Once dedicated, only church members with a current temple recommend can enter for worship.

== See also ==
- Comparison of temples of The Church of Jesus Christ of Latter-day Saints
- List of temples of The Church of Jesus Christ of Latter-day Saints
- List of temples of The Church of Jesus Christ of Latter-day Saints by geographic region
- Temple architecture (Latter-day Saints)
