= Robert Daines =

Robert Daines may refer to:

- Robert H. Daines (1905–1985), American academic and Latter-day Saint
- Robert H. Daines III (1934–2021), American academic and Latter-day Saint
- Robert M. Daines (born 1964), American lawyer and professor of law and business
