= Daines =

Daines is a surname. Notable people with the surname include:

- Barry Daines (born 1951), English football player
- Nicholas Daines, English gymnast and diver
- Percy Daines (1902–1957), English politician
- Richard F. Daines (1951–2011), American physician
- Robert H. Daines (1905–1985), American pathologist
- Robert H. Daines III (born 1934), American academic and Mormon leader
- Steve Daines (born 1962), American politician
