= William Fife (disambiguation) =

William Fife Jr. (1857–1944), also known as William Fife III, was the third generation of a family of Scottish yacht designers and builders.

William Fife may also refer to:

- William Paul Fife (1917–2008), American hyperbaric medicine specialist
- William N. Fife (1831–1915), American architect (father of William W. Fife)
- William W. Fife (1857–1897), American architect (son of William N. Fife)

== See also ==
- William Fyfe (disambiguation)
- William Fyffe (disambiguation)
