= Weber Stake Tabernacle =

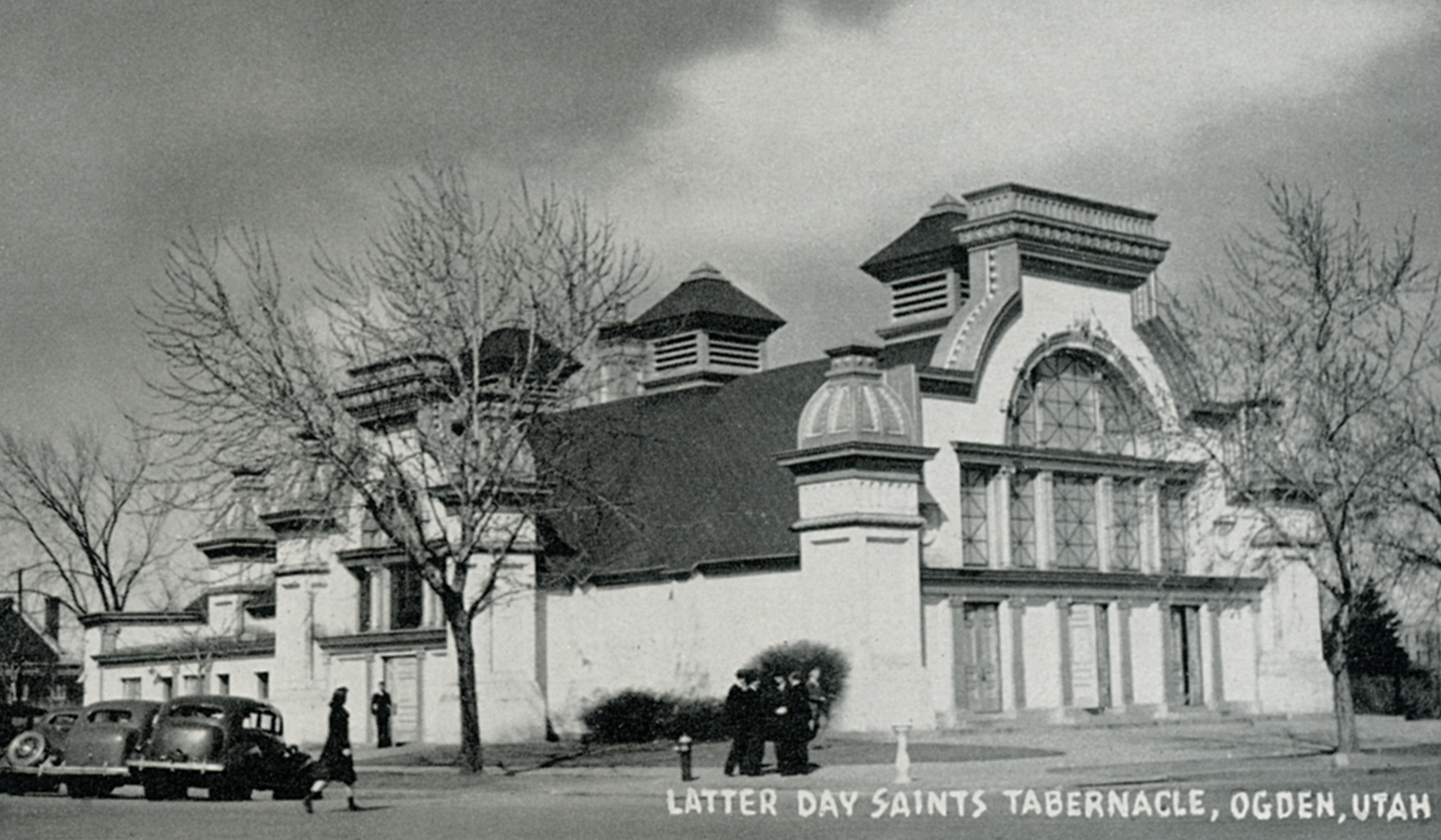
- The Tabernacle, circa 1940

Religion
- Affiliation: The Church of Jesus Christ of Latter-day Saints
- Status: Demolished (1971)

Location
- Location: Ogden, Utah, United States
- Interactive map of Weber Stake Tabernacle
- Coordinates: 41°13′37.75″N 111°58′14.48″W

Architecture
- Architect: William N. Fife
- Groundbreaking: 1855

The Weber Stake Tabernacle, later known as the Ogden Pioneer Tabernacle, was a tabernacle belonging to the Church of Jesus Christ of Latter-day Saints (LDS Church). The tabernacle was constructed by Latter-day Saints in Ogden, Utah during the 1850s. The building stood for over one-hundred years, until it was razed in 1971 to make way for the Ogden Utah Temple.

== History ==
The Weber Stake of the LDS Church was created in 1851, to serve as an administrative unit for various ward congregations in the area. For all the members to meet together, they needed a large meeting hall, and it was decided to build a tabernacle. William N. Fife was chosen as the architect and construction on the building began in 1855. Complications due to the Utah War slowed progress on the building, and the incomplete building was used as a meeting place by the Ogden division of the Utah Territorial Militia during that period. The building was eventually finished and was dedicated October 10, 1859. The block upon which the tabernacle was built became known as Tabernacle Square; the Ogden Third Ward would later construct its chapel and amusement hall on the southwest corner of the square, and in 1902 the Weber Stake Relief Society Building was constructed on the square. Besides stake conferences, the tabernacle would house some classes for Weber Stake Academy.

On May 12, 1884 ground was broken for a new tabernacle; this new tabernacle would be similar to the second Provo Tabernacle. Work was suspended on the new project not long after the foundation was laid, but was resurrected in 1905, only to be suspended again; this time permanently.

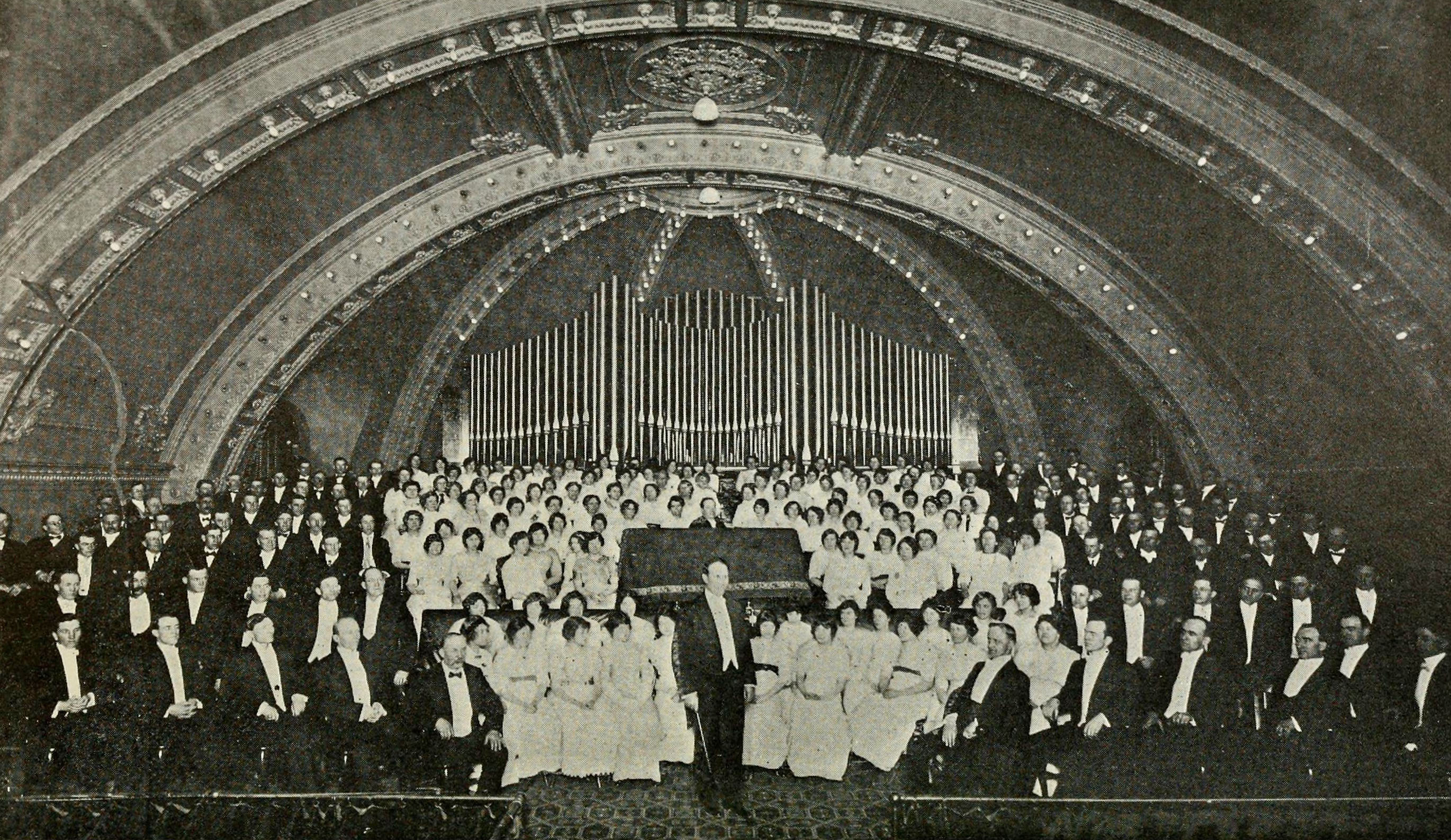
The Ogden Tabernacle Choir and Organ in 1914.

The tabernacle was remodeled by adding cupolas, new decorative entrances, and a semi-circle rear addition in 1896, and continued to serve as stake tabernacle until 1956 when a new tabernacle for the Ogden Stake was completed and dedicated. The old tabernacle was for a time abandoned, and then used as the local genealogical library for the Ogden Branch of the Genealogical Society of Utah from 1966 to 1971. The tabernacle was torn down beginning in August 1971 to allow landscaping to be completed prior to the open house of the Ogden Utah Temple.
