= Ogden Utah Temple =

Church of Jesus Christ of Latter-day Saints temple

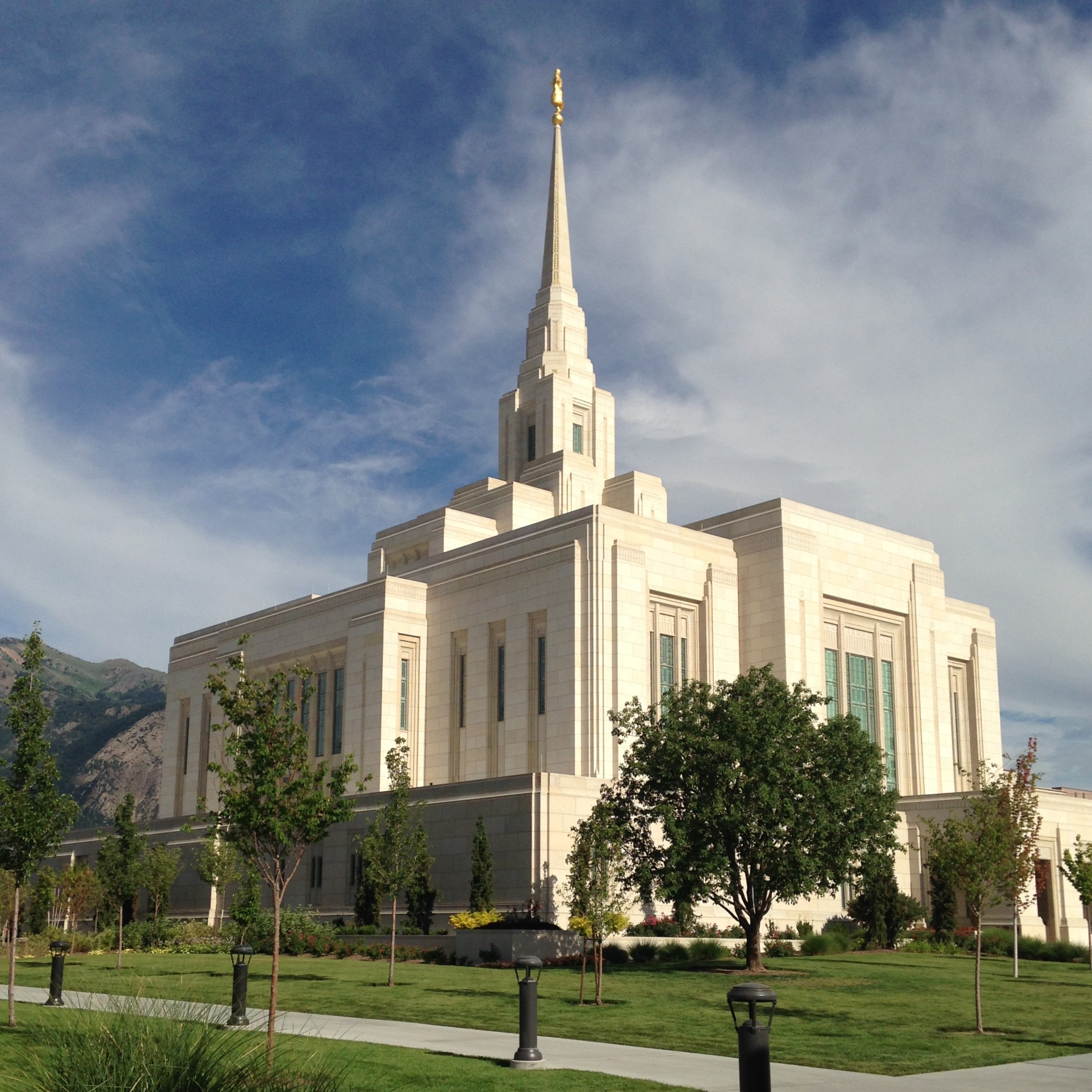
- Interactive map of Ogden Utah Temple
- Number: 14
- Dedication: January 18, 1972, by Joseph Fielding Smith
- Site: 9.96 acres (4.03 ha)
- Floor area: 112,232 ft^{2} (10,426.7 m^{2})
- Height: 180 ft (55 m)
- Official website • News & images

Church chronology
← Oakland California Temple	Ogden Utah Temple	→ Provo Utah Temple

Additional information
- Announced: August 24, 1967, by David O. McKay
- Groundbreaking: September 8, 1969, by Hugh B. Brown
- Open house: December 16–30, 1971 (original); August 1 – September 6, 2014 (after renovations)
- Rededicated: September 21, 2014, by Thomas S. Monson
- Designed by: Emil B. Fetzer
- Location: Ogden, Utah, United States
- Coordinates: 41°13′39.06840″N 111°58′17.04360″W
- Exterior finish: Mo-Sai stone facing
- Design: Modern, single-tower design
- Baptistries: 1
- Ordinance rooms: 6 (Movie, stationary)
- Sealing rooms: 11
- Clothing rental: Yes
- Notes: The temple was closed for 3 1/2 years to undergo renovations that significantly modified the look of the building. Following an open house from August 1 to September 6, 2014, the temple was rededicated on September 21, 2014.

The Ogden Utah Temple (formerly the Ogden Temple) is the sixteenth constructed and fourteenth operating temple of the Church of Jesus Christ of Latter-day Saints. Located in Ogden, Utah, it was originally built with a modern, single-spire design, similar to the Provo Utah Temple. The temples in Ogden and Provo were designed to be sister temples and are the only ones dedicated by church president Joseph Fielding Smith. The temple became the church’s fifth in Utah, and second along the Wasatch Front, dedicated almost 79 years after the Salt Lake Temple. It was the first to be dedicated in the state of Utah, as the previous ones were dedicated when Utah was still a territory.

The temple’s original design was crafted by Emil B. Fetzer with a modern architectural style. A groundbreaking ceremony, to signify the beginning of construction, was held on September 8, 1969, conducted by N. Eldon Tanner. The temple was dedicated by Smith in six sessions from January 18-20, 1972. During a renovation completed in 2014, the exterior and interior were extensively changed. The temple was rededicated on September 21, 2014, by Thomas S. Monson in three sessions.

== History ==
The temples in Ogden and Provo were planned due to overcrowding in the Salt Lake, Manti, and Logan temples. The intent to construct a temple in Ogden was announced by the First Presidency on August 24, 1967. The Provo Temple was also announced that day, marking the first time in church history that two temples were announced on the same day. A groundbreaking ceremony, signifying the beginning of construction, was held on September 8, 1969, with Tanner presiding. Joseph Fielding Smith offered the dedicatory prayer, and Hugh B. Brown broke the ground. On September 7, 1970, a cornerstone-laying ceremony was held.

The site was a 10-acre (40,000 m^{2}) lot called Tabernacle Square that the church had owned since the area was settled. In 1921, church president Heber J. Grant inspected it as a possible temple site, but decided the time was not right to build.

At the time of construction, the Ogden Temple differed from those built previously. The original design was very contemporary and the lot chosen was in downtown Ogden, surrounded by businesses and offices.

The Ogden Temple was dedicated on January 18-20, 1972, by church president Joseph Fielding Smith, a few weeks before the Provo Temple was dedicated.

In 2020, like all the church's other temples, the temple was closed for a time in response to the coronavirus pandemic.

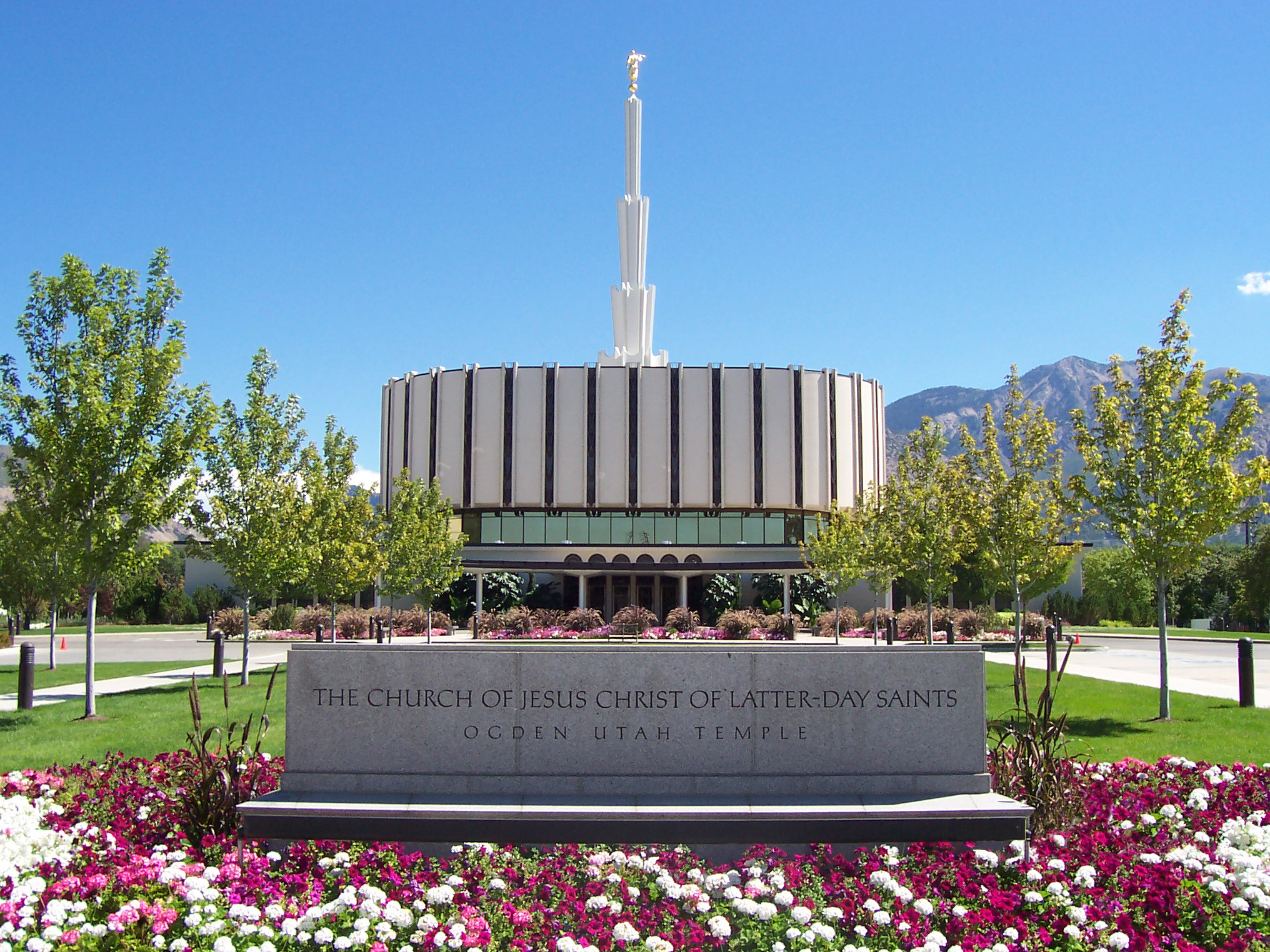
The temple as originally built

The Ogden Temple was originally constructed with 115,000 square feet (10,700 m^{2}) and four floors, one below ground. The temple included six ordinance rooms and eleven sealing rooms. The stone on the temple was fluted and decorative metal grillwork was added between the stone. Gold windows with directional glass also added to the beauty of the temple.

=== Renovations ===
Several renovations have occurred to strengthen the temple's structural integrity, update facilities, and enhance its spiritual and aesthetic appeal. The most significant renovation project commenced in 2011.

In 2001 and 2002, both the exterior of the temple and the surrounding grounds underwent significant changes. Weather damage to the exterior of the temple was repaired and the spire, which was originally a yellowish-gold, was painted bright white. A fiberglass statue of the angel Moroni covered in gold leaf was added to the temple's spire, almost 30 years after the temple was dedicated.

On February 17, 2010, the church announced that major exterior and interior renovations that would significantly modify the look of the temple. The temple was closed for these renovations on April 2, 2011. The upgrades included replacing electrical, heating, and plumbing systems with modern, energy-saving equipment. The structure was also strengthened to meet new seismic requirements. Additional improvements included construction of a new underground parking structure, complete relandscaping of the temple block, and renovation of the adjacent Ogden Tabernacle, including removal of its spire and the addition of a new pipe organ, which was created by the same builder who constructed the organ in the church’s Conference Center. The renovation project largely demolished the original temple, leaving only the foundation and some walls as remaining sections.

The temple's interior was reduced from 131,000 to 115,000 sq ft, but through an improved design, there is more usable space following the reconstruction. These changes were made to ensure the temple's compliance with contemporary building standards and to accommodate the evolving needs of the church and its members.

The most visible aspect of the renovation was the complete reconstruction of the temple’s exterior. This modernized the temple’s outward appearance, bringing it in line with more recent temples, such as the Draper Utah Temple. The Ogden Utah Temple renovation project differed greatly from other recent temple renovations, in that the new design bore little resemblance to the original temple design.

On April 25, 2014, the church announced that with renovations nearing completion, a public open house would be held from August 1 to September 6, 2014. The temple was rededicated in three sessions on September 21, 2014, by church president Thomas S. Monson.

== Design and architecture ==
The building was designed to look timeless and modern, but still in line with traditional Latter-day Saint temple design. The original design was by Emil B. Fetzer, with the renovated version designed by Richardson Design Partnership. The temple's architecture reflects the cultural heritage of the Wasatch Front and the spiritual significance to the church.

=== Site ===
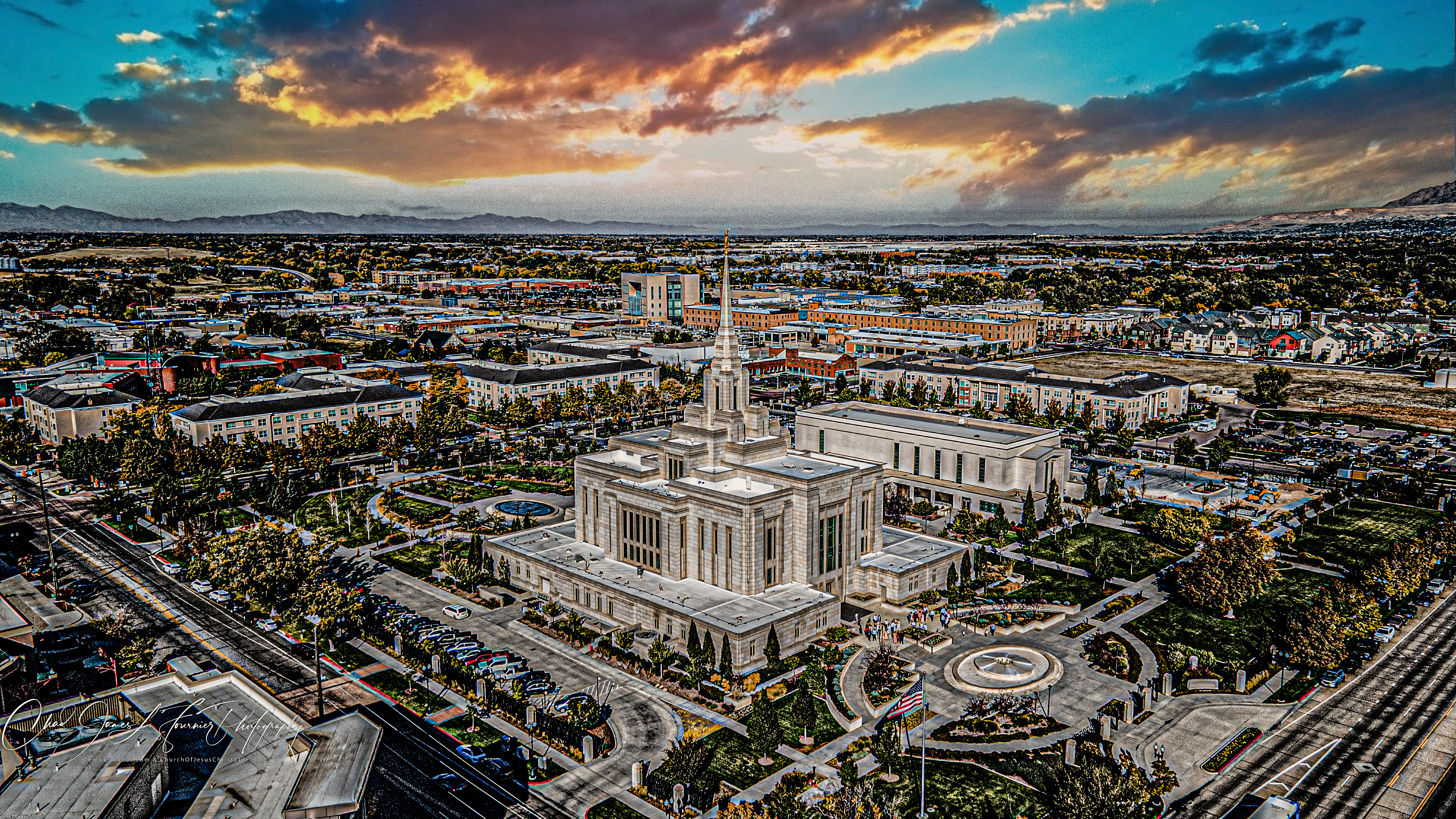
Ogden Utah Temple

The temple sits on a 9.96-acre plot, and the surrounding landscaping includes a large water fountain. These elements are designed to provide a tranquil setting that enhances the sacred atmosphere of the site.

=== Exterior ===
The structure is four stories tall, constructed with granite. The exterior has a central single spire and gold statue of the angel Moroni, two elements chosen for their symbolic significance and alignment with temple traditions. The design incorporates elements that are reflective of both the local culture and the broader church symbolism.

=== Interior ===
The interior has stained glass and decorative carpets, both of which make use of a desert rose and prairie grass motif. There are also a number of paintings throughout the temple, which feature Christ as a central figure or nature scenes related to the outside landscape. The temple’s celestial room is intended to create a spiritually uplifting environment, and features a lighted glass dome surrounded by four chandeliers. The temple includes six ordinance rooms and 11 sealing rooms. The temple was the first to have six ordinance rooms. It remains one of only four temples to have six ordinance rooms; the others being the Provo Utah, Jordan River, and Washington D.C. temples.

=== Symbols ===
The design has symbolic elements representing Biblical connections to Latter-day Saint theology. For example, the temple’s single spire is meant to invoke Exodus 13:21, in which God appears as a pillar of cloud and then a pillar of fire in order to lead his followers. Additionally, the desert rose motif used throughout the temple’s interior symbolizes “the prophecy in Isaiah about the desert blossoming as the rose, imagery that inspired the Mormon pioneers who settled Utah and areas of the Mountain West.”

== Temple presidents ==
All of the church's temples are overseen by temple president and matron, who typically serving for three years. The temple president and matron are responsible for the administration of temple operations and spiritual guidance for both the patrons and staff.

The first temple president and matron in Ogden were Andrew R. Halversen and Luana P. Halversen, who served from 1972 to 1976. As of 2024, Kent J. Arrington and Michele K. Arrington are serving as temple president and matron.

== Admittance ==
Prior to its dedication, an open house was held from December 16-30, 1971, during which time over 150,000 people visited the temple. After the open house, the temple was dedicated from January 18-20, 1972, by Joseph Fielding Smith, and subsequently closed to the general public.

Following the temple’s renovation and before its rededication another open house was held from August 1 to September 6, 2014. During this open house, the church reported between 500 and 600 thousand visitors toured the temple. The temple was rededicated on September 21, 2014, by Thomas S. Monson.

Like all others in the church's, the Ogden Temple is not used for Sunday worship services. To members of the church, temples are regarded as sacred houses of the Lord. Once dedicated, only church members with a current temple recommend can enter for worship.

== Other structures on the block ==
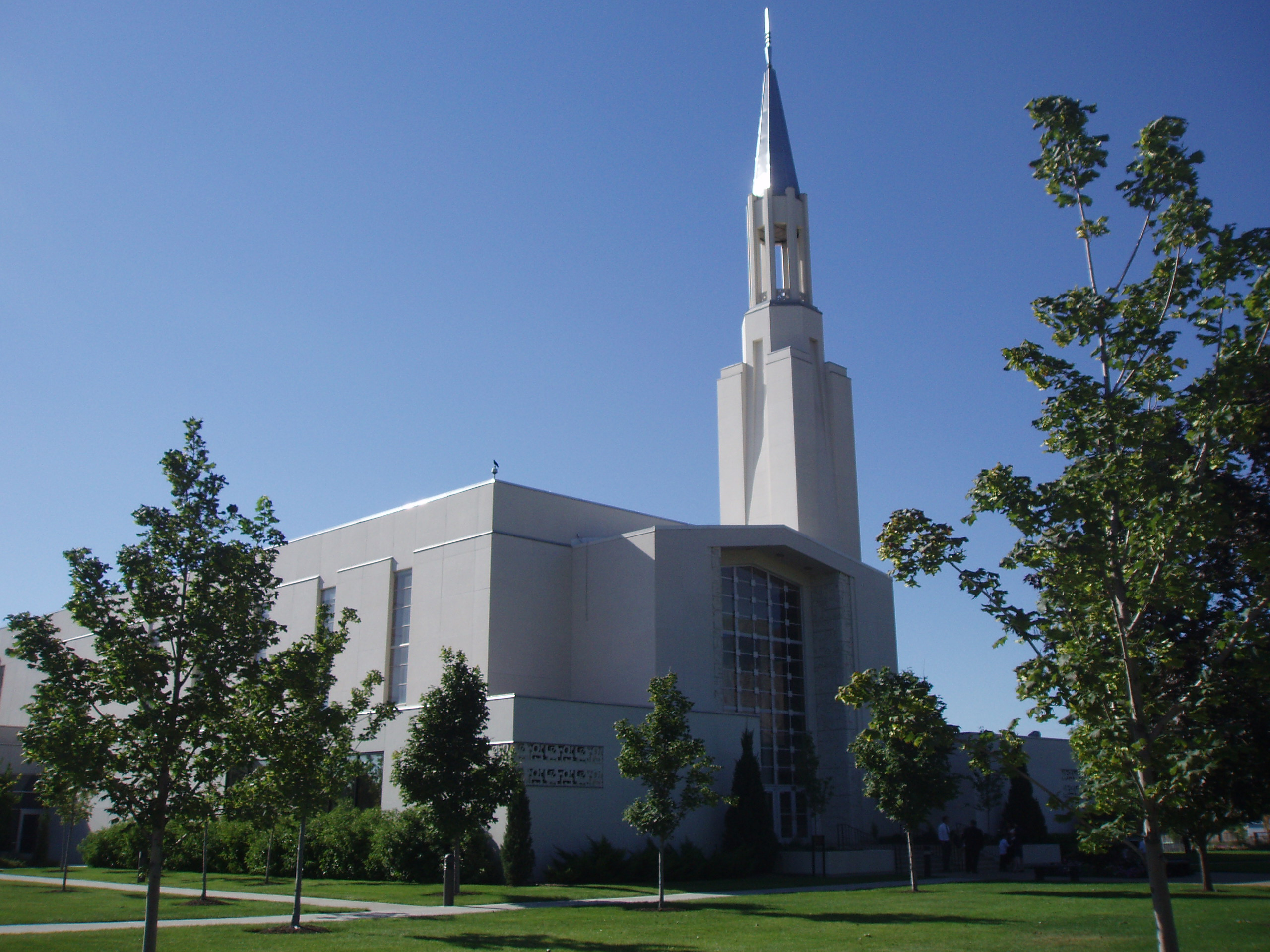
Ogden Stake Tabernacle, Ogden, Utah prior to removal of tower.

Other buildings are, and have been previously, located on the same block as the temple. The first building constructed was the Weber Stake Tabernacle (1855) on the southeast corner of the block. It was demolished in 1971 in conjunction with the construction of the temple.

The Weber Stake Relief Society Building, completed in 1902, was located on the western portion of the block. It was deeded to the Weber County Daughters of the Utah Pioneers in 1926, who used it as a pioneer museum. In January 2012, it was moved approximately one block west to a lot donated by the City of Ogden. The move was to accommodate a new parking structure built as a part of the temple remodel.

The Miles Goodyear Cabin was located adjacent to the Weber Stake Relief Society Building as part of the pioneer museum from 1928 to late 2011, when it was moved to the new pioneer museum location.

The largest of the other structures on site is the Ogden Stake Tabernacle, constructed from 1953 to 1955, and dedicated by President McKay on February 12, 1956. The large tower on the north side of the building was removed during the renovation completed in 2014.

== See also ==
Temples in Utah
Wasatch Front Temples
Temples along the Wasatch Front
- = Operating
- = Under construction
- = Announced
- = Temporarily Closed

- The Church of Jesus Christ of Latter-day Saints in Utah
- Comparison of temples of The Church of Jesus Christ of Latter-day Saints
- List of temples of The Church of Jesus Christ of Latter-day Saints
- List of temples of The Church of Jesus Christ of Latter-day Saints by geographic region
- Temple architecture (Latter-day Saints)
