= William Fyffe =

Will or William Fyffe may refer to:

- Will Fyffe (1885–1947), Scottish music hall and film actor-songwriter
- William Samuel Fyffe (1914–1989), Northern Ireland unionist politician
- William C. Fyffe (1929–2000), American TV news executive and consultant

== See also ==
- William Fyfe (disambiguation)
- William Fife (disambiguation)
