= Emil B. Fetzer =

American architect

Head architect of the Church of Jesus Christ of Latter-day Saints
- 1965 – 1986
- Called by: David O. McKay

Personal details
- Born: Emil Baer Fetzer; January 4, 1916
- Died: November 2, 2009 (aged 93)
- Spouse(s): June A. Seyfarth
- Parents: John Fetzer Sr. Margaret Baer Fetzer

Emil Baer Fetzer (January 4, 1916 – November 2, 2009) was an American architect and the head architect of the Church of Jesus Christ of Latter-day Saints (LDS Church) from 1965 to his retirement in 1986.

== Architectural training ==
Fetzer received a degree in architecture from the University of Southern California in 1943. He then went to work for the architectural firm of Fetzer and Fetzer in Salt Lake City, Utah, which included his father, John Fetzer, Sr., and his uncle, Henry. Some of his first works were Brockbank Junior High in Magna, Utah, and Union High School in Roosevelt, Utah. On the campus of Brigham Young University he designed the Smoot Administration Building and the Spencer W. Kimball Tower.

== Church architect ==
In 1965, Fetzer was appointed as the LDS Church's architect by its president, David O. McKay. He was the architect for LDS Church's temples on five continents. Those he designed outside the U.S. include the Mexico City Mexico, Sao Paulo Brazil, Santiago Chile, Freiberg Germany, Sydney Australia, and Tokyo Japan temples. In Oceania, he designed the Nuku'alofa Tonga Temple and was the initial architect of the Papeete Tahiti Temple. He was also involved with the planning for the first Apia Samoa Temple. He was influenced in his design of the Mexico City Mexico Temple by ancient Mayan temples.

In the U.S., he designed the Atlanta Georgia, Jordan River Utah, Provo Utah, Ogden Utah, and Seattle Washington temples. He was the general supervising architect for the Washington DC Temple. Fetzer also designed the building that houses the Manhattan New York Temple, although the temple itself and spire were constructed 18 years after his retirement.

All the temples designed by Fetzer include single spires (see Temple architecture (LDS Church)). Many of these temples (including those in Tonga, Samoa, Tahiti, Australia, and Chile) are similar in floor plan, but differ slightly for a locale-specific flair. The Ogden and Provo temples had nearly identical exteriors with large orange central spires that symbolized the pillar of fire by night, then set upon a large white building that represented the pillar of cloud by day, referring to the Israelites in their exodus from Egypt spoken of in Exodus 13:21–22. The spires of the Ogden and Provo temples were later painted white.

Other buildings he designed include the previous South Visitors' Center on Temple Square. Fetzer was also the general supervisor of the refurbishing of the Salt Lake Assembly Hall.

== Personal life ==
Fetzer was the son of John Fetzer, Sr. (one of six architects of the Idaho Falls Temple) and Margaret Baer. He was the brother of Primary song composer Elizabeth Fetzer Bates. He married June Alma Seyfarth on June 14, 1940, in the Salt Lake Temple. Fetzer died of causes incident to age.

== Selected works ==
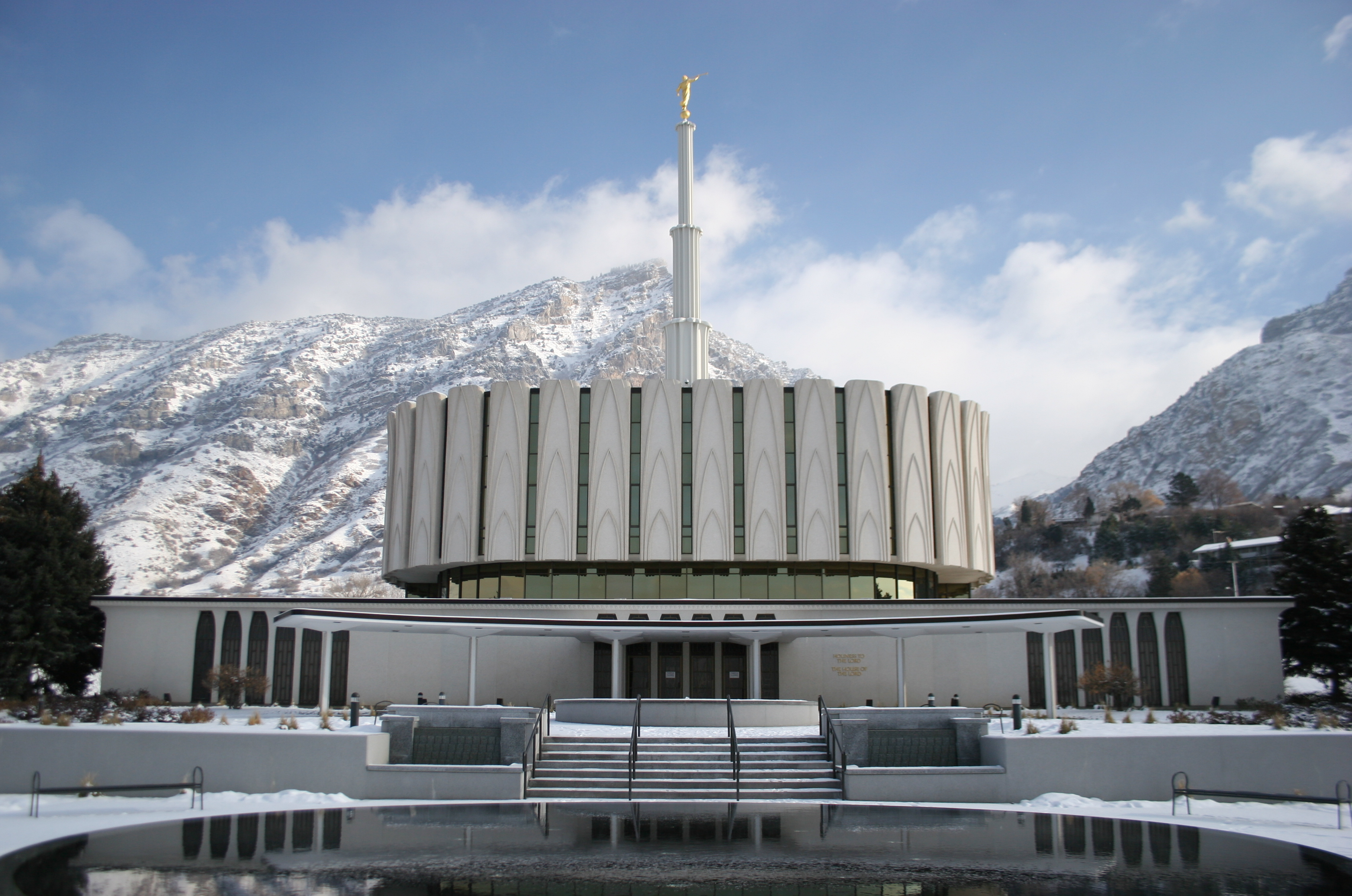
Provo Utah Temple (1972)

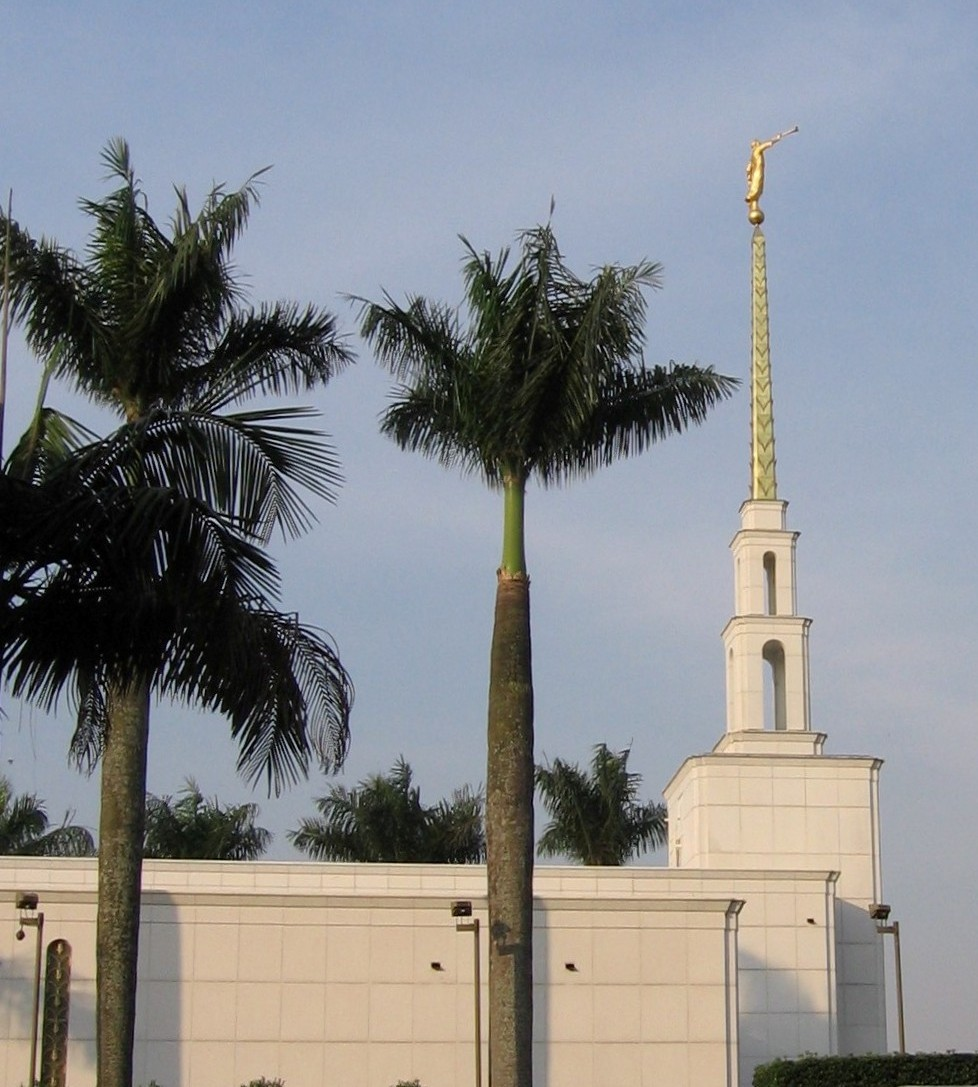
Sao Paulo Brazil Temple (1978)

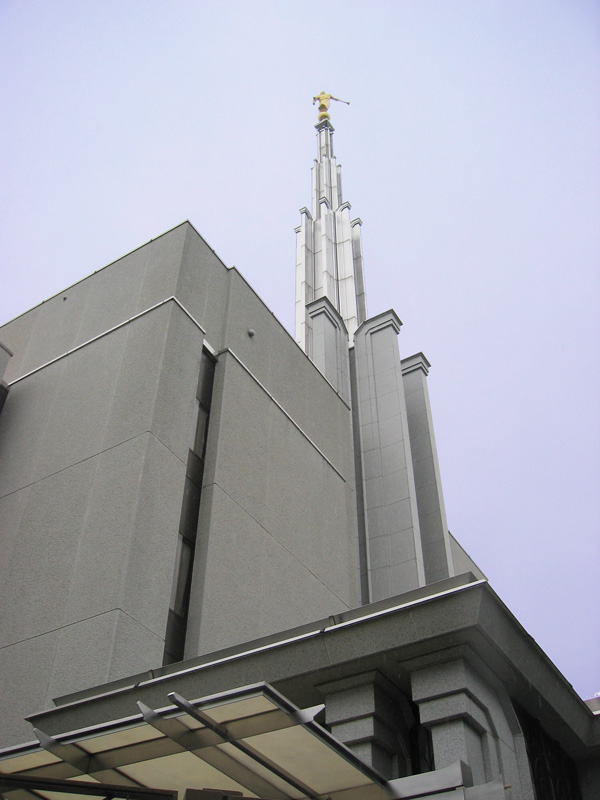
Tokyo Japan Temple (1980)

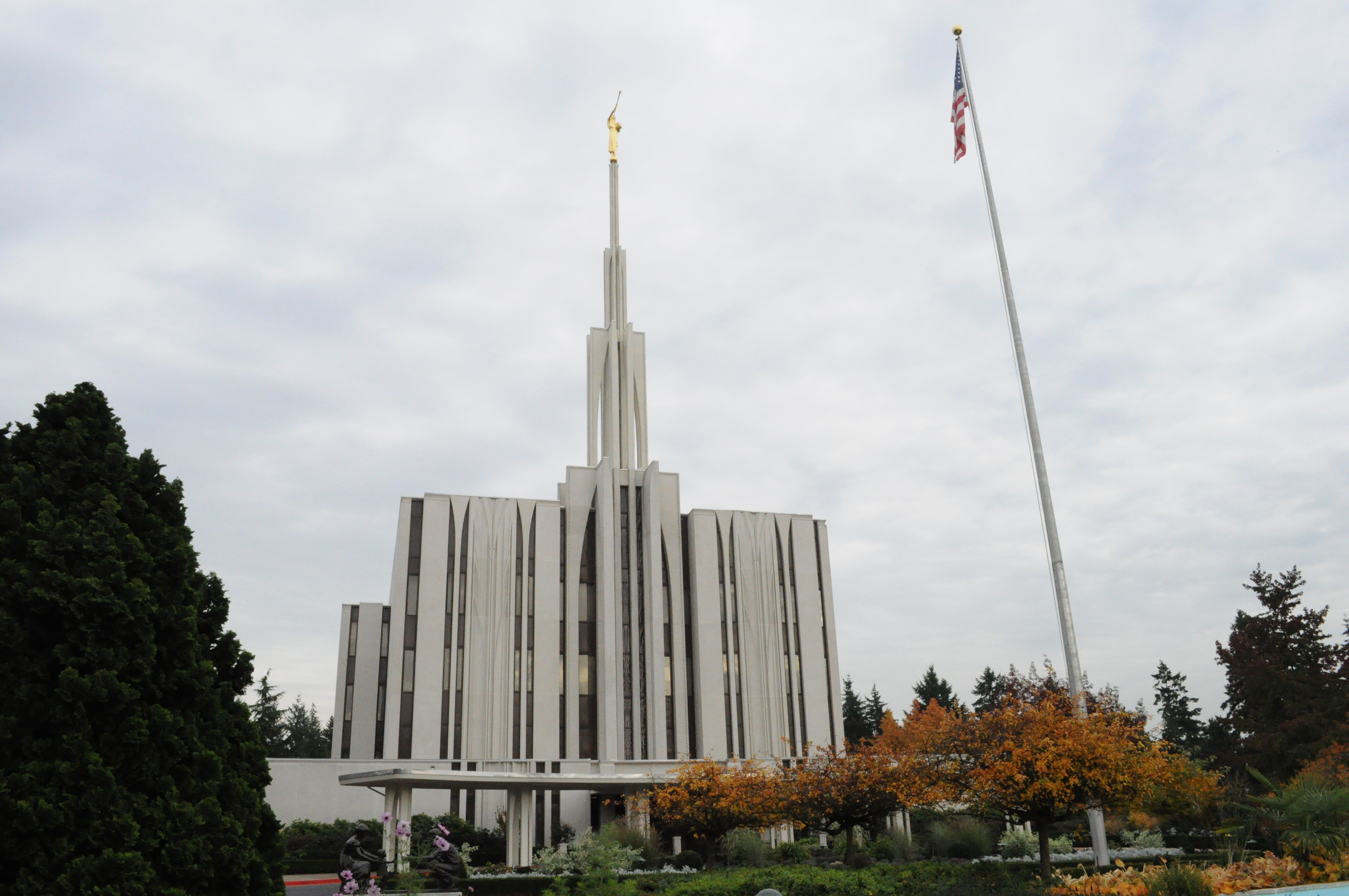
Seattle Washington Temple (1980)

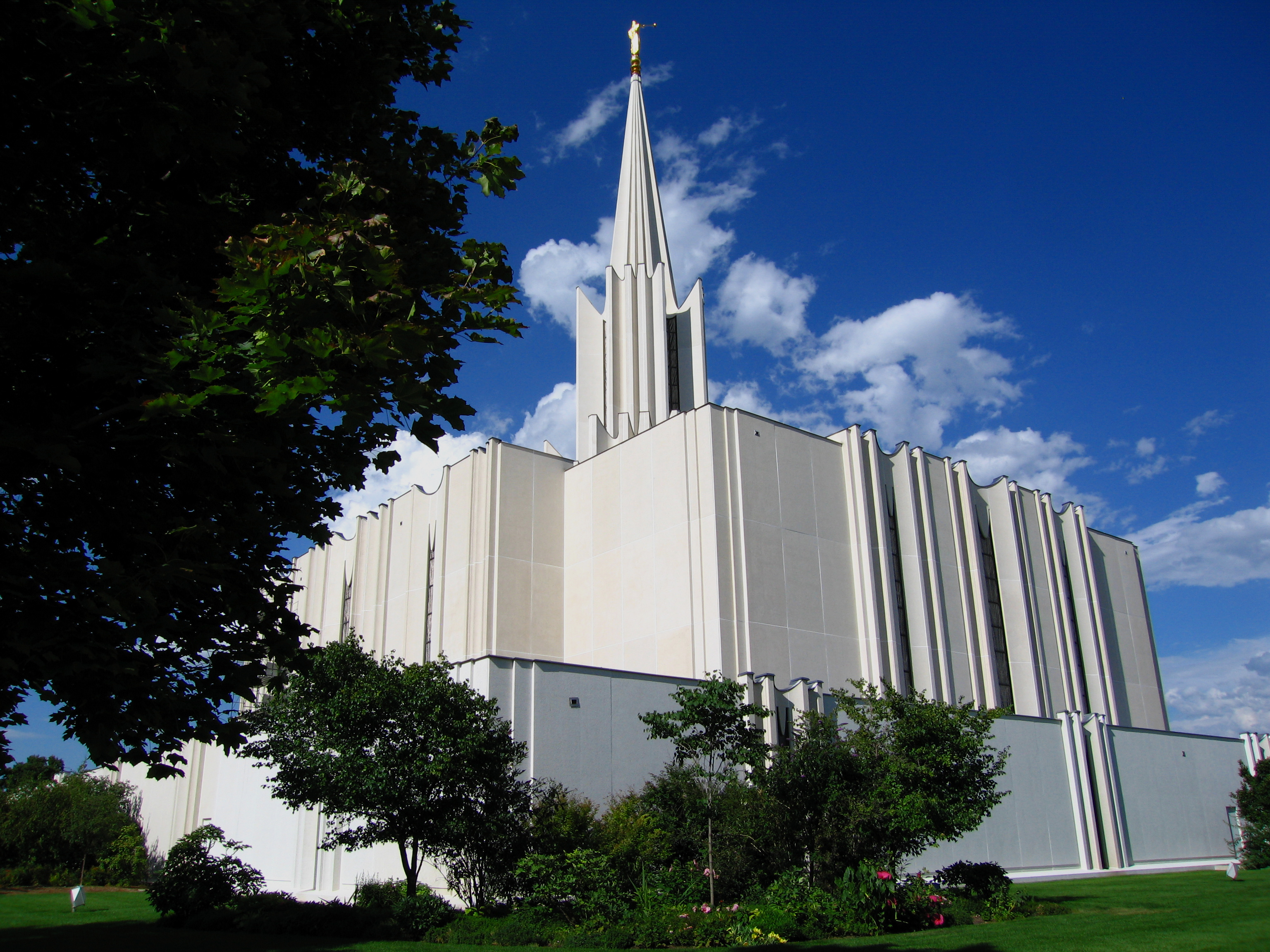
Jordan River Temple (1981)

Atlanta Georgia Temple (1983)

Nuku'alofa Tonga Temple (1983)

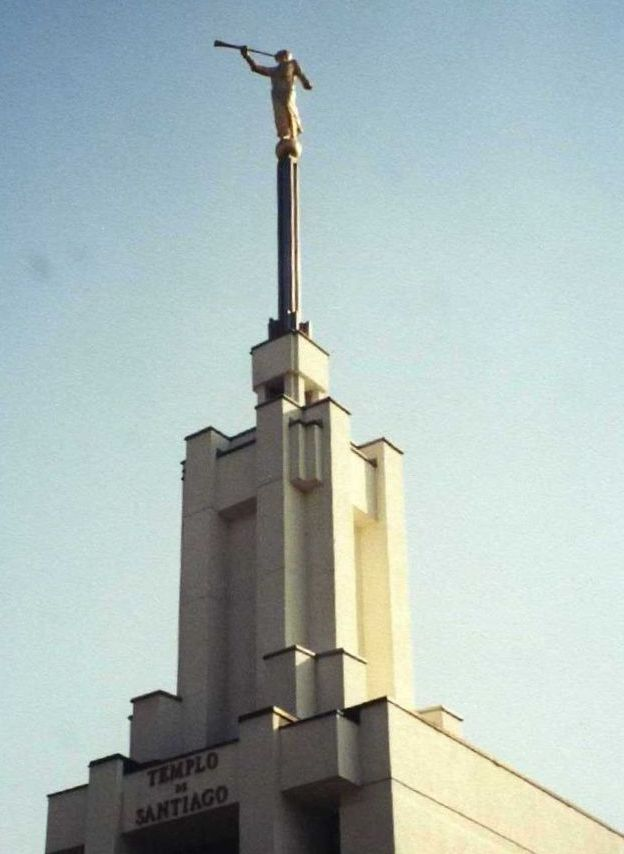
Santiago Chile Temple (1983)

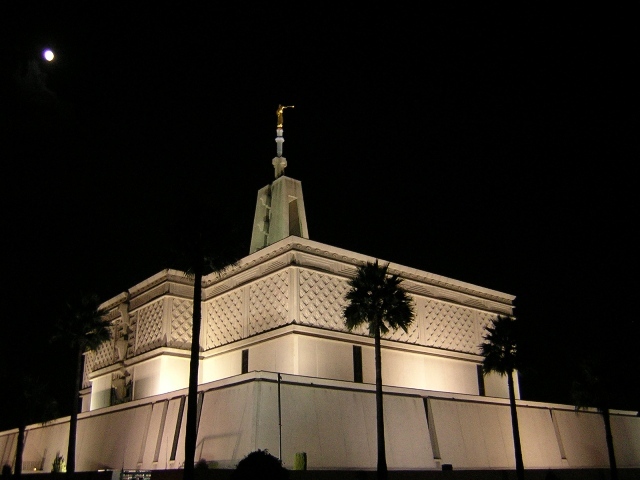
Mexico City Mexico Temple (1983)

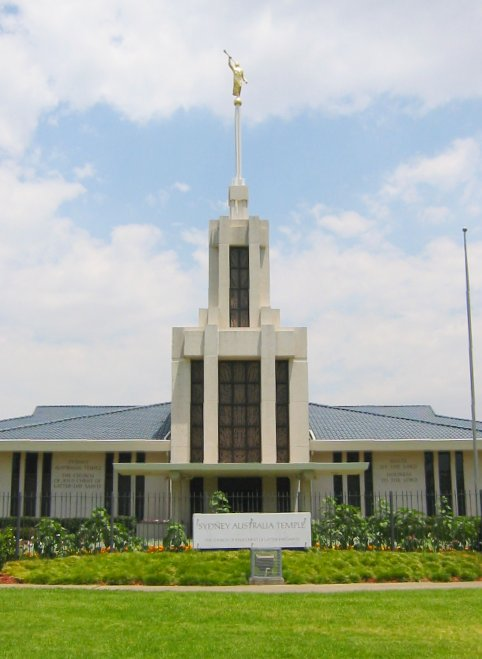
Sydney Australia Temple (1984)

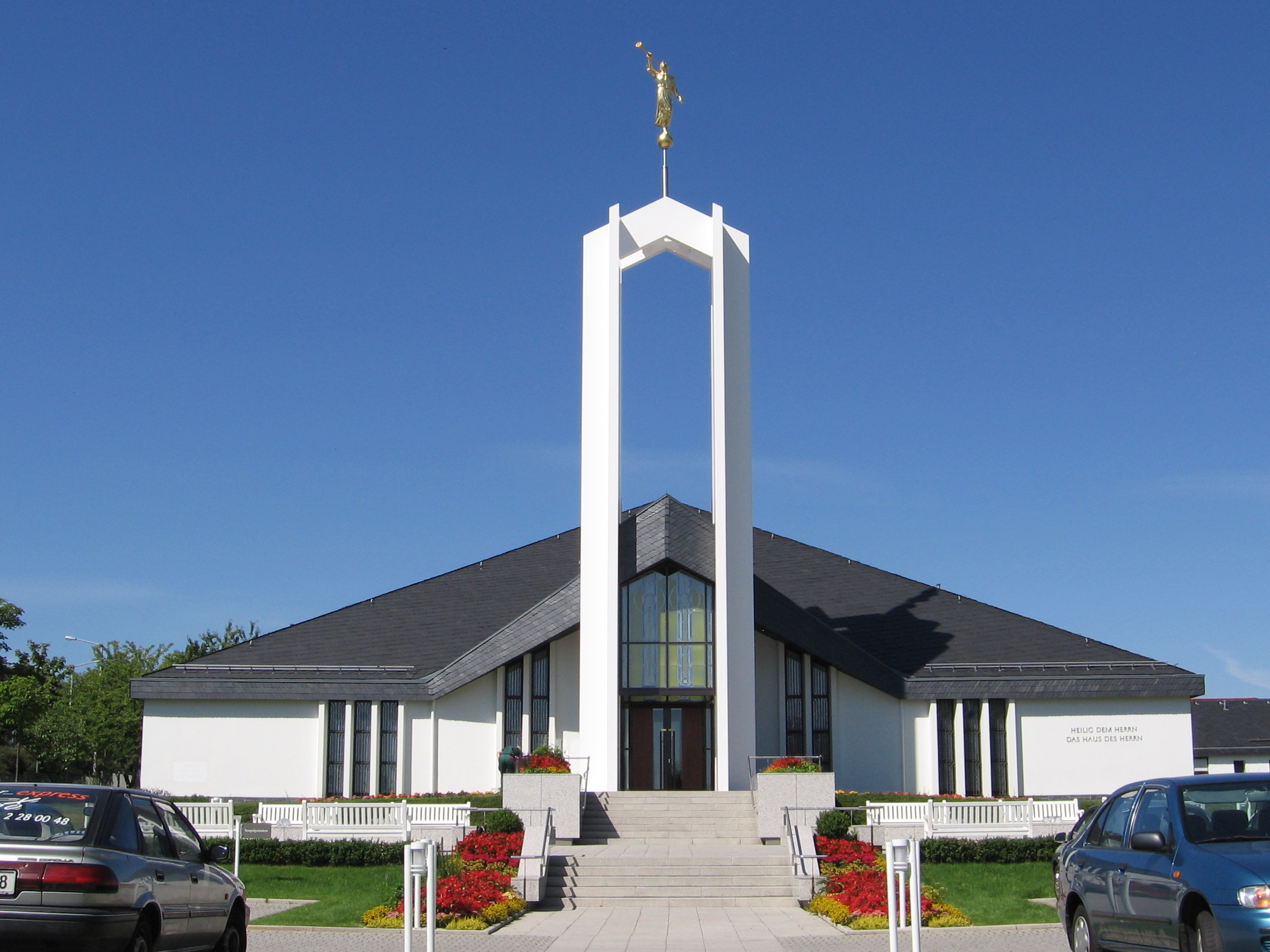
Freiberg Germany Temple (1985)
