= Miles Goodyear Cabin =

Historic house in Utah, United States

- Goodyear, Miles, Cabin
- U.S. National Register of Historic Places
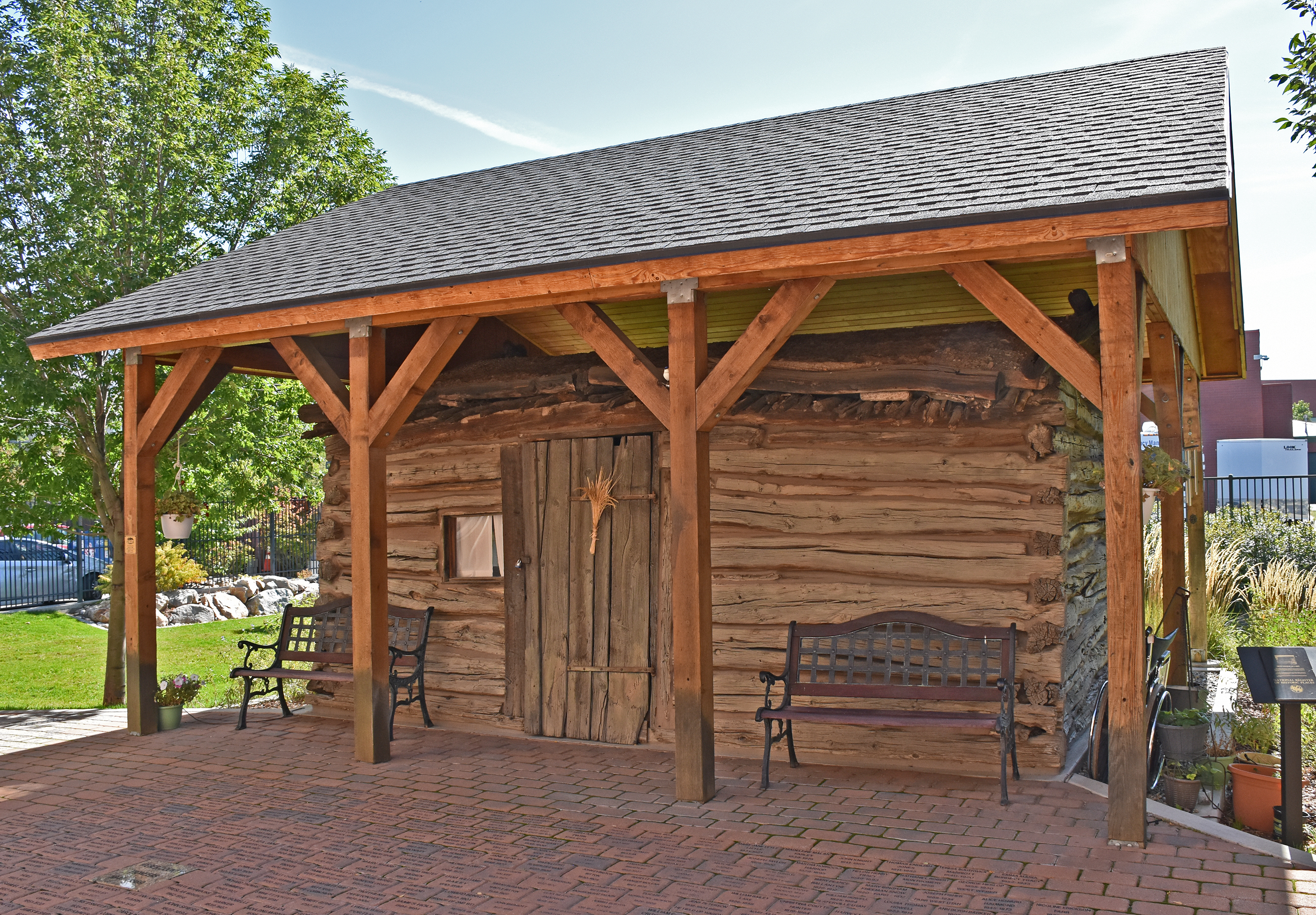
- Miles Goodyear Cabin

- Location within Utah Location within the United States
- Location: Daughters of Utah Pioneers Museum, Ogden, Utah
- Coordinates: 41°13′43.45″N 111°58′31.87″W
- Built: 1845
- Built by: Miles Goodyear
- NRHP reference No.: 71000866
- Added to NRHP: February 24, 1971

The Miles Goodyear Cabin is a historic building in Ogden, Utah, built by trapper and trader Miles Goodyear on the Weber River in 1845 and was the foundation of the first permanent European settlement in Utah. It is the oldest building in the state of Utah not built by Native Americans. The cabin is constructed of sawn cottonwood logs, measuring roughly 14.33 feet (4.37 m) by 17.75 feet (5.41 m).

== History ==
The cabin was built in 1845 by Miles Goodyear at a location he called Fort Buenaventura. The fort also included a stockade, garden, and fruit trees. In 1847 the fort was sold to Mormon settlers, along with livestock and the surrounding area for $1,950 (equivalent to about $67,379 in 2025). In the 1850s the cabin was sold and moved. It was moved several more times during the next 50 years to various locations along Washington Avenue in Ogden.

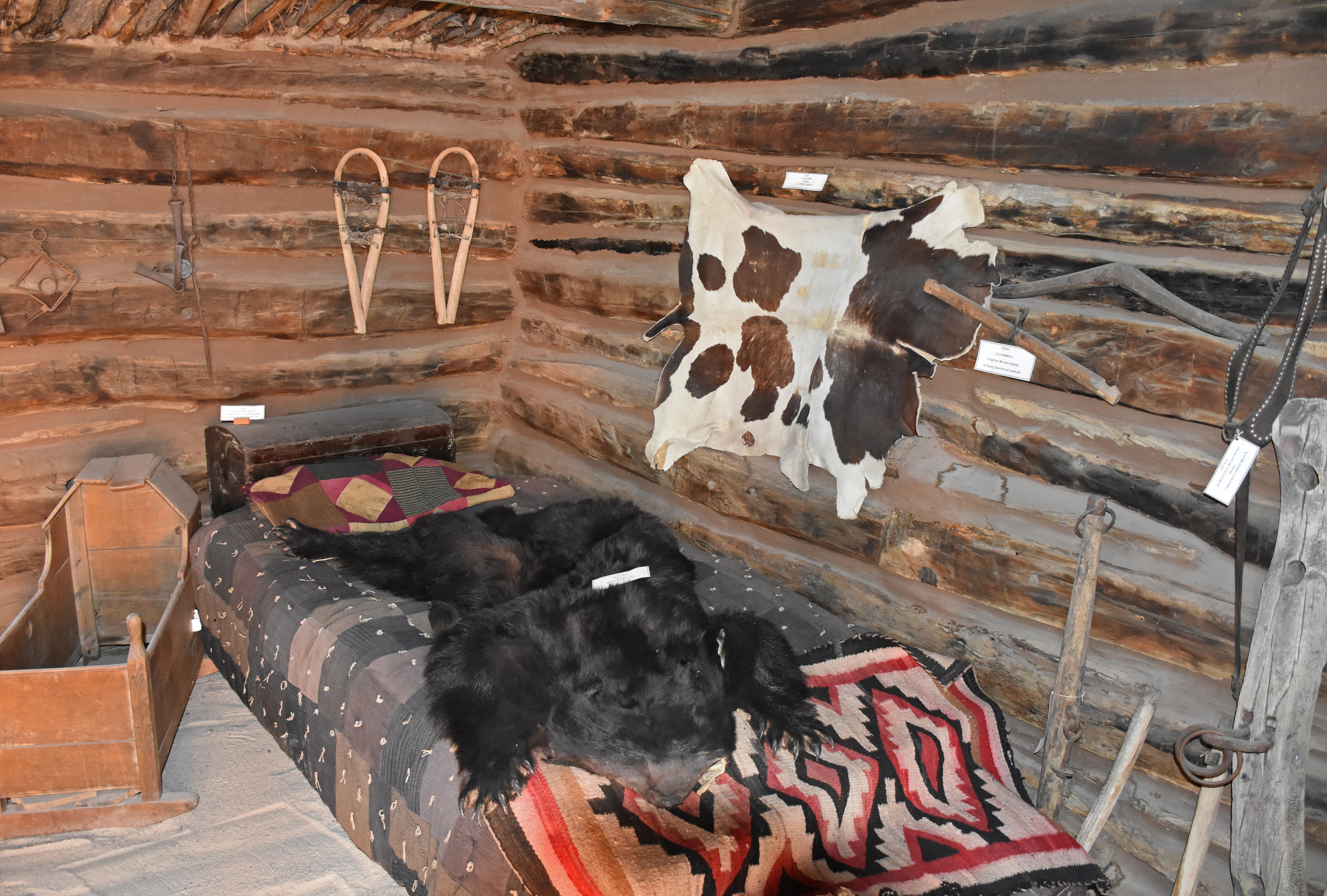
Interior of the cabin

In 1919 it was donated to the Daughters of Utah Pioneers and was displayed on a parade float. It was then moved to a location behind Fire Station #3 (also on Washington Avenue). In 1928, it was moved to Tabernacle Square next to the Daughters of Utah Pioneers Museum. It was moved again in 2011–2012, along with the museum to a lot on the corner of 21st and Lincoln Avenue, as part of the remodel of the Ogden Utah Temple.

The cabin was placed on the National Register of Historic Places in 1971. The submission paperwork notes that the roof is not original, and some of the logs were replaced after they had rotted.

During 1994-1995 the cabin was refurbished. It was dismantled, the logs were treated with a preservative, and it was reassembled.
