= Miles Goodyear =

American fur trader and mountain man (1817–1849)

Miles Morris Goodyear (February 24, 1817 – November 12, 1849) was an American fur trader and mountain man who built and occupied Fort Buenaventura in what is now the city of Ogden, Utah. The fort was located approximately two miles south of the confluence of the Weber and Ogden rivers and about one-quarter mile west of the end of Ogden's modern 28th Street. Goodyear was the first recorded man of European descent to live in the Weber Valley of Utah.

Born in Hamden, Connecticut, Goodyear was orphaned at the age of four and served as an indentured servant for much of his youth. In Independence, Missouri, when he was nineteen, he joined the 1836 Whitman-Spaulding missionary party traveling west on the Oregon Trail. As described by his fellow travelers, the young Goodyear was "thin and spare", with "light flaxen hair, light blue eyes". In later years, Goodyear's hair was described as red. Goodyear left the party at Fort Hall, in modern southeastern Idaho.

For the next decade, Goodyear worked as an independent or "free" trapper, being unaffiliated with any of the major American or Canadian fur companies. He lived, for a time, with the Bannock Indians of southern Idaho. He traded in the Western mountains and visited various gatherings of mountain men and Indians, including the rendezvous of 1841. By 1839 he had married Pomona, daughter of the Ute Chief Pe-teet-neet. The couple had two children, William Miles and Mary Eliza.

Adapting to the progressive decline of the fur trade and the increase in emigrant traffic on the overland trails, Goodyear built a way station on a large westward bend of the Weber River. The enclosed fort, constructed with local cottonwood logs, was begun in 1845 and completed by the end of 1846. Four log cabins occupied the corners of the fort, with sheds, corrals, and a garden within the enclosure. Additional corrals outside the walls accommodated cattle, horses, goats, and sheep. Occupied by Goodyear and his family and a number of Native American slaves, as well as visiting trappers and emigrants, the fort served as a base for the rapidly diminishing fur trade in the Wasatch Mountains and as a meeting and trading post for overland emigrants.

In the winter of 1846–1847, Goodyear traveled to California to acquire horses for trade. In 1847, he drove the herd east toward Missouri, trading along the trails. During this trip, in July of that year, Goodyear visited with the first Mormon pioneer company on the Bear River west of Fort Bridger. He urged Brigham Young and other Mormon leaders to settle on lands near the Weber River. His efforts were initially unsuccessful, but in November 1847 the LDS High Council of Great Salt Lake City was authorized to force the purchase of Fort Buenaventura. The resulting permanent settlement soon expanded and was initially called Brownsville, after Captain James Brown. The city was later renamed Ogden after another early trapper, Peter Skene Ogden.

Retaining his remaining horse herd, Goodyear and his family moved to California and engaged in horse-trading and gold mining. He acquired land at Benicia and made a gold discovery on the Yuba River at "Goodyear's Bar". He died in the Sierra Nevada on November 12, 1849, at the age of thirty-two. He was buried at Benicia, California.

== Monument ==
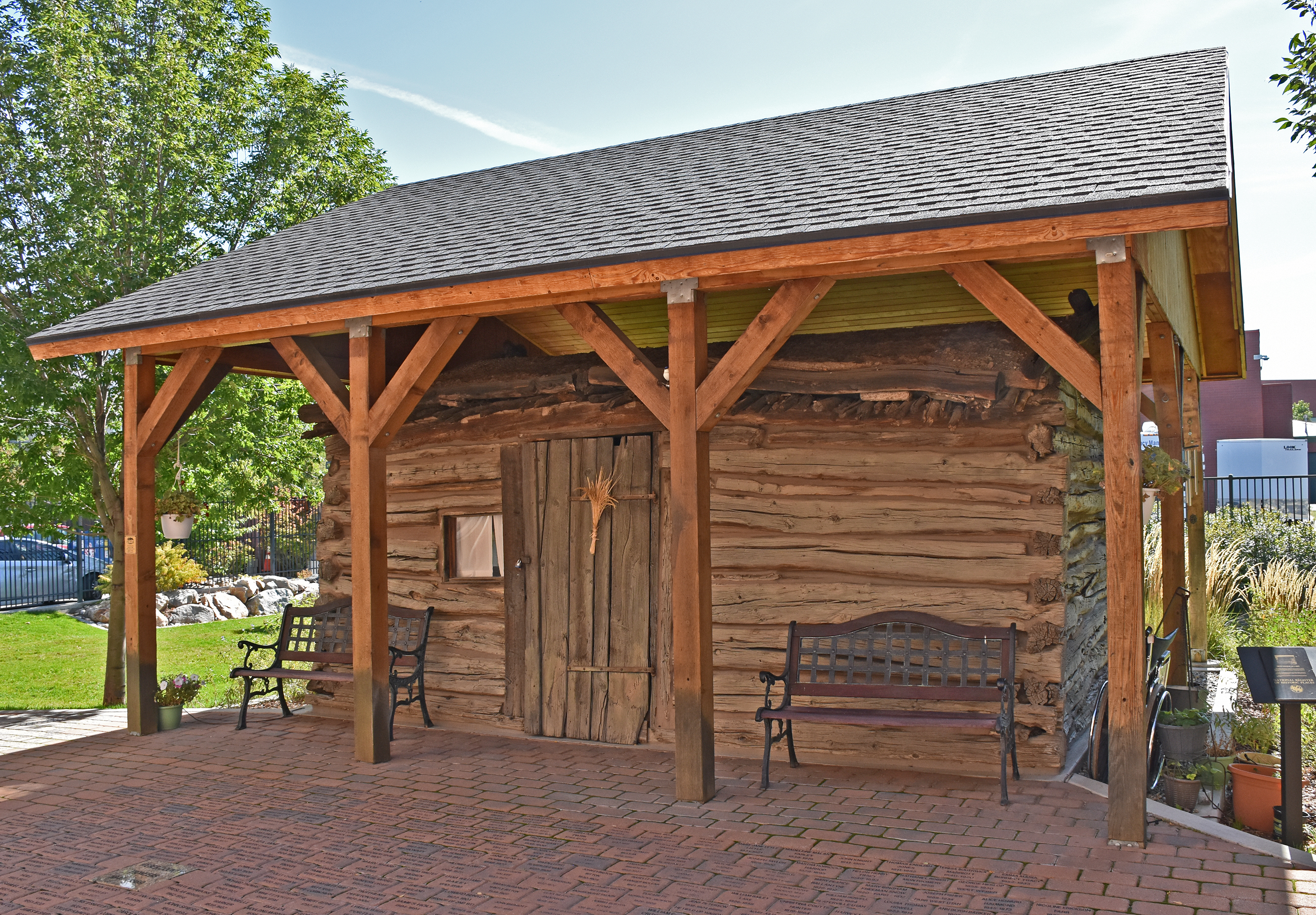
Goodyear Cabin

A cabin built by Goodyear within Fort Buenaventura has been preserved and designated as the "Miles Goodyear Cabin Monument". The structure was moved to a permanent location near the Daughters of the Utah Pioneers Museum on Grant Avenue, Ogden. A plaque on the cabin reads:

This cabin built about 1841 by Miles Goodyear, as far as known, the first permanent house built in Utah, stood near the junction of Ogden and Weber Rivers. In 1847 it was sold to Captain James Brown of the Mormon Battalion with a Spanish land grant covering all of Weber County. It was preserved by Minerva Shaw Stone and by her presented to the Daughters of Utah Pioneers of Weber County who placed it on the present site.

== See also ==
- Mormon Battalion
- Miles Goodyear Cabin

== Sources ==
- Kelly, Charles and Maurice L. Howe, Miles Goodyear (1937);
- Morgan, Dale, "Miles Goodyear and the Founding of Ogden", Utah Historical Quarterly 21 (July 1953);
- Critchloe, William III and Richard W. Sadler, "Miles Goodyear's Fort Buenaventura" (1978).
