= Provo Utah Rock Canyon Temple =

Latter-day Saint temple in Utah, 1972–2024

Provo Utah Temple
- Closed for renovation
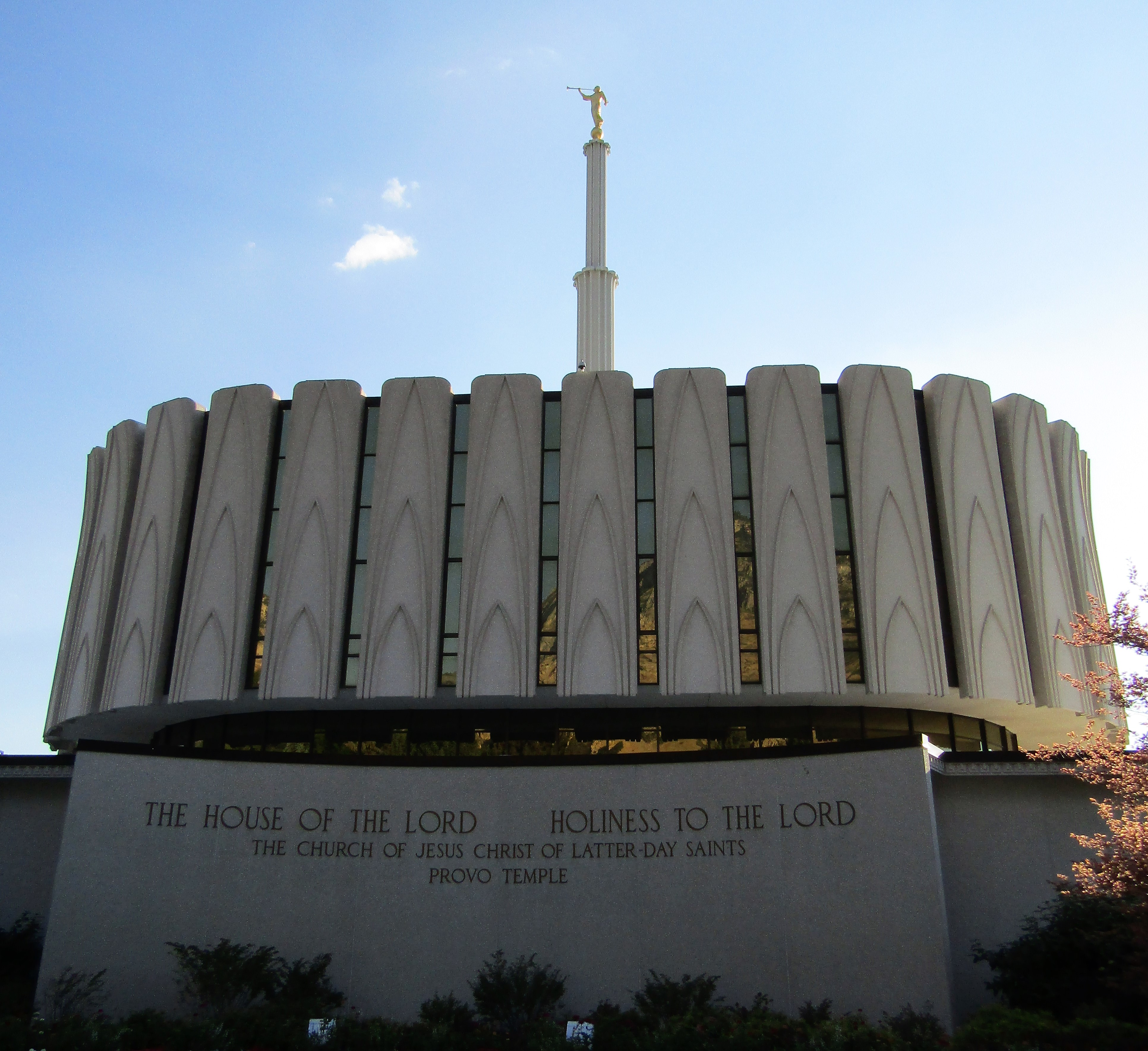
- Interactive map of Provo Utah Temple
- Number: 15
- Dedication: February 9, 1972, by Joseph Fielding Smith
- Site: 17 acres (6.9 ha)
- Floor area: 128,325 ft^{2} (11,921.8 m^{2})
- Height: 175 ft (53 m)
- Official website • News & images

Church chronology
← Ogden Utah Temple	Provo Utah Temple	→ Washington D.C. Temple

Additional information
- Announced: August 14, 1967, by David O. McKay
- Groundbreaking: September 15, 1969, by Hugh B. Brown
- Open house: January 10–29, 1972
- Designed by: Emil B. Fetzer
- Location: Provo, Utah, United States
- Coordinates: 40°15′49.19760″N 111°38′23.20440″W
- Exterior finish: White cast stone with gold anodized aluminum grills, bronze glass panels and a painted spire
- Design: Functional modern with single center spire design
- Baptistries: 1
- Ordinance rooms: 6 (Movie, stationary)
- Sealing rooms: 12
- Clothing rental: Yes
- Notes: Harold B. Lee read the dedicatory prayer prepared by Joseph Fielding Smith

The Provo Utah Rock Canyon Temple (formerly the Provo Utah Temple) is a temple of the Church of Jesus Christ of Latter-day Saints located in Provo, Utah, just north of Brigham Young University (BYU). The intent to build the temple was announced on August 14, 1967, by Hugh B. Brown and N. Eldon Tanner. The temple was designed by architect Emil B. Fetzer and was dedicated in 1972 as the church's seventeenth constructed and fifteenth operating temple. It was the sixth temple built in Utah, and the first in both Utah County and Provo.

A groundbreaking ceremony, to signify the beginning of construction, was held on September 15, 1969, conducted by Brown. The site was also dedicated on the same day by Joseph Fielding Smith. It was built with a modern single-spire design, similar to the original design of the Ogden Utah Temple. The original spire sat on top of a rounded base constructed on a rectangular foundation.

In 2021, the church announced plans to reconstruct the Provo Rock Canyon temple after dedication of the nearby Orem Utah Temple. The temple closed for reconstruction in February 2024. In the same month, the church announced that following reconstruction the temple will be known as the Provo Utah Rock Canyon Temple.

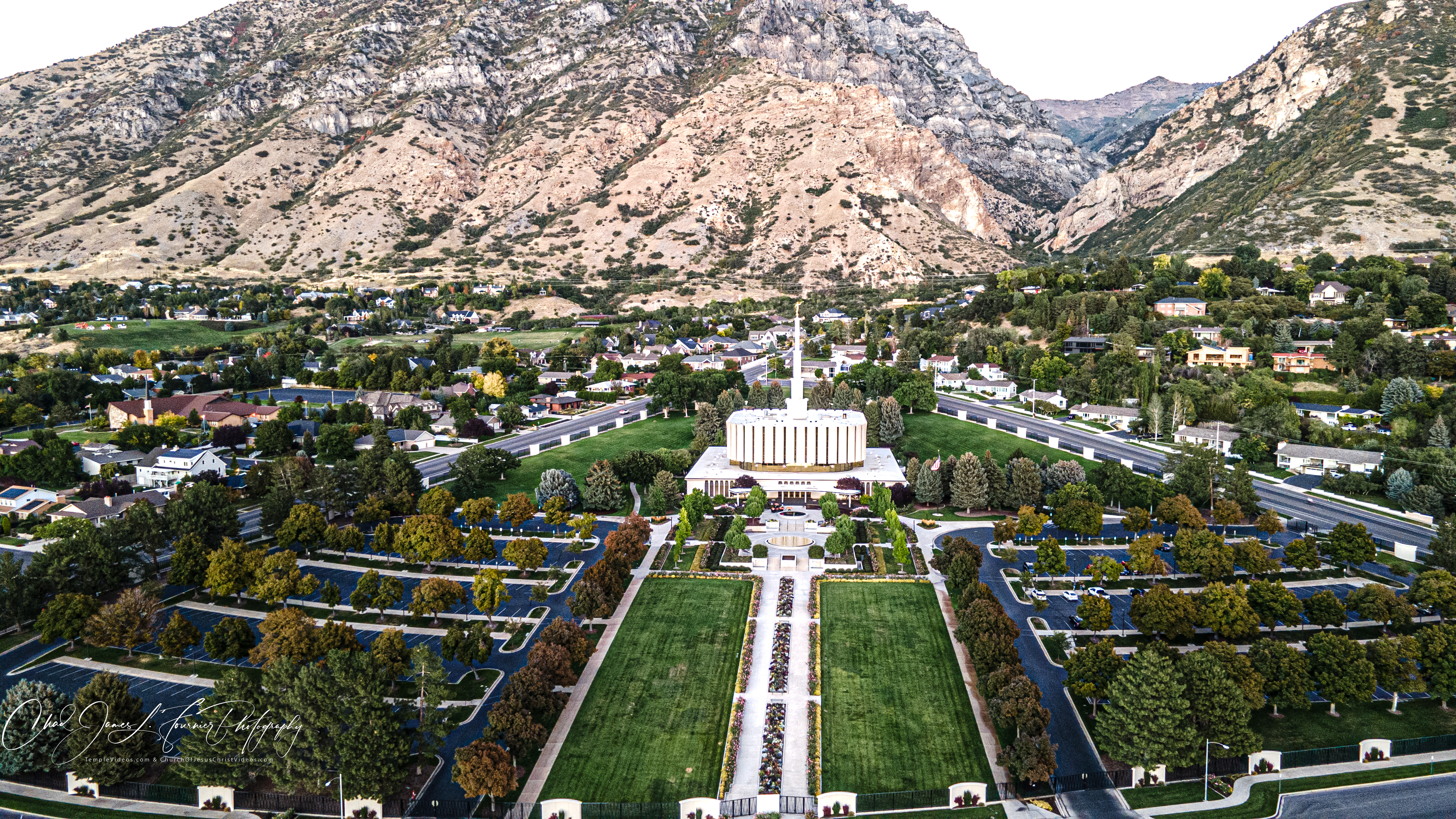
Provo Utah Temple

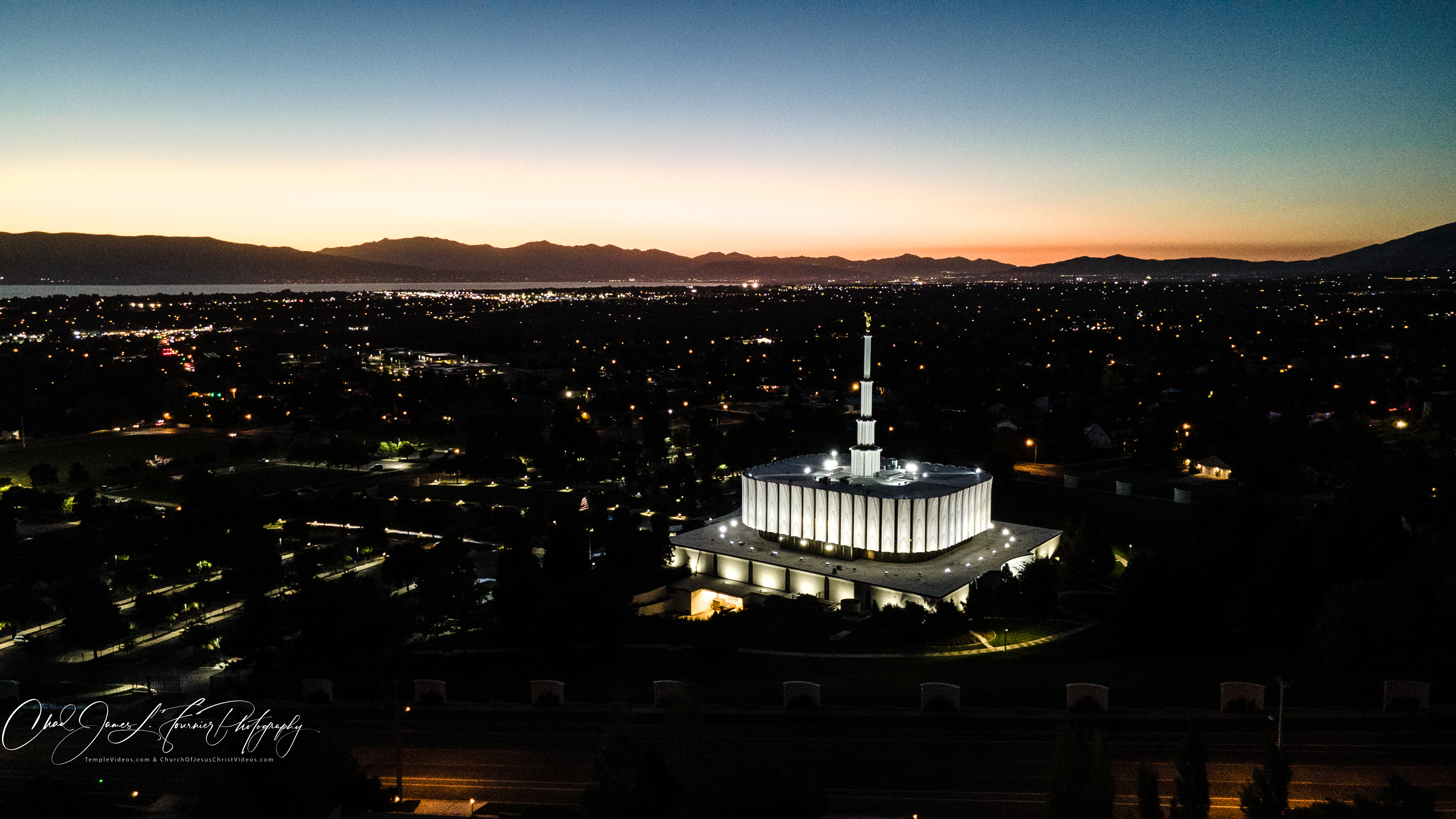
Provo Utah Temple

== History ==
Since Provo's early years, a hill just northeast of downtown Provo was known as "Temple Hill". Instead of a temple, however, the Maeser Building was built on the hill in 1911 as a part of the BYU campus. A 17-acre (69,000 m^{2}) block of property at the base of Rock Canyon was chosen as the site for the Provo Temple. The preliminary plans called for a four-story structure of 130,825 square feet.

The temple was announced by the counselors in the First Presidency, Hugh B. Brown and N. Eldon Tanner, during a meeting with 28 local stake presidencies, on August 14, 1967. A groundbreaking ceremony, to signify the beginning of construction, was held on September 15, 1969. The temple was dedicated on February 9, 1972, by church president Joseph Fielding Smith. The two dedicatory services were broadcast to several large auditoriums on the BYU campus, including the 22,700-seat Marriott Center.

== Design and architecture ==
Emil B. Fetzer, the architect for the Ogden and Provo temples, was asked to create a functional design with efficiency, convenience, and reasonable cost as key factors.

The temple sits on a 17-acre site, with its surrounding landscaping featuring gardens, fountains, and walkways. These elements are designed to provide a tranquil setting that enhances the sacred atmosphere of the site.

Views about the architectural design from the temple have been seen as representing the "pillar of cloud" by day, and the "pillar of fire" by night, guiding the children of Israel.

The structure stands four stories tall, constructed with precast concrete, gold anodized aluminum grills, and bronze glass panels. The exterior is characterized by its rounded shape, single spire, and Gothic-like arch designs, each chosen for their symbolic significance and alignment with temple traditions.

The interior features murals, crystal and glass chandeliers, and gold detailing, found throughout the temple, designed to create a spiritually uplifting environment. The temple had 6 instruction rooms, used for the endowment, and 12 sealing rooms, all surrounded by a circular hallway, and has a total floor area of 128,325 square feet (11,921.8 m^{2}). The general contractor for the temple was Hogan and Tingey.

Symbolic elements are integrated into the design, providing deeper meaning to the temple's function and aesthetics. Incorporated into the design are symbolic elements representing the Bible and Book of Mormon which provide deeper spiritual meaning to the temple's appearance and function. Symbolism is important to church members. These symbols include the central spire and baptismal font. To members of the church, the central spire represents reaching upwards to heaven. In this temple, the central spire was originally painted gold to symbolize the pillar of fire by night set upon a large white building that represented the pillar of cloud by day, referring to the Israelites in their exodus from Egypt spoken of in Exodus 13:21-22. In the temple, baptismal fonts rest on the back of 12 oxen, symbolizing the twelve tribes of Israel.

== Renovations ==
Over the years, the Provo Utah Temple has undergone several renovations to preserve its structural integrity, update facilities, and enhance its spiritual and aesthetic appeal. The most significant prior renovation project began in 2003.

The original designs for the temple featured a golden spire with an angel Moroni covered in gold leaf atop the spire. This statue was later removed from the plan. Thirty-one years after the temple's completion, a statue of the angel Moroni was added to the spire, which itself was changed from gold to white. With the current renovations that commenced in February 2024, the designs do not include an angel Moroni statue.

In the October 2021 general conference, church president Russell M. Nelson announced the temple would be reconstructed following the dedication of the Orem Utah Temple (which was dedicated in January 2024). The new design will not reflect the modernist plans of the original building, despite some opposition from community members. The new designs are similar to other contemporary temples, including the Orem Utah and Deseret Peak Utah temples.

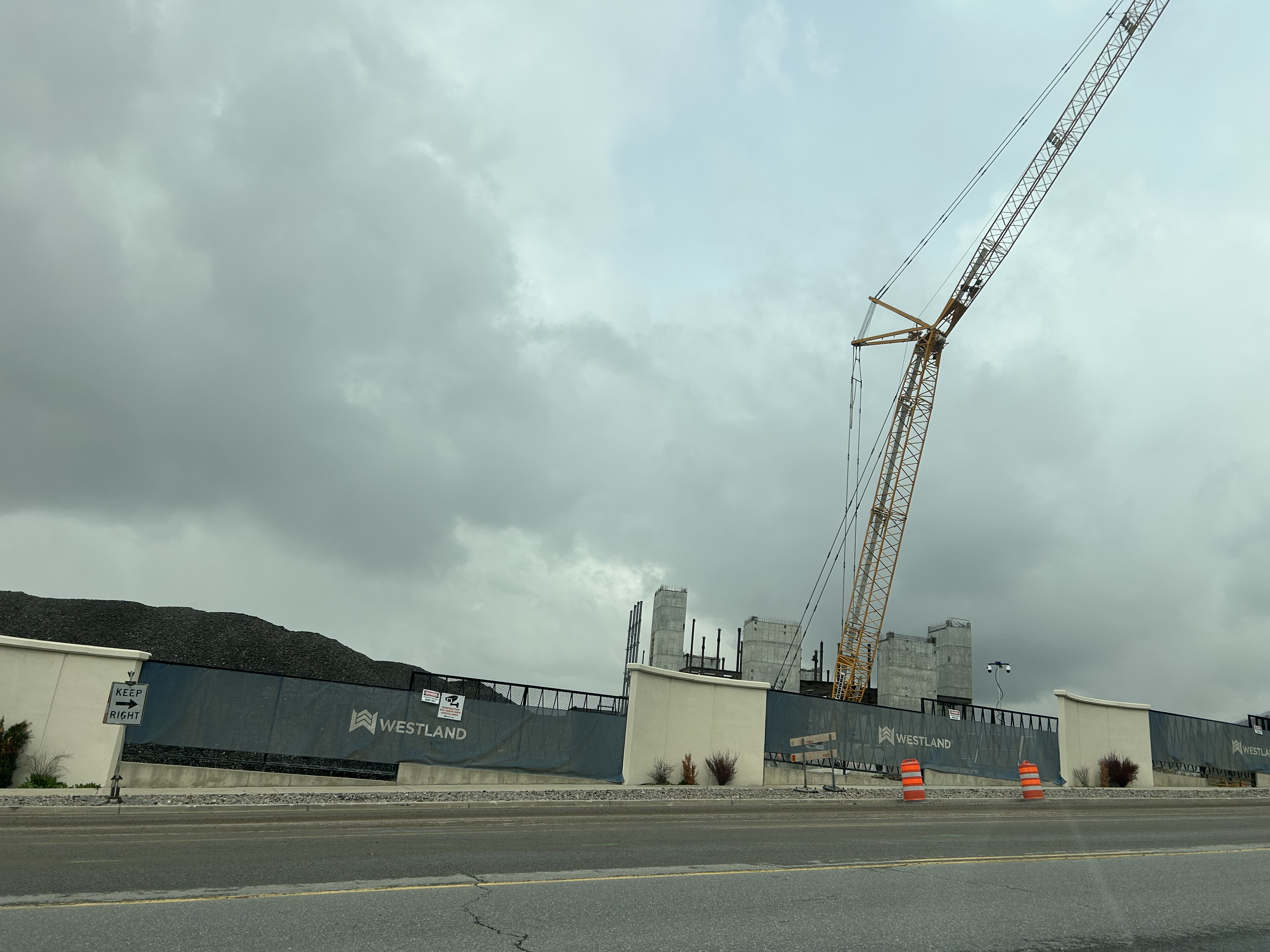
The Provo Utah Rock Canyon Temple in April 2025 during its reconstruction

In February 2024, the church announced that following reconstruction, the temple would be renamed the Provo Utah Rock Canyon Temple.

== Cultural and community impact ==
Throughout the 1960s, enrollment at BYU in Provo expanded and church membership grew. The Logan, Manti, and Salt Lake temples were overcrowded, with about 52% of all temple ordinances being performed in those three temples. Construction in Ogden and Provo was completed to ease the impact on the other temples. The Ogden and Provo temples were built at the same time with similar designs to increase efficiency and economize the building process.

In the spring of 1983, major flooding in the region threatened the temple. On May 29, 1983, with help from volunteers, the city turned Temple View Drive into a temporary river.

In 2020, like all the church's others, the Provo Utah Rock Canyon Temple was closed for a time in response to the COVID-19 pandemic. It reopened on May 11, 2020, for limited use and completely reopened on June 14, 2021.

A temple-to-temple run is held annually on Pioneer Day between the Provo Utah Rock Canyon and Provo City Center temples.

== Purpose ==
A temple is where church members go to make sacred promises, or covenants, and perform ordinances for themselves or on behalf of their deceased ancestors. These ordinances include baptism and confirmation, washing and anointing, endowment, and sealing. While the grounds are open to everyone, only church members who hold a current temple recommend enter the temple to participate in the ordinances.

In large part because of its location across the street from a Missionary Training Center and proximity to BYU, the Provo Utah Temple was one of the church's busiest. In 2016, the Provo City Center Temple was dedicated, making Provo the second city in the world, following South Jordan, Utah, to have two active temples. The two temples (Provo City Center Temple and Provo Utah Temple) are 2.4 miles apart.

As of 2022, the temple served stakes from the cities of Provo, Orem, Vineyard, Midway and Heber City.

== Temple presidents ==
A temple president is responsible for the administration of temple operations and spiritual guidance for both temple patrons and staff. Since its dedication in 1972, the temple has been overseen by a series of temple presidents, each serving for a term of three years. However, the first president of the Provo Utah Temple (Herold G. Clark) served for 4 years from 1972 to 1976.

Notable presidents of this temple include:

- A. Theodore Tuttle (1980–82)
- J. Elliot Cameron (1989–92)
- Dean L. Larsen (1998–2001)
- Merrill J. Bateman (2007–10)
- Robert H. Daines III (2010–13)
- Alan Ashton (2013–2016)

As of 2022, James W. Barry is the current temple president.

== See also ==
Temples in Utah
Wasatch Front Temples
Temples along the Wasatch Front
- = Operating
- = Under construction
- = Announced
- = Temporarily Closed

- The Church of Jesus Christ of Latter-day Saints in Utah
- Comparison of temples of The Church of Jesus Christ of Latter-day Saints
- List of temples of The Church of Jesus Christ of Latter-day Saints
- List of temples of The Church of Jesus Christ of Latter-day Saints by geographic region
- Temple architecture (Latter-day Saints)
