= Fort Buenaventura =

Historic site in Utah, United States

Coordinates: 41.214802°N 111.989943°W

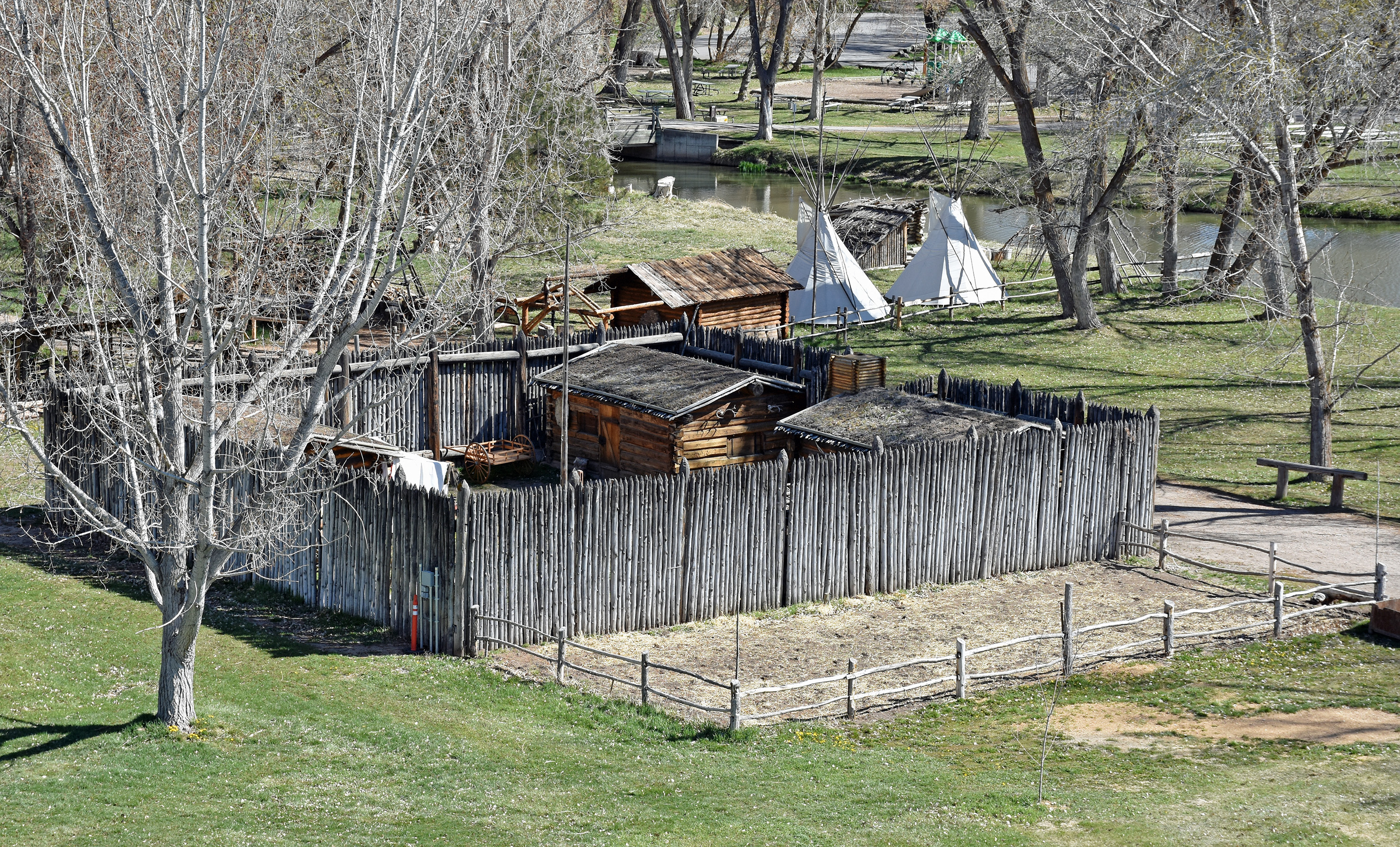
Fort Buenaventura replica

Fort Buenaventura, located in west Ogden, Utah, United States, was the first permanent Anglo settlement in the Great Basin. Built just east of the Weber River in 1846 by Miles Goodyear, the fort and its surrounding lands were purchased by Mormon settlers in 1847 and renamed Brownsville (then later Ogden). Following flooding along the river in 1850, the fort was abandoned.

In 1980, Fort Buenaventura State Park was opened, which included a replica of the fort at its original location. In 2002, ownership of the park was transferred to Weber County, which now operates the fort and surrounding recreational facilities.

== History ==
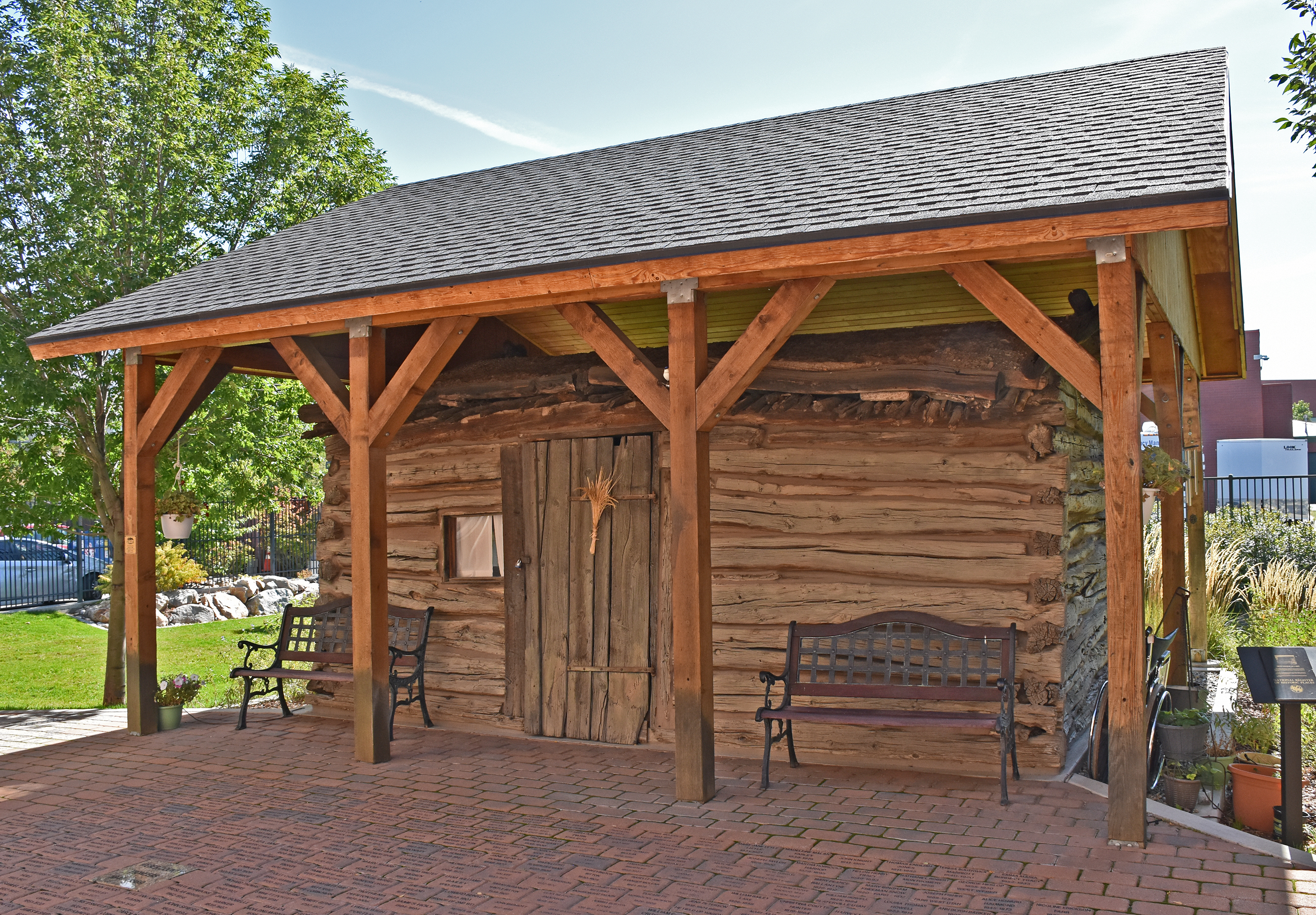
The Miles Goodyear Cabin, the only extant part of the original fort

Fort Buenaventura was the first permanent settlement by people of European descent in the Great Basin. It was established by the trapper Miles Goodyear and his business partner Captain Wells in 1846.

The fort was built near a bend on the east bank of the Weber River, and served as a trading post for trappers and travelers. The settlement's location is about a mile west-southwest from the present-day Ogden municipal building.

In November 1847, Fort Buenaventura and the surrounding land claim were purchased by recently arrived Mormon settlers for $1,950 (equivalent to about $67,379 in 2025). The settlement was then renamed Brownsville but was later changed to Ogden after Peter Skene Ogden, who trapped beaver in the Weber Valley. The fort was abandoned following flooding in 1850, and settlers constructed a new fort (Brown's Fort) a short distance to the south and east. At least one cabin was saved from the original fort; this structure is preserved at the Weber County Daughters of Utah Pioneers museum as the "Miles Goodyear Cabin."

== Weber County park ==
The site of the original Fort Buenaventura is now a park occupying 84 acres (340,000 m^{2}). The park, which includes a replica of the original fort, was dedicated as a Utah State Park in October 1980.

Prior to the replica's construction, during fall 1979, Dr. Evan DeBloois, a regional archaeologist with the U.S. Forest Service and adjunct professor at nearby Weber State University, completed an archaeological excavation. The excavation uncovered parts of the old stockade, revealing the fort's original dimensions.

The replica was constructed using techniques from the original fort's construction, including mortise and tenon joints, and was made as accurate as possible based on existing evidence. One major exception being its construction out of quaking aspen and lodgepole pine, rather than cottonwood like the original. Following a damaging windstorm, portions of the fort had to be reconstructed in 2000. This reconstruction was made using higher quality materials.

Following budget cuts, the state turned over ownership of the property to Weber County in 2002 (and ended its status as a "state park"). Located at 2450 "A" Avenue in Ogden, the county-run park offers camping, canoeing and meeting facilities during the summer season.

== See also ==
- Fort Robidoux, another early trading post in present-day Utah
