= William Fyfe =

William Fyfe may refer to:

- William Fyfe (boatbuilder) (1785–1865), Scottish founder of the Fife & Sons shipyard, grandfather of William Fife#Biography
- William Baxter Collier Fyfe (1836–1882), Scottish painter
- William Hamilton Fyfe (1878–1965), British–Canadian scholar
- William Fyfe (geochemist) (1927–2013), New Zealand geologist
- William Patrick Fyfe (born 1955), Canadian serial killer

== See also ==
- William Fyffe (disambiguation)
- William Fife (disambiguation)
