= Jordan River Utah Temple =

Latter-day Saint temple in South Jordan, Utah, United States

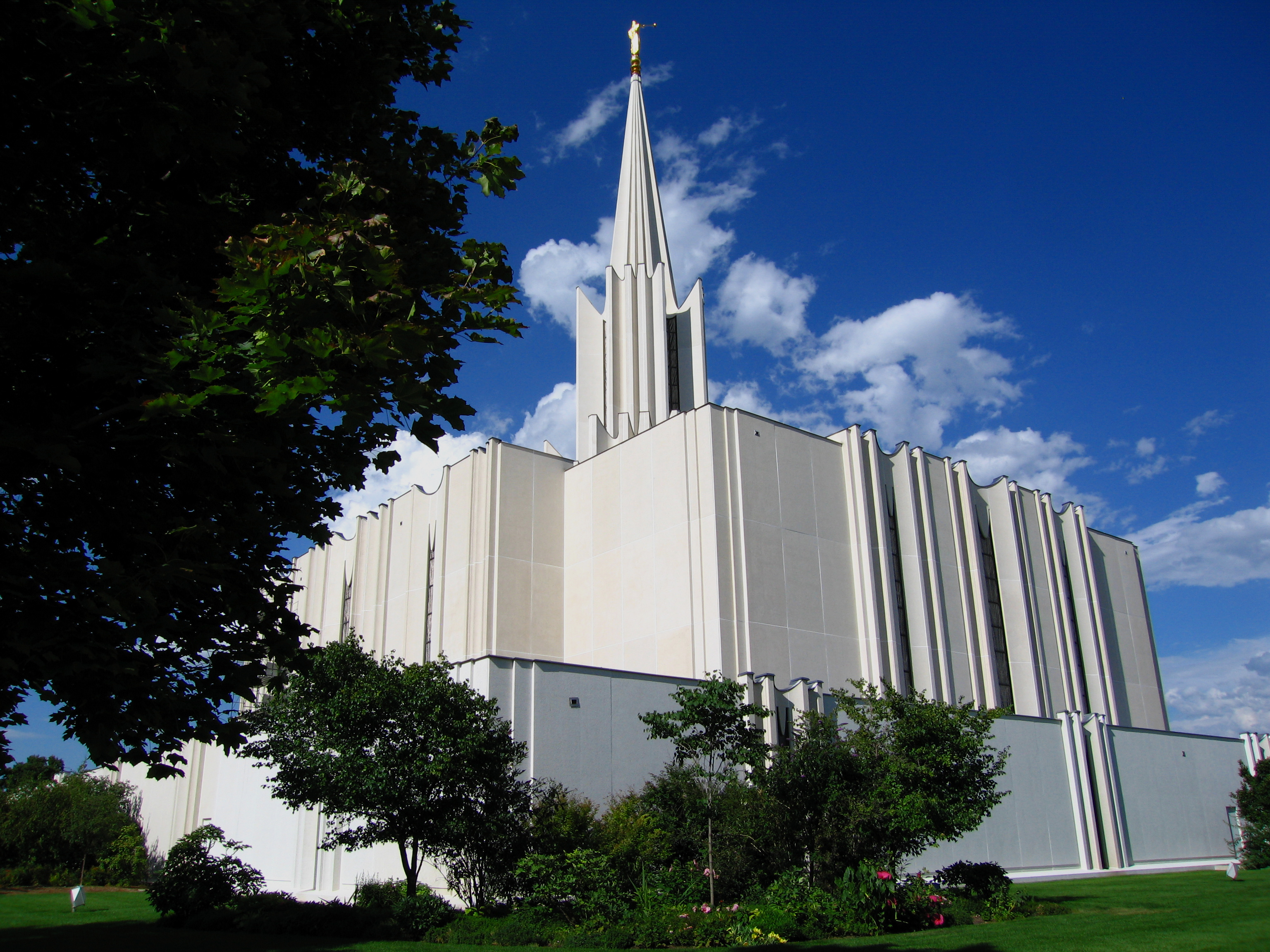
- Interactive map of Jordan River Utah Temple
- Number: 20
- Dedication: November 16, 1981, by Marion G. Romney
- Site: 15 acres (6.1 ha)
- Floor area: 148,236 ft^{2} (13,771.6 m^{2})
- Height: 219 ft (67 m)
- Official website • News & images

Church chronology
← Seattle Washington Temple	Jordan River Utah Temple	→ Atlanta Georgia Temple

Additional information
- Announced: February 3, 1978, by Spencer W. Kimball
- Groundbreaking: June 9, 1979, by Spencer W. Kimball
- Open house: September 29 – October 31, 1981 (original); March 17 – April 28, 2018 (after renovations)
- Rededicated: May 20, 2018, by Henry B. Eyring
- Designed by: Emil B. Fetzer
- Location: South Jordan, Utah, United States
- Coordinates: 40°33′58.08600″N 111°55′53.51520″W
- Exterior finish: Cast stone with white marble chips, tower is cemlite
- Baptistries: 1
- Ordinance rooms: 6 (Movie, stationary)
- Sealing rooms: 16
- Clothing rental: Yes

The Jordan River Utah Temple (formerly the Jordan River Temple) is the 20th operating temple of the Church of Jesus Christ of Latter-day Saints, located in South Jordan, Utah. The intent to build the temple was announced on February 3, 1978, by church president Spencer W. Kimball during a press conference in the Church Office Building. The temple is the first in the city of South Jordan, the second in Salt Lake County, and as of 2024 is one of thirty in the state of Utah.

The temple has a single spire design and is one of the only temples with an angel Moroni holding the gold plates. The temple was designed by Emil B. Fetzer, using a modern architectural design. A groundbreaking ceremony to signify the beginning of construction was conducted by Kimball on June 9, 1979.

== History ==
The temple was announced by church president Spencer W. Kimball on February 3, 1978. The site for the temple was selected due to its significance to the church and the local community. In 1880, William Holt, a 19-year-old English immigrant, bought 15 acres of land from his uncle Jesse Vincent for $2.00 an acre. This land remained in the Holt family until Alma Holt and his family donated the parcel of land to the church.

Unlike many of the temples, which are built mostly with tithing funds, the site was given to the church and all of its construction was paid for by members in the 134 stakes within the temple district. At the time, payment from local building funds was the established church practice but was later abandoned to respond to the need for temples and meetinghouses in developing areas of the world.

A site dedication and groundbreaking ceremony was held on June 9, 1979. The ceremony and dedication were presided over by Kimball. Instead of the usual small ceremonial shovel-full of dirt at the groundbreaking, Kimball used a large power scoop shovel to begin the building process.

Following completion of construction, the temple was open to the public for tours from September 29 through October 31, 1981. Over half a million people toured the temple during its open house. The temple was dedicated on November 16, 1981 by Marion G. Romney, a counselor in the First Presidency.

== Design and architecture ==
The building has modern aspects blended with traditional temple designs. Designed by Emil B. Fetzer, the temple's architecture reflects both the cultural heritage of South Jordan and its spiritual significance to the church.

The temple is on a 15 acre (61. ha) plot, with landscaping that includes fountains, conifer and deciduous trees, and other flowers and plants in the gardens.

The temple is four stories tall and is made of cast stone with white marble chips. To reduce the weight, some of the towers contain fiberglass and cemlite. The exterior has drape-motif-inspired windows, a single spire, and stained glass windows. The design uses elements that reflect both the local culture and broader church symbolism.

It is the church's fourth largest temple (second-largest in Utah) and has a total of 148,236 square feet (13,771.6 m^{2}). It has a baptistry, six ordinance rooms (used for the endowment ceremony), and sixteen sealing rooms (used for marriage ordinances). The interior has stained glass, dark wood accents, and crystal chandeliers.

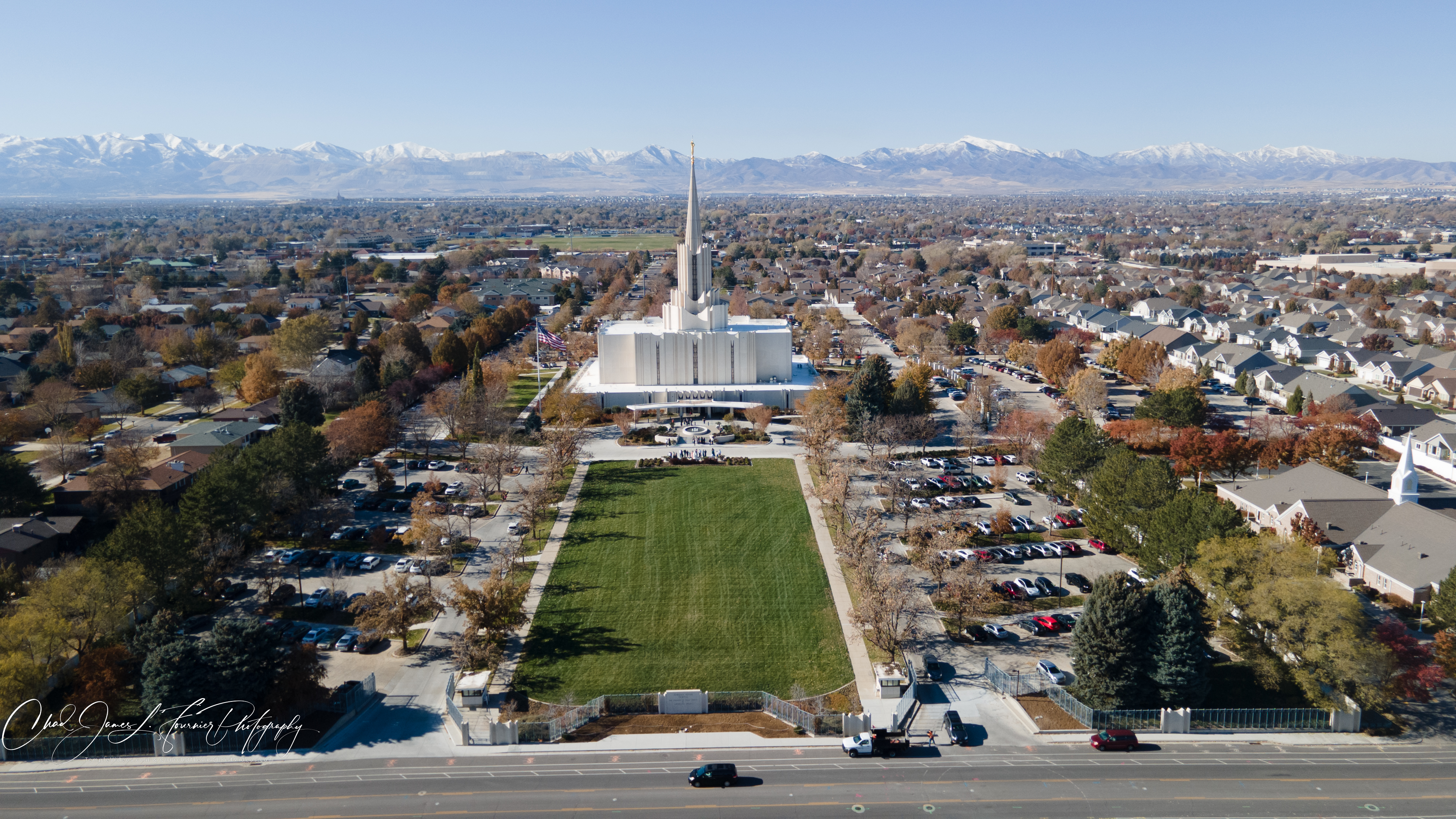
Jordan River Utah Temple

== Dedication ==
Marion G. Romney, of the church's First Presidency, dedicated the temple in fifteen sessions held during November 16–20, 1981. More than 160,000 members attended the dedicatory services. Thirty of those in attendance at the dedication were elderly members who had been at the dedication of the first temple in the Salt Lake Valley, the Salt Lake Temple. Most had been very young at the time but still remembered the event. The temple serves Latter-day Saints in Southern Salt Lake County, Utah. Geographically, it is the smallest Latter-day Saint temple district in the world, but the temple is one of the church's busiest.

== Symbols ==
The design has symbolic elements from the Bible and Book of Mormon, providing deeper spiritual meaning to the temple's appearance and function. Symbolism is important to church members and for them, the central spire represents reaching upwards to heaven. With his right hand, Moroni holds a horn to his lips, symbolizing the spreading of the gospel throughout the world and the Second Coming of Jesus Christ, which will be announced by trumpet-blowing angels. In the temple, the baptismal fonts rest on the back of 12 oxen, symbolizing the twelve tribes of Israel.

== Renovations ==
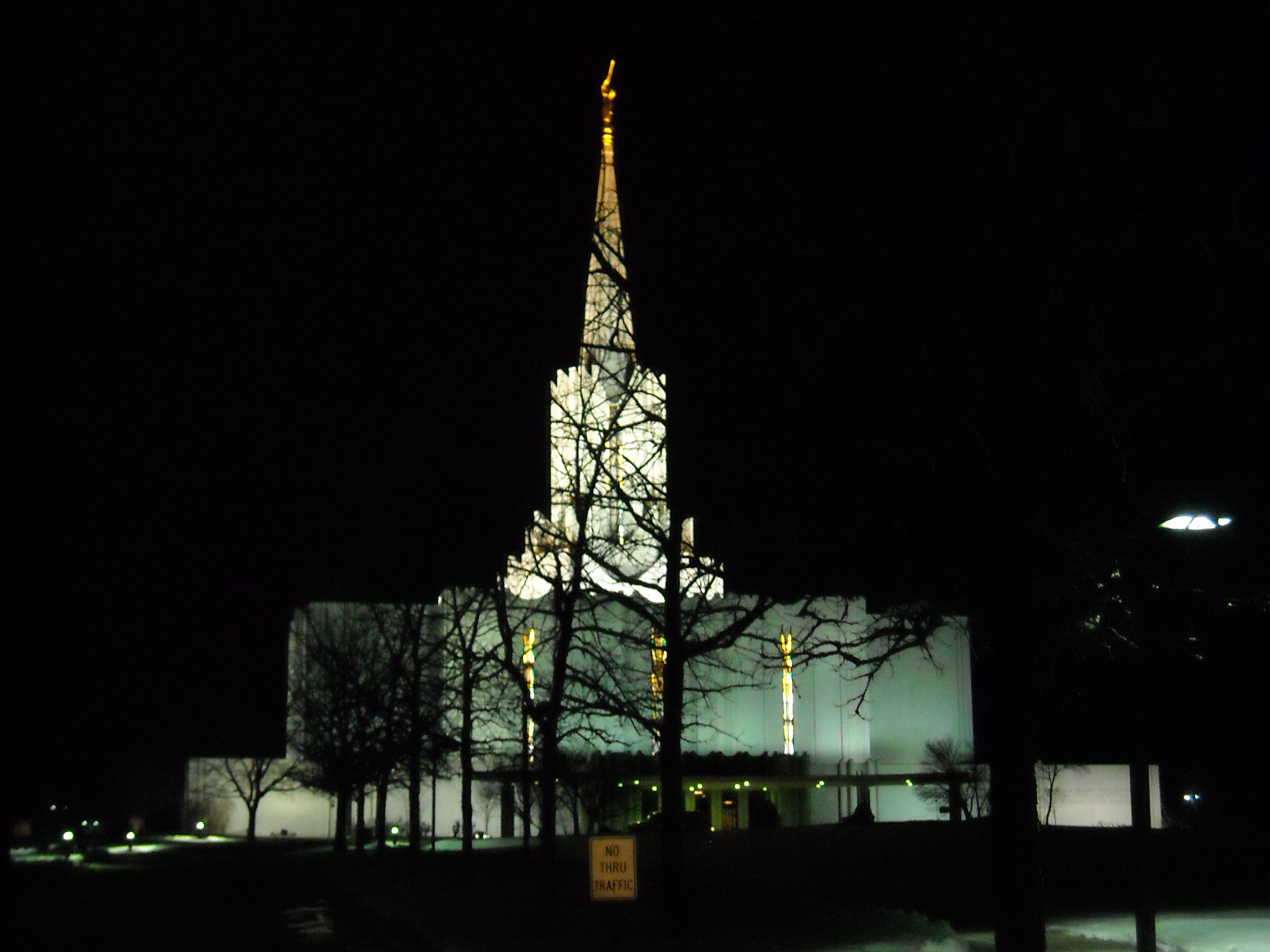
Jordan River Temple at night.

On August 7, 2015, the church announced that beginning February 15, 2016, the temple would close for renovations that were anticipated to be completed during the latter part of 2017.

The renovations focused on several key areas such as interior systems like heating, ventilation, air conditioning, and electrical systems. The general floor plan remained the same. Interior walls were removed to remodel the celestial room, the bride’s room, initiatory areas, and the baptistry, including the addition of a separate baptistry entrance. Other renovations included a bride and groom exit at the west side of the temple instead of the front to greet friends and family. Escalators were replaced with staircases. These changes were made to ensure the temple's compliance with contemporary building standards.

Throughout the renovation process, care was taken to maintain the temple's historical and spiritual significance. Artisans and specialized craftsmen ensured the artwork was cohesive with the interior designs and were in keeping with the original design.

Following renovations, a public open house was held from March 17 through April 28, 2018, excluding Sundays and two Saturdays associated with the church's general conference. The temple was rededicated by Henry B. Eyring on May 20, 2018.

== Temple presidents ==
The church's temples are directed by a temple president and matron, each typically serving for a term of three years. The president and matron oversee the administration of temple operations and provide guidance and training for both temple patrons and staff.

Notable presidents include H. Burke Peterson (1985–87); William Grant Bangerter (1990–93); LeGrand R. Curtis (1996–99); Ben B. Banks (2002–05); and Robert L. Backman (2005–08). Serving from 1981 to 1985, Donovan H. Van Dam was the president. As of 2022, James Scott Lundberg was serving as president.

== Admittance ==
Like all the church's temples, it is not used for Sunday worship services. To members of the church, temples are regarded as sacred houses of the Lord. Once dedicated, only church members with a current temple recommend can enter for worship.

== See also ==
Temples in Utah
Wasatch Front Temples
Temples along the Wasatch Front
- = Operating
- = Under construction
- = Announced
- = Temporarily Closed

- The Church of Jesus Christ of Latter-day Saints in Utah
- Comparison of temples of The Church of Jesus Christ of Latter-day Saints
- List of temples of The Church of Jesus Christ of Latter-day Saints
- List of temples of The Church of Jesus Christ of Latter-day Saints by geographic region
- Temple architecture (Latter-day Saints)
