= William C. Fyffe =

William C. Fyffe (Bill Fyffe) was an American broadcast news reporter and news director who made significant contributions to the development of the modern news format including the Eyewitness News format and use of live remotes in newscasts. He was station manager at WLS-TV and general manager at WABC-TV and WLUK-TV. He was news director for KABC-TV in Los Angeles, KLTLA, WLS-TV, and WXYZ-TV. He was the Vice President for News for the ABC Owned Stations and wrote the ABC Stylebook for News. He was also the President of Fyffe Callaway & Associates, a broadcast consulting firm. Fyffe is recipient of the Peabody Award for Journalism the National Headliners Club Award for reporting, and multiple Emmy Awards. The Fyffe Award is a prize given to an outstanding broadcast journalism student at Northwestern University. Fyffe developed his happy-talk format in the Midwest, particularly as news director at WLS-TV in Chicago. For ABC-affiliated stations, the formula became the network's "Eyewitness News." Fyffe died on October 12, 2000 in Bloomington, Indiana from a brain injury suffered in a fall. He was 71 years old.
