= William W. Fife =

American architect

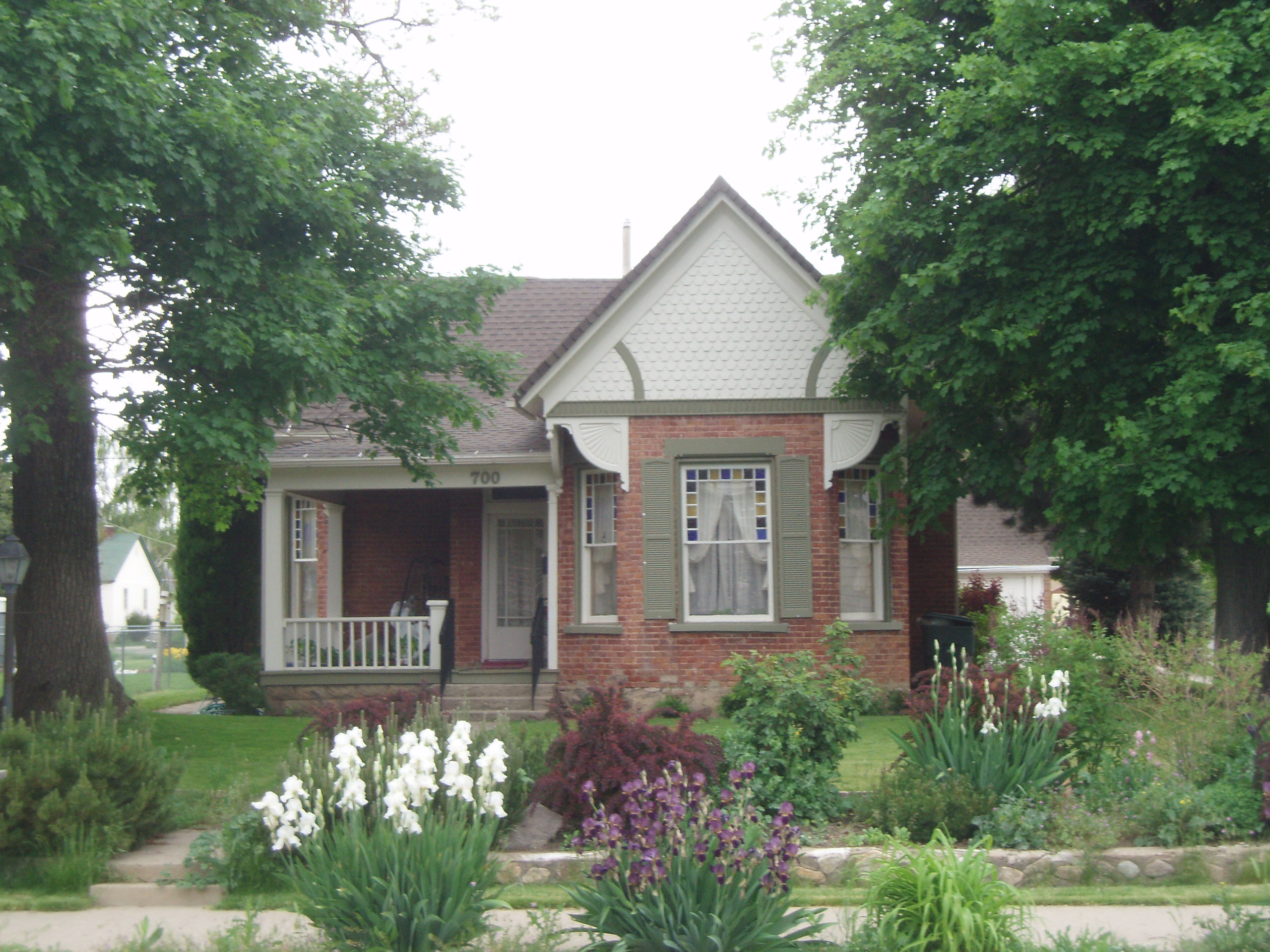
Valasco Farr House designed by William W. Fife at 700 Canyon Road in Ogden

William Wilson Fife (August 16, 1857 – August 31, 1897) was a 19th-century architect of Richardsonian Romanesque in Ogden, Utah. His works include the Second Empire Ogden City Hall, Scowcroft Block, Perry's Block, the Utah Territorial Reform School, the Woodmansee-Union Block, Utah Loan & Trust Building, and Ogden High School. Some of Fife's works have been added to the National Register of Historic Places, including the Valasco Farr House and a residence at 2523 Jefferson Ave that is part of the Jefferson Avenue Historic District.

== See also ==
- William N. Fife, his father
