= William N. Fife =

American architect

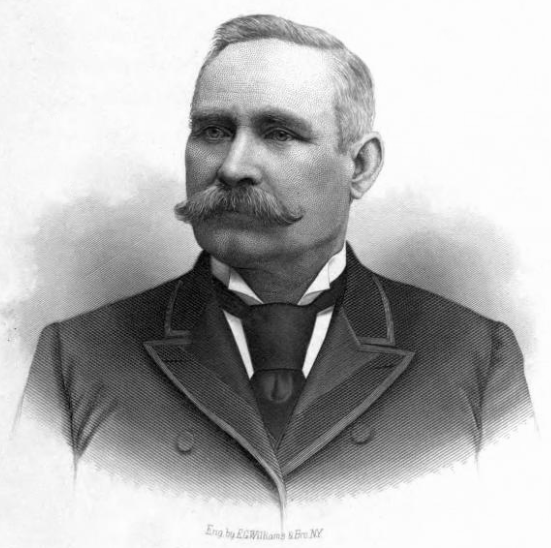
- Born: William Nicol Fife; October 16, 1831; Perthshire, Scotland
- Died: October 21, 1914 (aged 83); Salt Lake City, Utah, U.S.
- Burial place: Ogden City Cemetery
- Occupation: Architect
- Children: William W. Fife

Signature
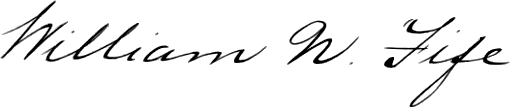

William Nicol Fife (October 16, 1831 – October 21, 1914) was a Scottish-trained architect in early Utah. His works included the original Ogden Pioneer Tabernacle, Ogden Central School, and the Weber Courthouse, none of which are standing today.

The great-grandson of a notable Edinburgh architect, William Wilson, Fife was born in Kincardine, Perthshire, Scotland. He became a member of the Church of Jesus Christ of Latter-day Saints while working as an architect in Manchester, England. Immigrating to the U.S. through New Orleans, he sailed up the Mississippi River to St. Louis, and then traveled by wagon train to Utah. He became a leader in the Mormon community of Utah, and served as an emissary from Mormon President Heber C. Kimball to General Albert Sidney Johnston, and was appointed U.S. marshal for Ogden in 1861, later serving as a frontier guide, a Colonel in the U.S. Army and an early pioneer in southeastern Arizona. He was still U.S. marshal and present in 1869 when the Golden Spike was driven, completing the first transcontinental railroad at nearby Promontory Point, Utah. He was the father of William W. Fife, another Utah architect.

== Biography ==
William N. Fife was born in Kincardine, Perthshire, Scotland on October 16, 1831.

He died at his daughter's home in Salt Lake City on October 21, 1914, and was buried at Ogden City Cemetery.
