= Weber Stake Relief Society Building =

- U.S. National Register of Historic Places
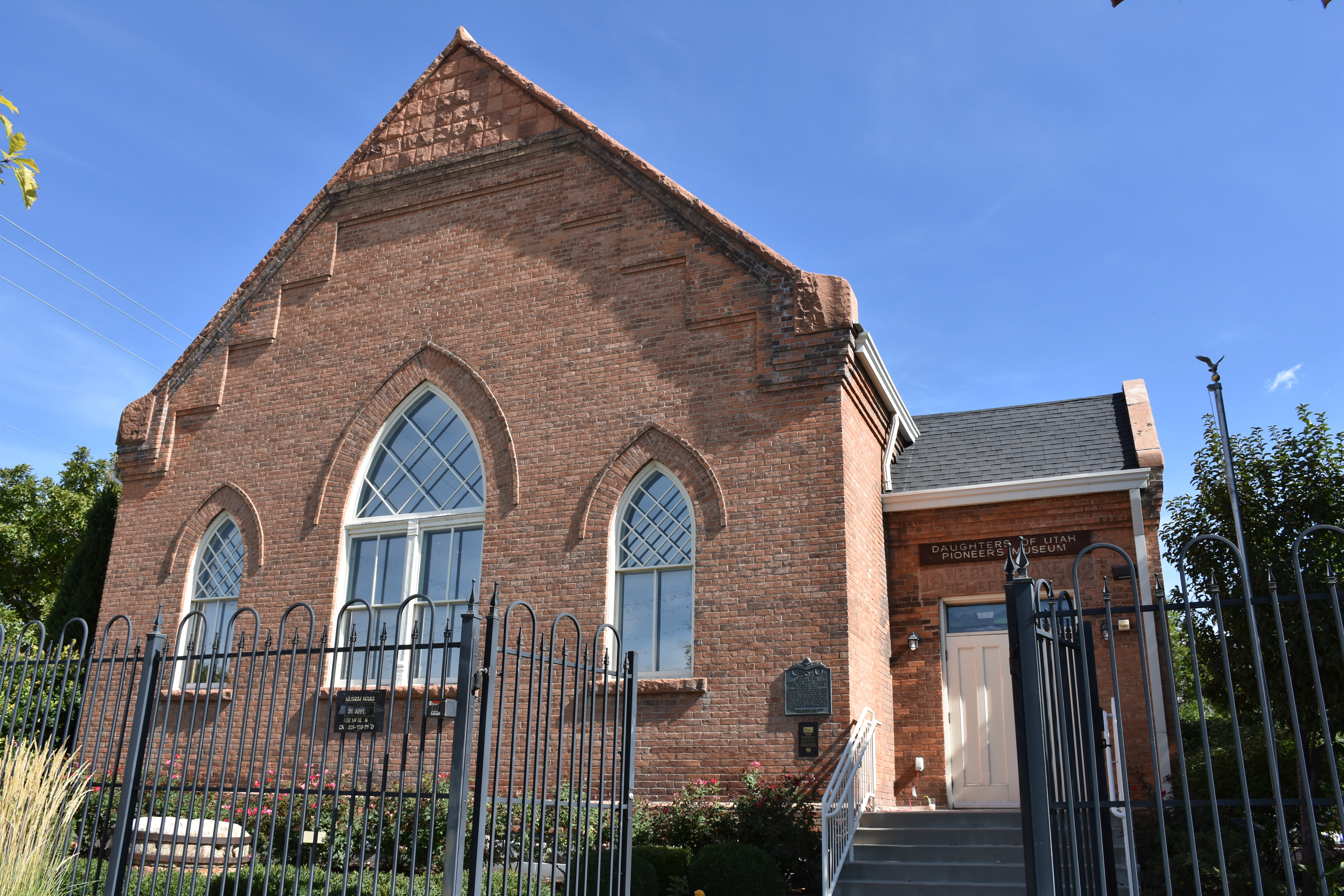
- The building in 2022

- Location within Utah Location within the United States
- Location: 2104 Lincoln Avenue, Ogden, Utah
- Coordinates: 41°13′44.1″N 111°58′31.85″W
- Area: 0.5 acres (0.20 ha)
- Built: 1902
- Architectural style: Gothic Revival
- MPS: Mormon Church Buildings in Utah MPS
- NRHP reference No.: 88003438
- Added to NRHP: February 13, 1989

The Weber Stake Relief Society Building is a historic building in Ogden, Utah. It was built in 1902 for the Relief Society in the Weber stake of the Church of Jesus Christ of Latter-day Saints (LDS Church), and it was designed in the Gothic Revival architectural style. It has been listed on the National Register of Historic Places since February 13, 1989.

In 1926, the building was deeded to the Weber County chapter of the Daughters of Utah Pioneers (DUP) for use as a meeting place and relic hall. Over the course of the next few years, the DUP prepared the building and surrounding grounds for their use, including moving the historic Miles Goodyear Cabin next to the hall. The museum was then officially opened by the DUP, and dedicated by Apostle David O. McKay, on February 22, 1929.

In 1972, the LDS Church opened the Ogden Utah Temple on the same city block (historically known as Tabernacle Square) as the Relief Society building. When the temple we rebuilt in the 2010s, it was decided to move the Relief Society building and all other DUP property, such as the Goodyear cabin, to another lot in Ogden. The structure was moved from its original location in January 2012, and the museum reopened in May 2013.
