= Robert H. Daines =

American politician

Robert H. Daines (April 14, 1905–August 2,1985) was a leading plant pathologist.

== Personal life ==
Daines was born in Preston, Idaho. He was member of the Church of Jesus Christ of Latter-day Saints and served as a missionary for the church. He married Anna M. Daines who eventually became a teacher and community leader in Metuchen, New Jersey, where she served as a member of the YMCA board.

Daines received his bachelor's degree from Utah State University and his master's degree and Ph.D. from Rutgers University. After getting his Ph.D. in 1934 he joined the Rutgers University faculty.

In the LDS Church he served as president of the New Jersey Stake, and beginning in 1967 as the first president of the New Jersey Central Stake.

Daines served three terms as a member of the Metuchen School Board. During his initial run for the office some opposition was based on his religion.

== Career ==
Daines was involved in the development of Captan and Phaltan, fungicides used to protect apple crops. He also was involved in developing Mertect. He was later involved in work to protect peach crops. He was a leader in observing the detrimental effects of industrial pollutants on plants. He served as secretary of the New Jersey Air Pollution Commission that adopted the first state air pollution control law. Daines made advances in the control of diseases in sweet potato crops. He wrote multiple books on home storage and plant disease.

After leaving Rutgers at age 70, Daines moved to Utah where he actively did research as an emeritus professor at Brigham Young University.

Among the Daines' children was Robert H. Daines III, was a prominent professor of business.

== Sources ==
- Bio of Daines
