= Robert H. Daines III =

American Mormon leader and academic (1934–2021)

Robert H. Daines III (May 30, 1934 – November 2, 2021) was an American leader in the Church of Jesus Christ of Latter-day Saints (LDS Church) and academic who was the Driggs Professor of Strategic Management at Brigham Young University (BYU).

== Life and career ==
Daines was born in Logan, Utah on May 30, 1934, the son of Robert H. Daines and his wife, Anna Stoddard Merrill. He was raised in Metuchen, New Jersey; his father was a professor at Rutgers University.

Daines held an Master of Business Administration from Stanford University and a Doctorate of Business Administration from Indiana University School of Business. He was on the BYU faculty for over 40 years and head of the school's MBA program from 1966 to 1978.

Daines was a member of the Church of Jesus Christ of Latter-day Saints (LDS Church). In the church he served as a bishop, stake president, president of the Pennsylvania Harrisburg Mission (1979–1982), and from 2010 to 2013 as president of the Provo Utah Temple.

Daines was the co-author of the textbook Strategic Financial Management (1988, McGraw-Hill, ISBN 9780256057812).

Daines married the former Janet Lundgren. Janet was born and raised in Oregon, mainly in LaGrande, Oregon. They were married in the Logan Utah Temple. Among their children is Michelle D. Craig, who became a counselor in the LDS Church's Young Women General Presidency in 2018.

Daines died in Provo, Utah on November 2, 2021, at the age of 87.

== Sources ==
- Forbes biography of Daines
- BYU speeches bio of Daines
