= Architecture of the LDS Church =

The architecture of the Church of Jesus Christ of Latter-day Saints (LDS Church) includes the design and use of its temples, meetinghouses, historic sites, and other facilities. The LDS Church uses unique architecture, some of which has even been called imposing. Its architecture differs based on the uses of individual buildings and varies in style throughout the world.

== Temples ==
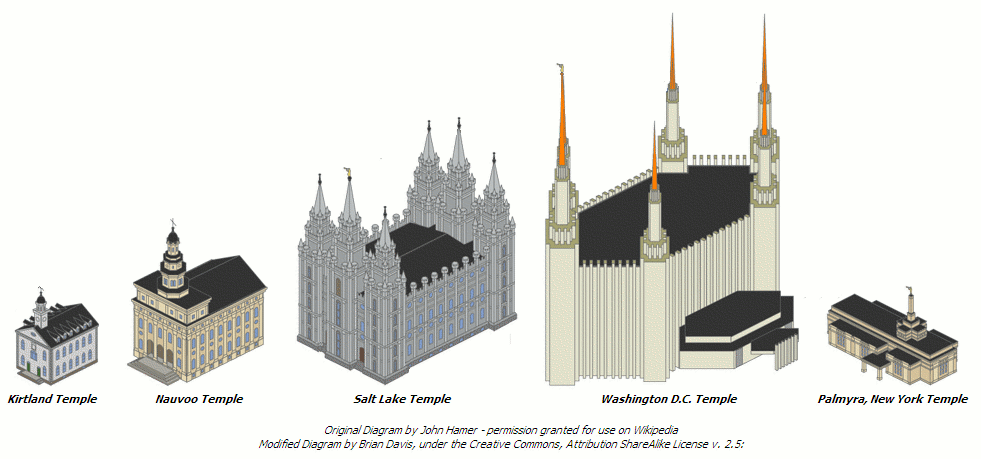
Comparison of several LDS Temples

The LDS Church's temples are its most ornate and unique buildings. Church members believe temples are "the most sacred place of worship on earth" and a literal "house of the Lord." Temples have been built since 1836, when the Kirtland Temple was built under the direction of church president Joseph Smith, who said he had received a revelation stating that church members restore the practice of temple worship. Latter-day Saints view temples as the fulfillment of a prophecy found in Malachi 3:1 (KJV).

Temples are used exclusively for special ordinances of the church, which members believe are necessary for exaltation. Because of this importance, temples are much more elaborate and unique than the church's standard meetinghouses, which are used for weekly worship services and social activities.

=== Early temples ===
The first two temples, Kirtland (1833) and Nauvoo (1846), were built before the introduction of the endowment ceremony and baptism for the dead. As such, these temples were not originally designed for worship, but for education. They were used by the School of the Prophets as well as for church leadership meetings and large gatherings. These two temples were built in the Federal, Greek Revival, and Gothic Revival architectural styles.

The next era of temples, often referred to as the "castellated temples", include the first four temples constructed in Utah, built between 1847 and 1893. These temples resemble castles and are built in the castellated Gothic style of architecture with some having influence from the Gothic Revival, Neo-Renaissance, Second Empire and Colonial Revival styles.

The Salt Lake Temple, the first of these temples to be started but last to be finished, is made with a sandstone foundation. The walls are quartz monzonite (which has the appearance of granite) from Little Cottonwood Canyon, located twenty miles southeast of the temple. It is the largest temple in the church, which also includes a large underground area. The temple's walls are nine feet thick at the base and six feet thick at the top. It was also the first temple to include an angel Moroni statue, which was created by sculptor Cyrus Edwin Dallin, and was later added to many other temples.

Early Temples

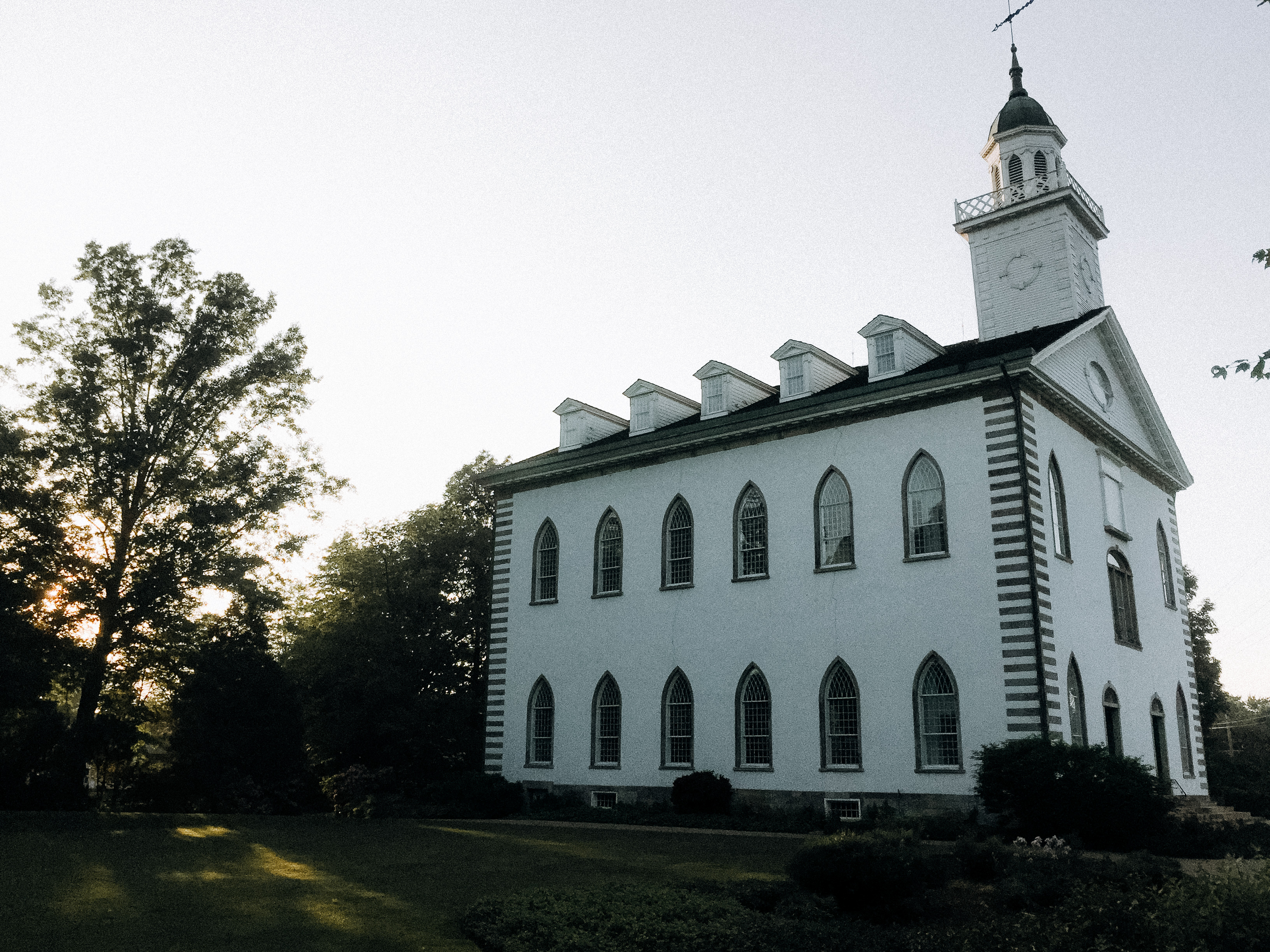
Kirtland Temple exterior

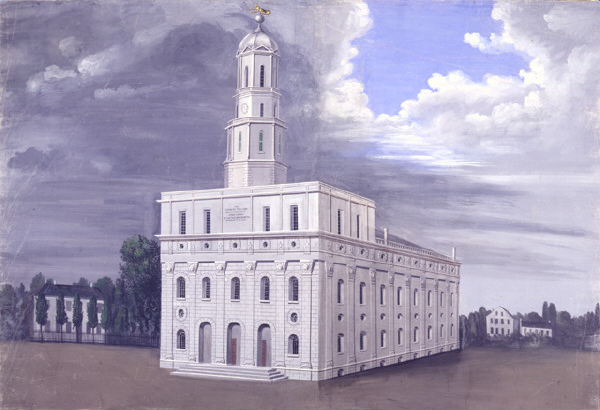
Nauvoo Temple

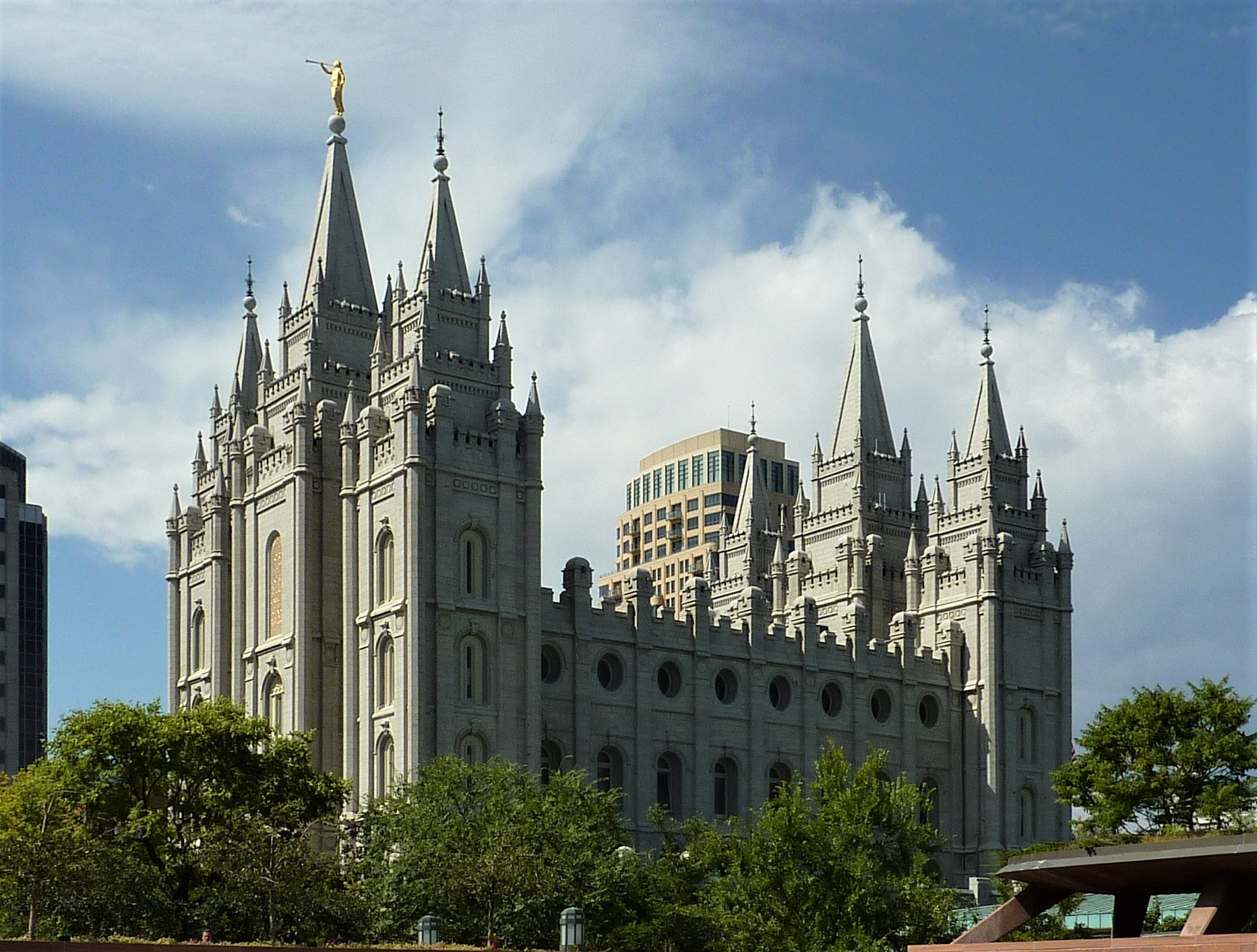
Salt Lake Temple

=== No spire temples ===
The Laie Hawaii, Cardston Alberta, and Mesa Arizona temples were built with no spire and are intended to resemble Solomon's Temple from the Bible. They do not have an angel Moroni statue. Three other structures, the Meridian Idaho, Paris France, and Lima Peru Los Olivos temples (built in the 2010s and 2020s), also do not have a spire, but are not meant to replicate Solomon's Temple.

The temple in Cardston was the first design to be put out to bid to prominent architects and the first built outside the United States.

The Laie Hawaii Temple is decorated with carved friezes. Each side depicts four dispensations of time: the Old Testament (west), New Testament (south), Book of Mormon (north), and that of the Latter-days (east).

No Spire Temples

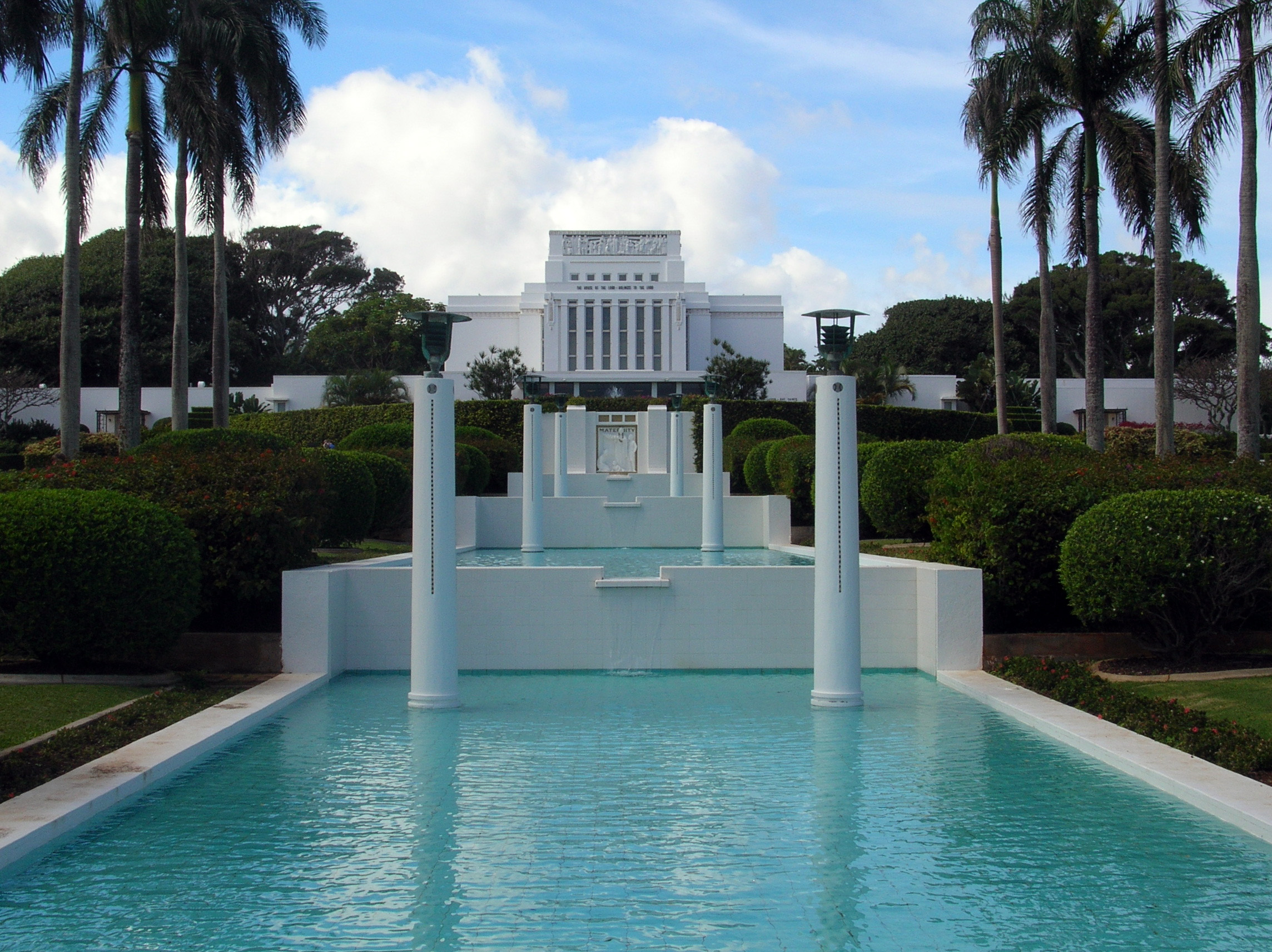
Laie Hawaii Temple

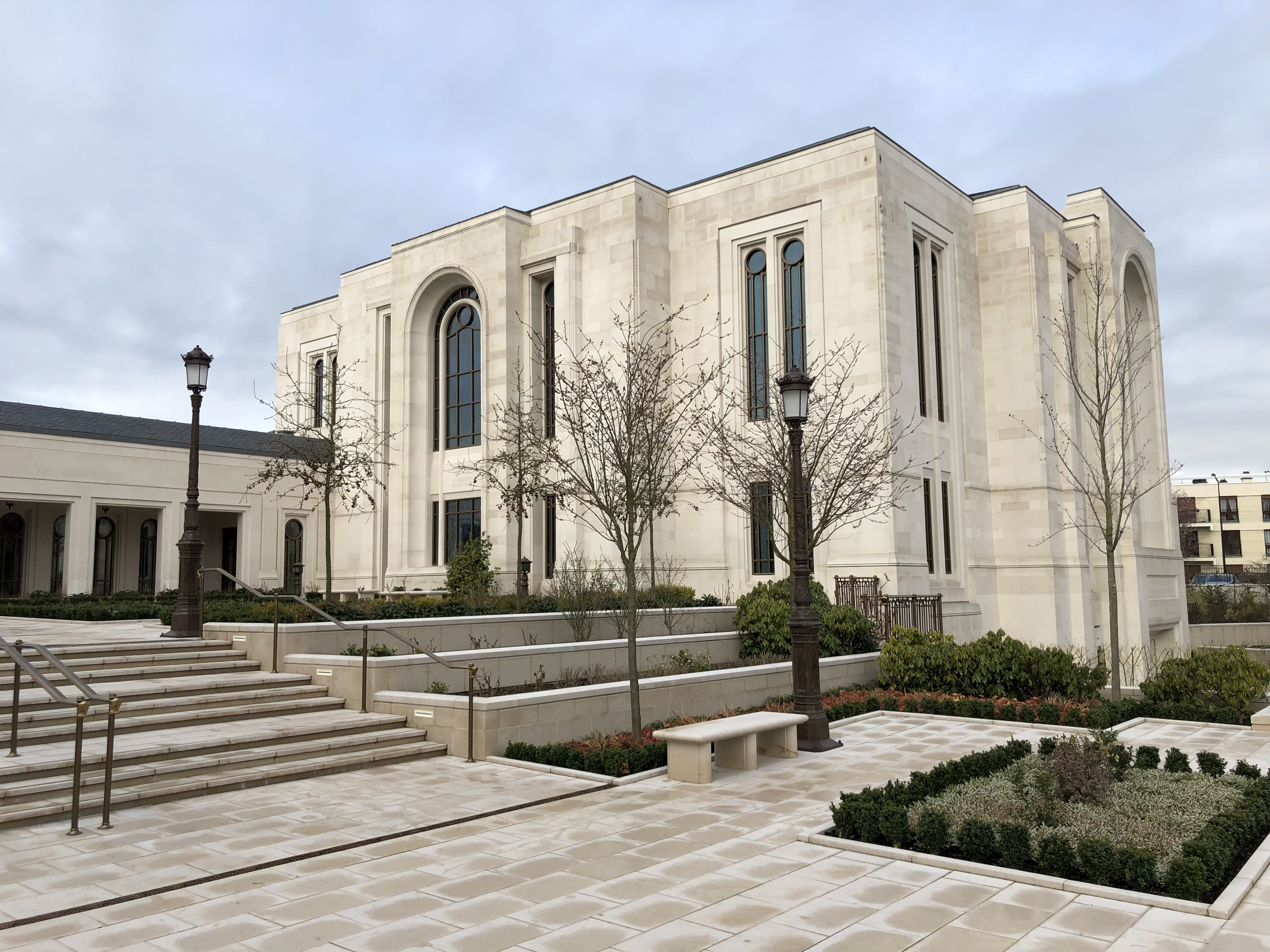
Paris France Temple

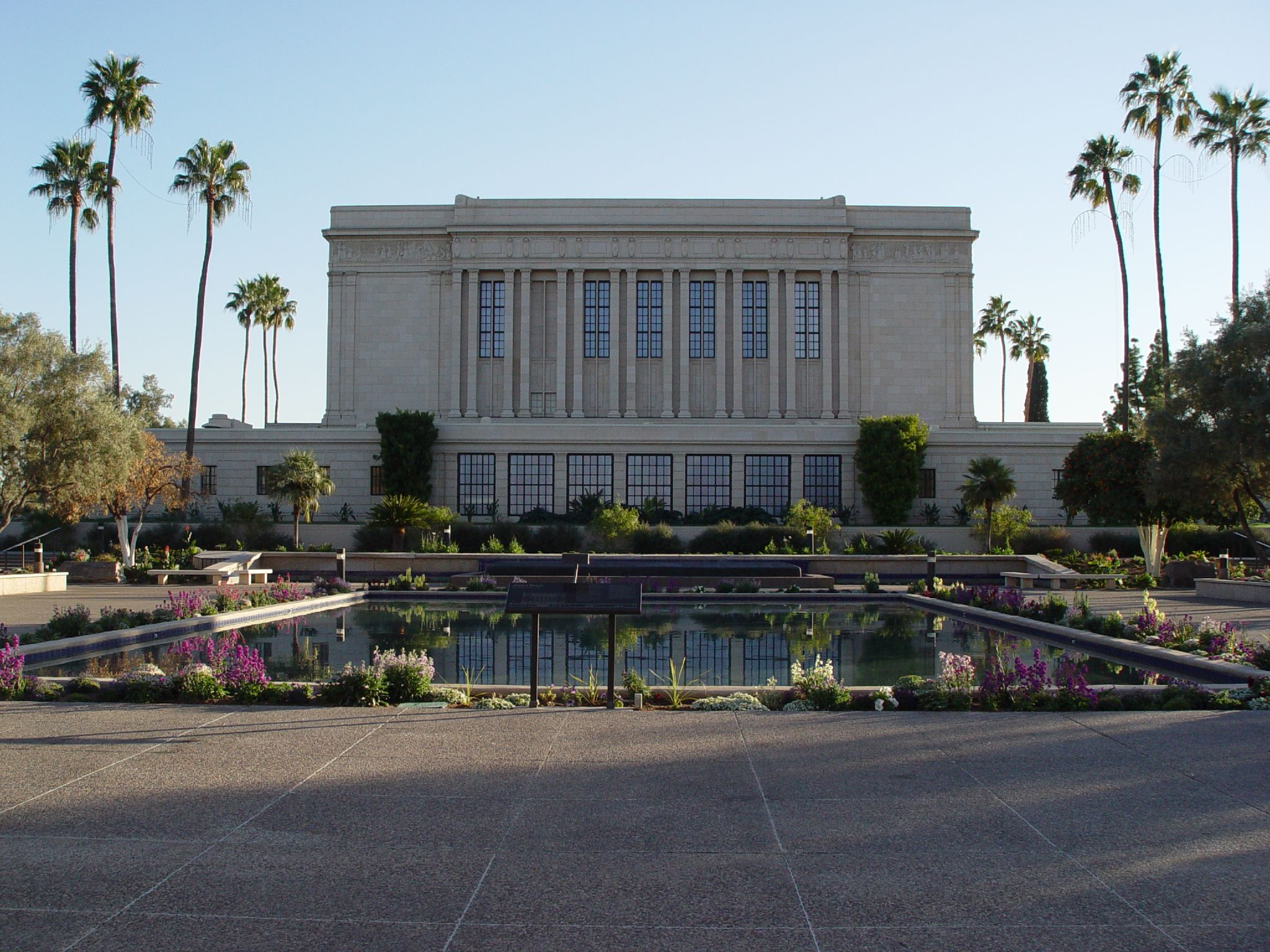
Mesa Arizona Temple

=== Center and single spire temples ===
Many later temples were built with a center-spire design. The Idaho Falls Idaho Temple was the first in years to be constructed with any sort of spire or tower. The Oakland California Temple is an unusual variation on the center spire design as it also has four additional spires—one on each corner of the building—for a total of five. The center spire is the tallest and it is the only temple with five spires.

The Bern Switzerland Temple, the first in Europe, was the first built with a non-center single-spire design. This was intended to resemble older temples, like Kirtland and Nauvoo, but with a more contemporary design.

Center & Single Spire Temples

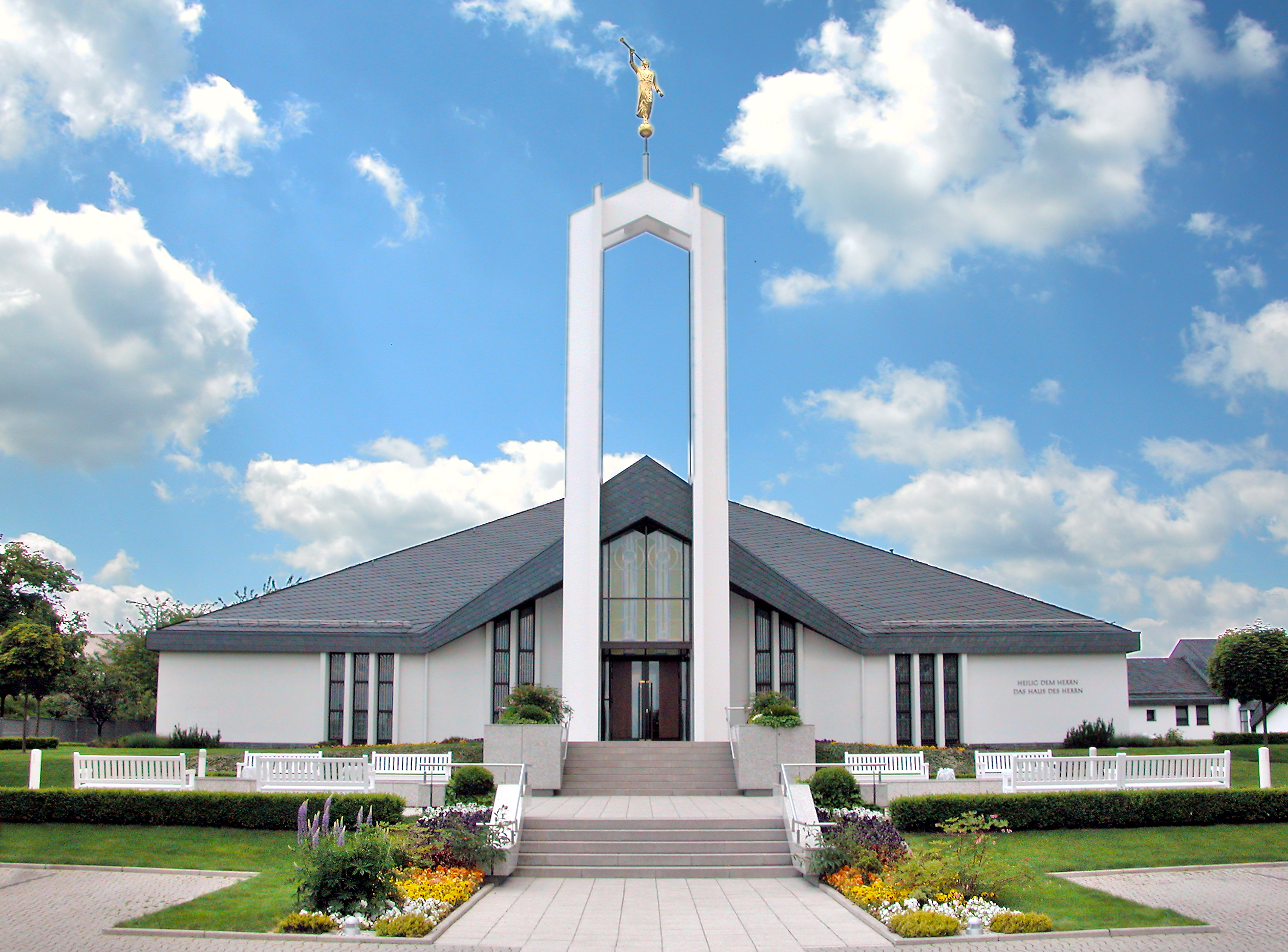
Freiberg Germany Temple

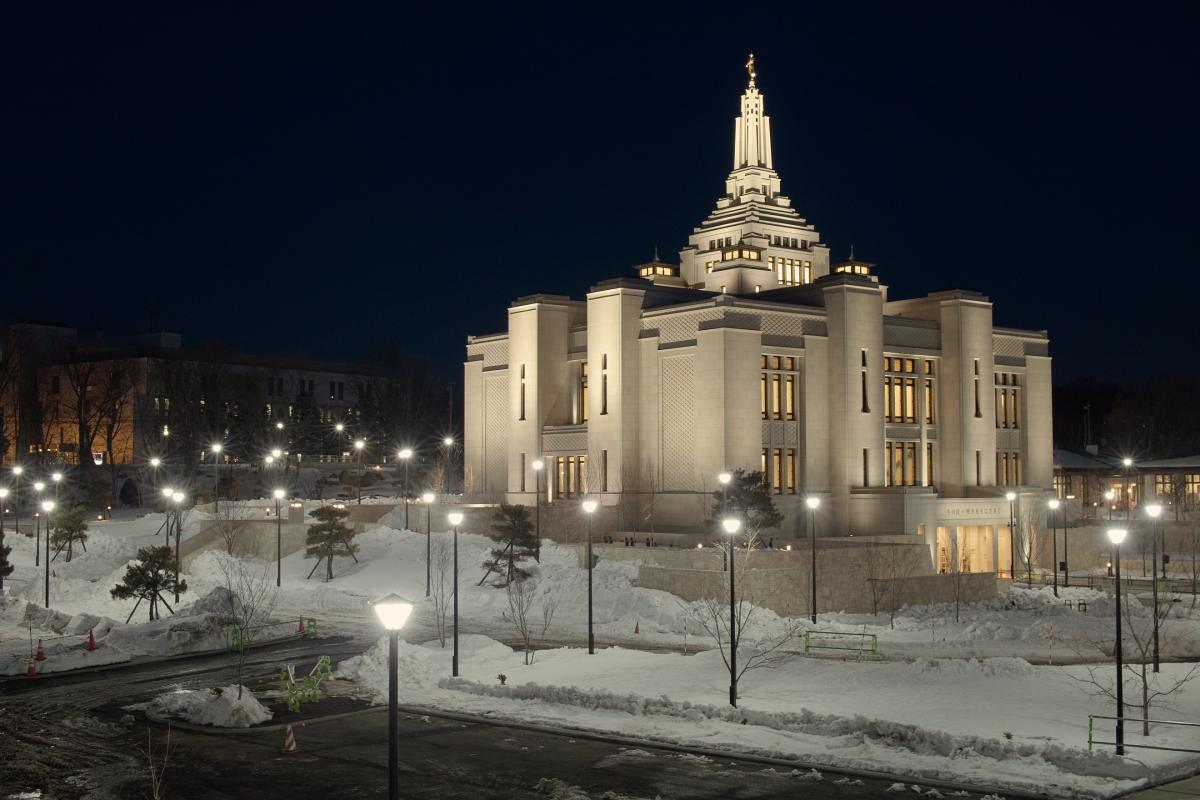
Sapporo Japan Temple

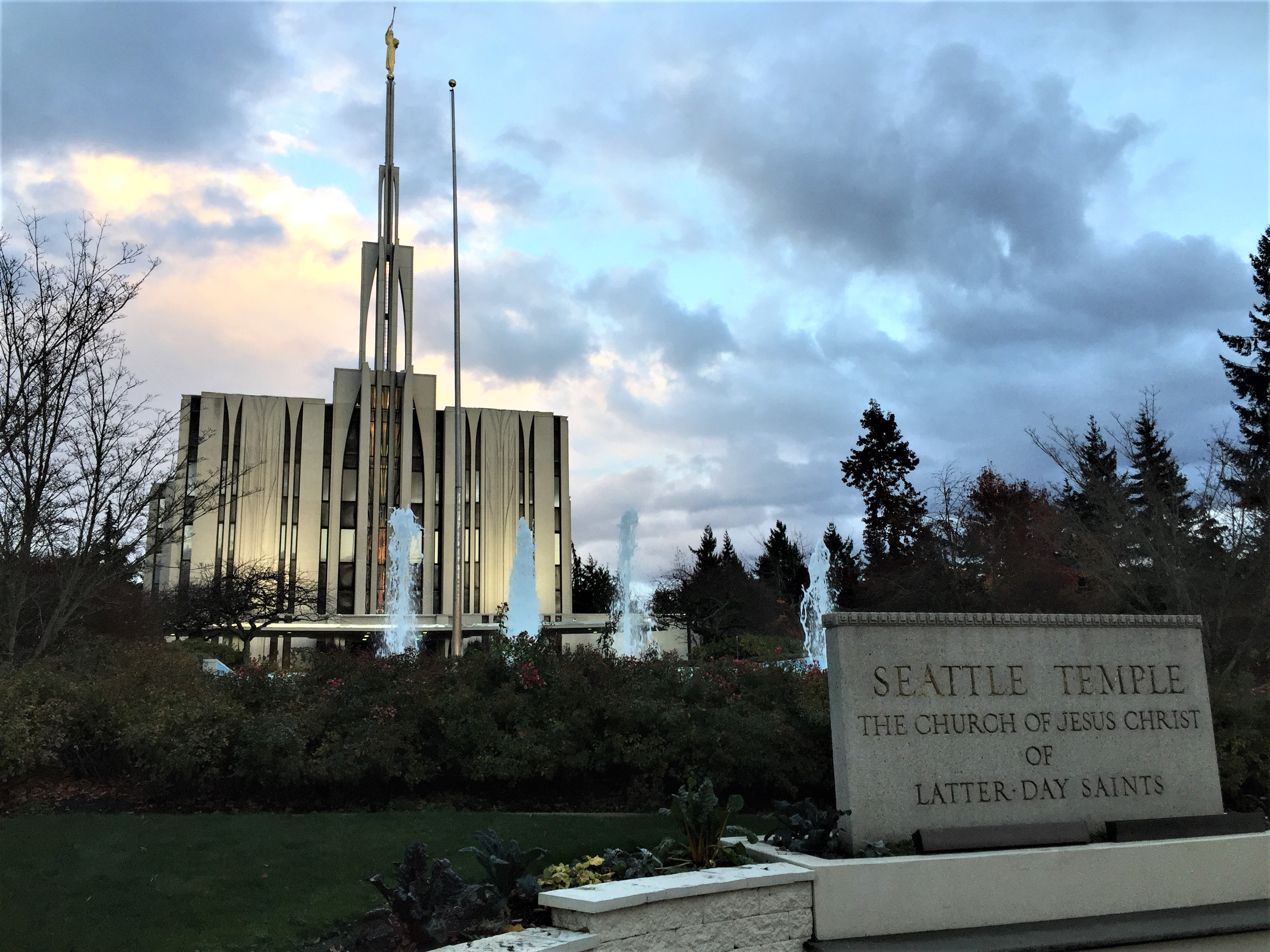
Seattle Washington Temple

=== Six-spire temples ===
The Boise Idaho Temple, announced in 1982, was the first built with a six-spire, sloped-roof design. Despite the six spires and sloped-roofs, temples in this style vary widely in design, size, capacity, and floorplan. Examples include the Portland Oregon and Las Vegas Nevada temples. Although they are around the same size, Portland has 8 additional ordinance rooms. Because of this, these temples are some of the most unique in the church.

This design was deemed inadequate as the Boise Idaho, Dallas Texas, and Chicago Illinois temples all required extensive remodels soon after opening. Because of this, only 14 temples ended up being built with this style.

All but three temples built between 1984 and 1989 are built in this style.

Six Spire Temples

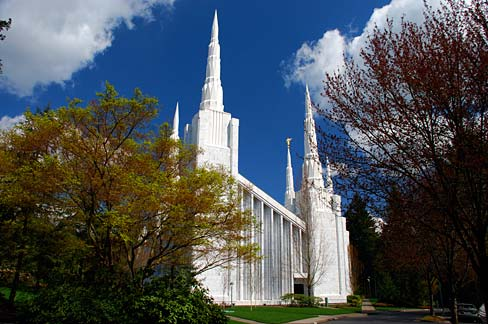
Portland Oregon Temple

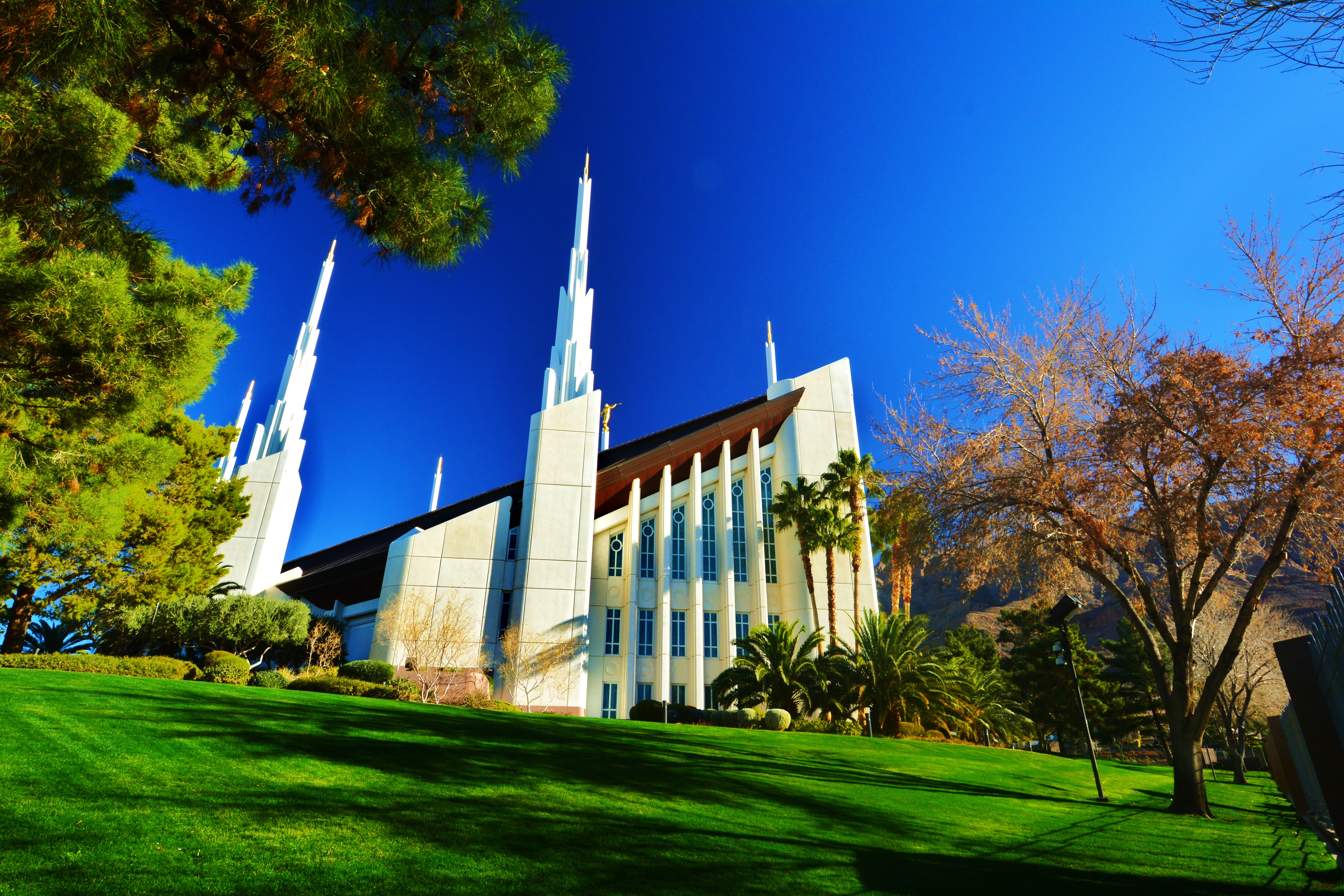
Las Vegas Nevada Temple

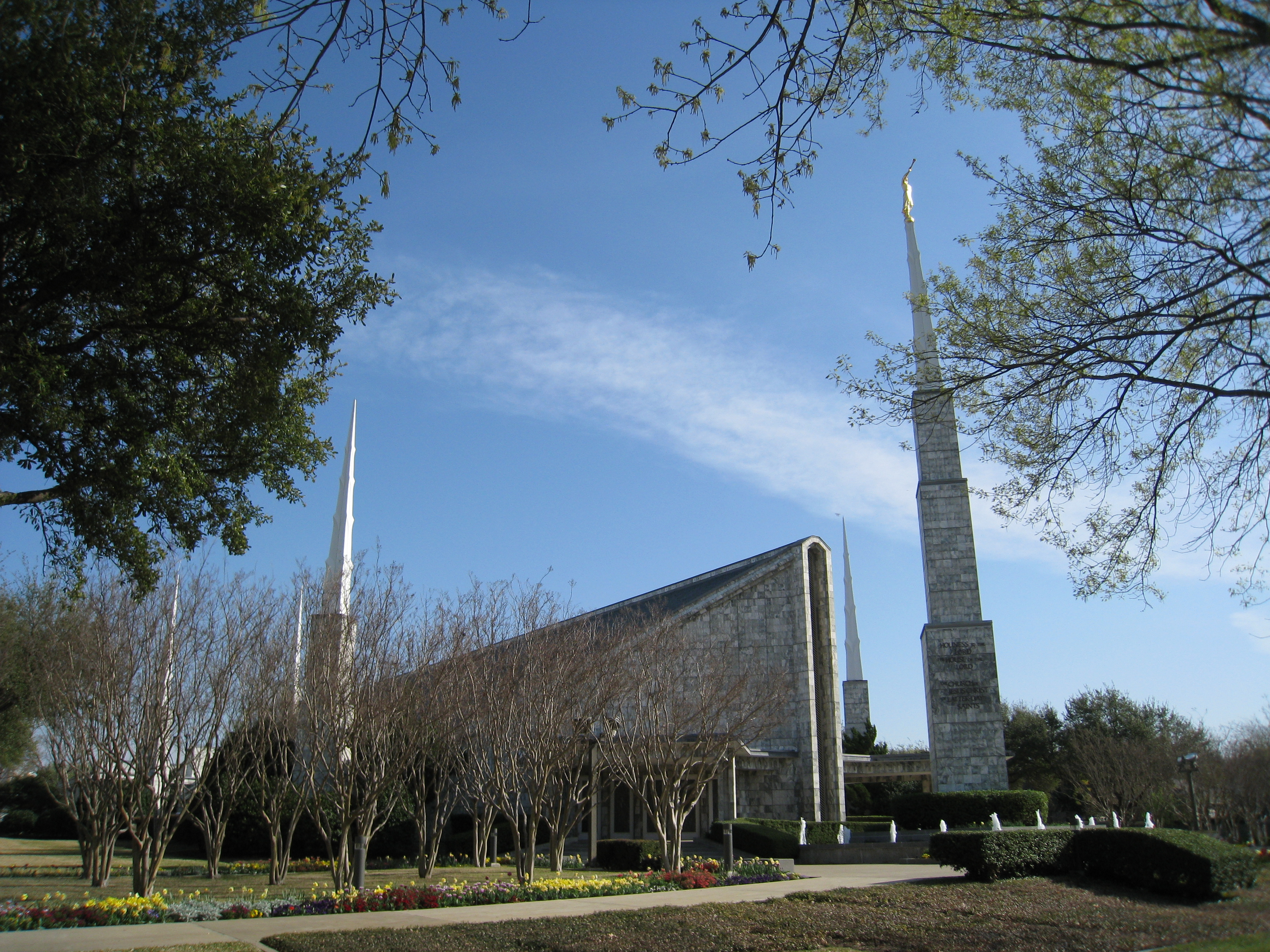
Dallas Texas Temple

=== Small design temples ===
In the October 1997 general conference, church president Gordon B. Hinckley announced plans to build multiple "smaller temples" in areas not as suitable for larger, standard-sized temples.

These temples were built adjacent to existing meetinghouses to share both office space and parking facilities. These temples have no office, laundry facilities, or waiting rooms, and have small changing rooms. The design typically includes a two-stage ordinance room rather than multiple rooms as often existed. A sealing room and baptistry are also included. Most of these temples, beginning with the Monticello Utah Temple, use the same floorplan. Three temples were initially built, followed by 38 more. Eventually, 60 temples were built using the small design, some with slight variations.

Some of these temples required additions to be added as more church members moved into areas serviced by these temples.

Small Design Temples

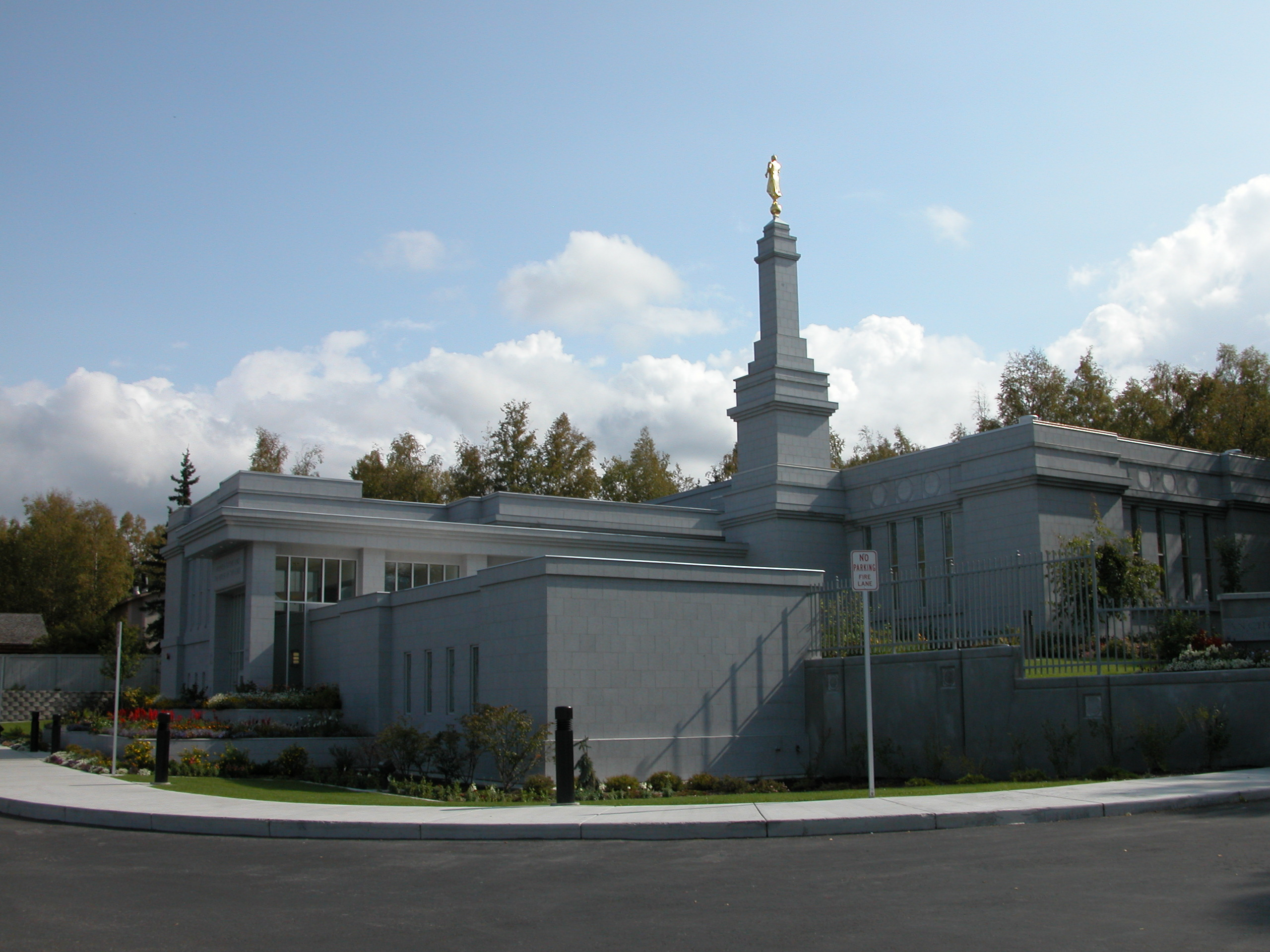
Anchorage Alaska Temple

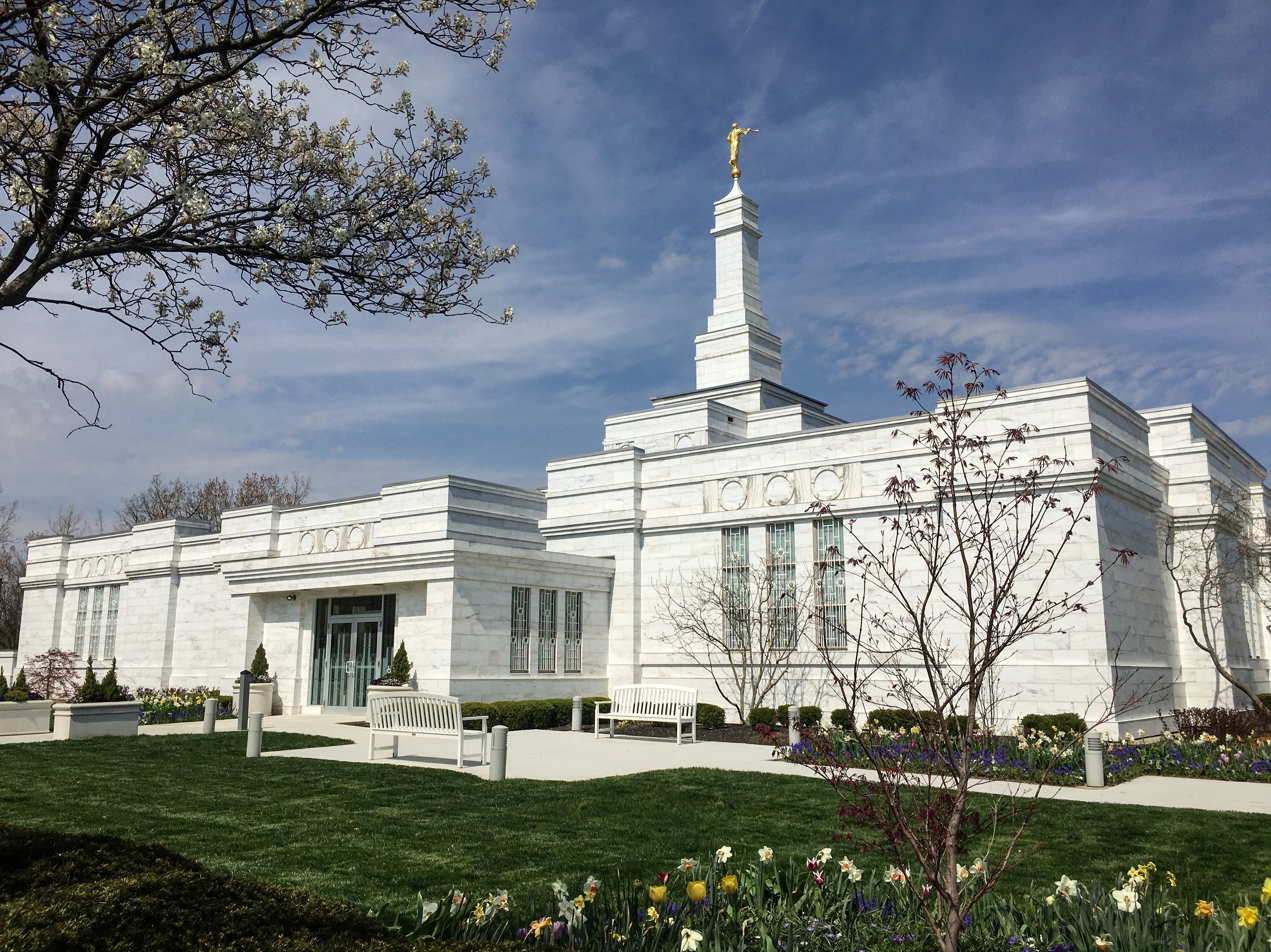
Columbus Ohio Temple

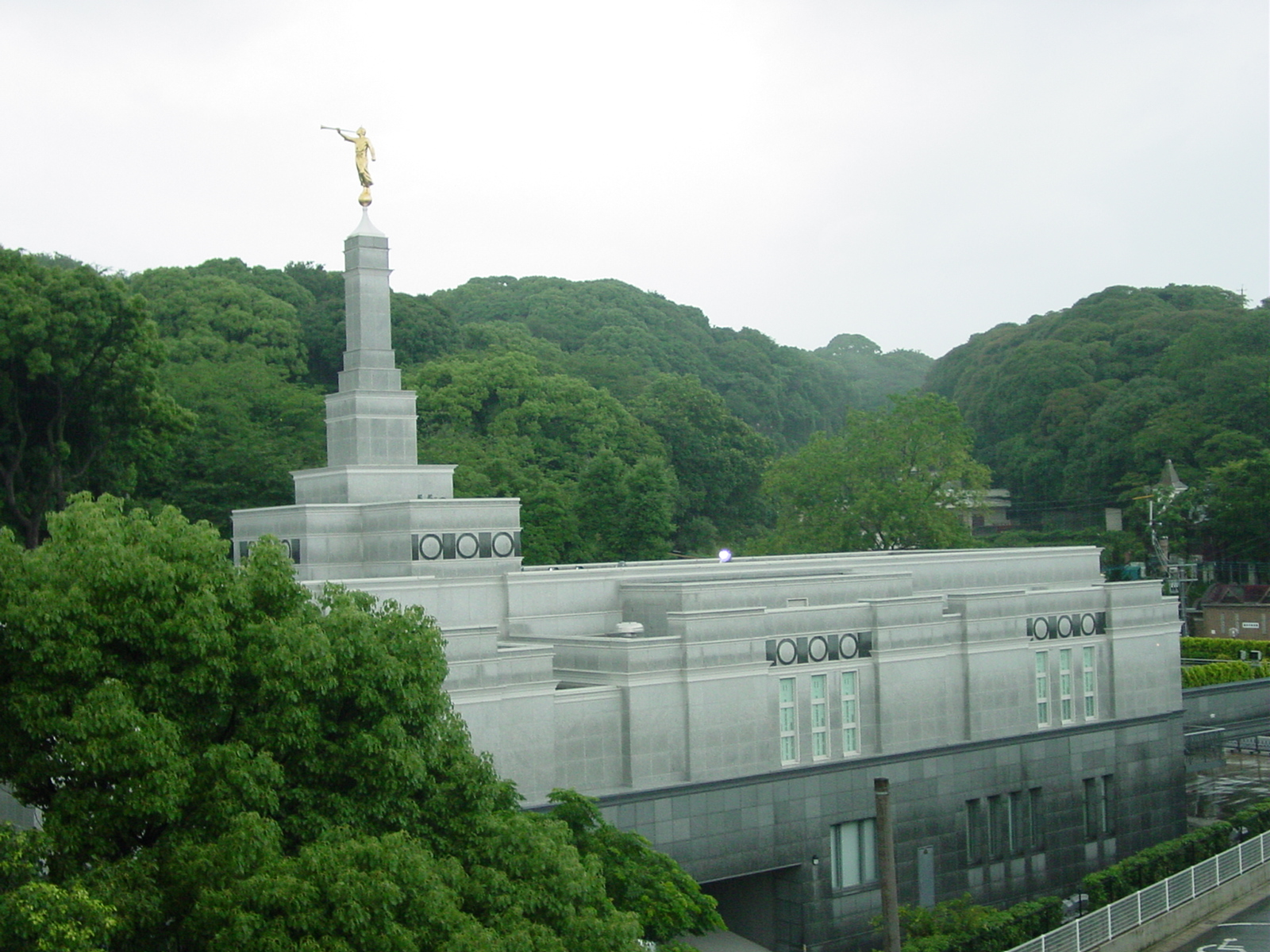
Fukuoka Japan Temple

=== Repurposed temples ===
Four temples have been built by refurbishing non-temple buildings.

The first, the Vernal Utah Temple, was built in the old Uintah Stake Tabernacle. After the tabernacle was replaced by a new stake center in 1948, the tabernacle fell into disuse. In 1984, the church announced the tabernacle's closure due to "public safety reasons." A petition was formed to save the tabernacle building and in 1994, the church decided to retrofit it into a temple. The temple was completed in 1997.

The Copenhagen Denmark Temple was opened in 2004 after converting an old meetinghouse, the Priorvej Chapel, that was built by local church members in 1931. The building had also served as a bomb shelter during World War II.

The Manhattan New York Temple opened immediately after the Copenhagen Denmark Temple. It was adapted from an existing stake center across from the Lincoln Center on the Upper West Side. Parts of the building are still used as a meetinghouse as well as a Family History Center. The temple occupies parts of the first floor and all of the fourth, fifth, and sixth floors of the building. The interiors of these floors were completely renovated and the walls were soundproofed so traffic noise would not interrupt temple patrons. The church closed this temple in 2024 for major renovations.

On October 1, 2011, it was announced that the Provo Tabernacle, which had been burned by a fire, would be converted into the Provo City Center Temple, the second temple in Provo, Utah.

Repurposed Temples

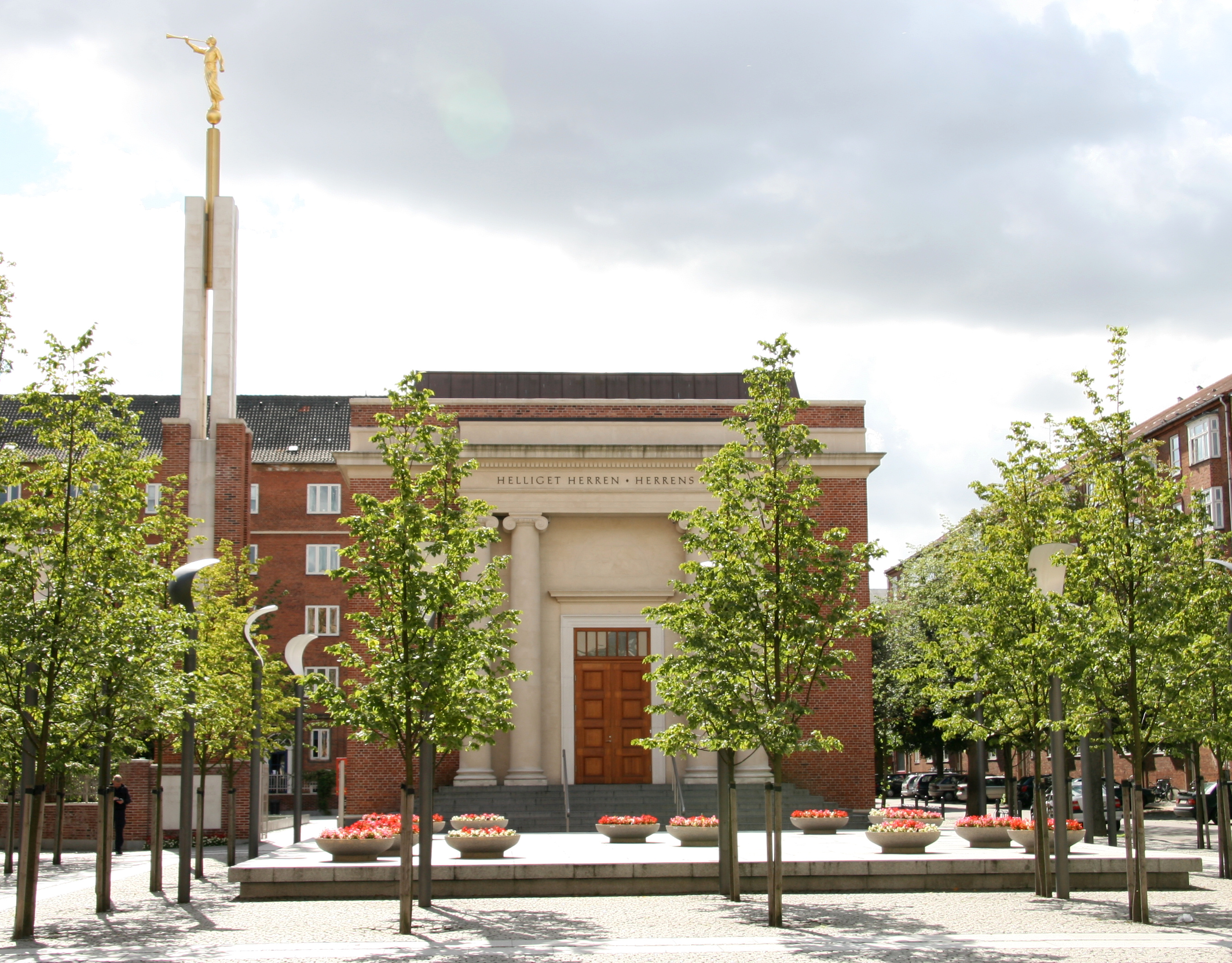
Copenhagen Denmark Temple

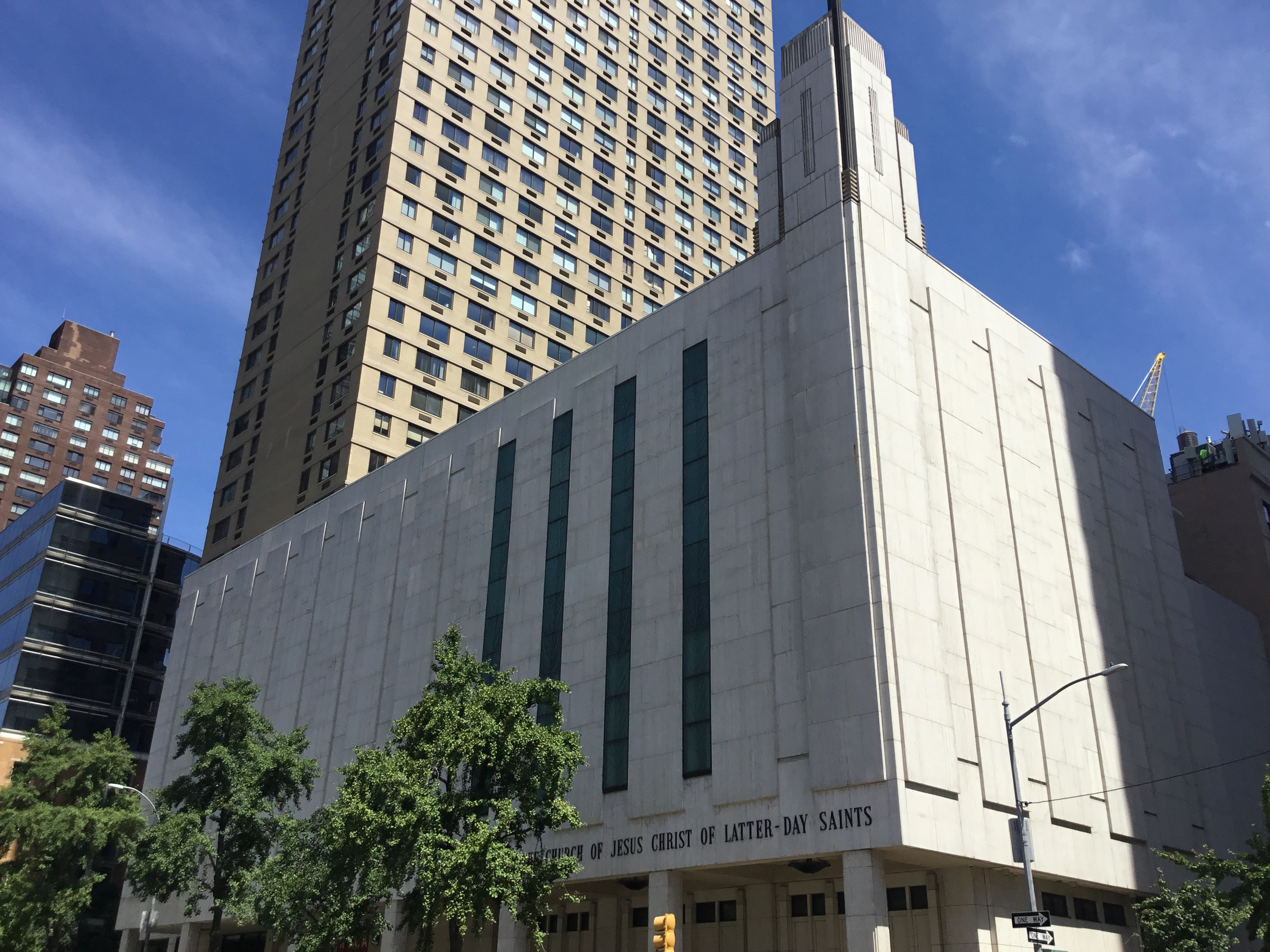
Manhattan New York Temple

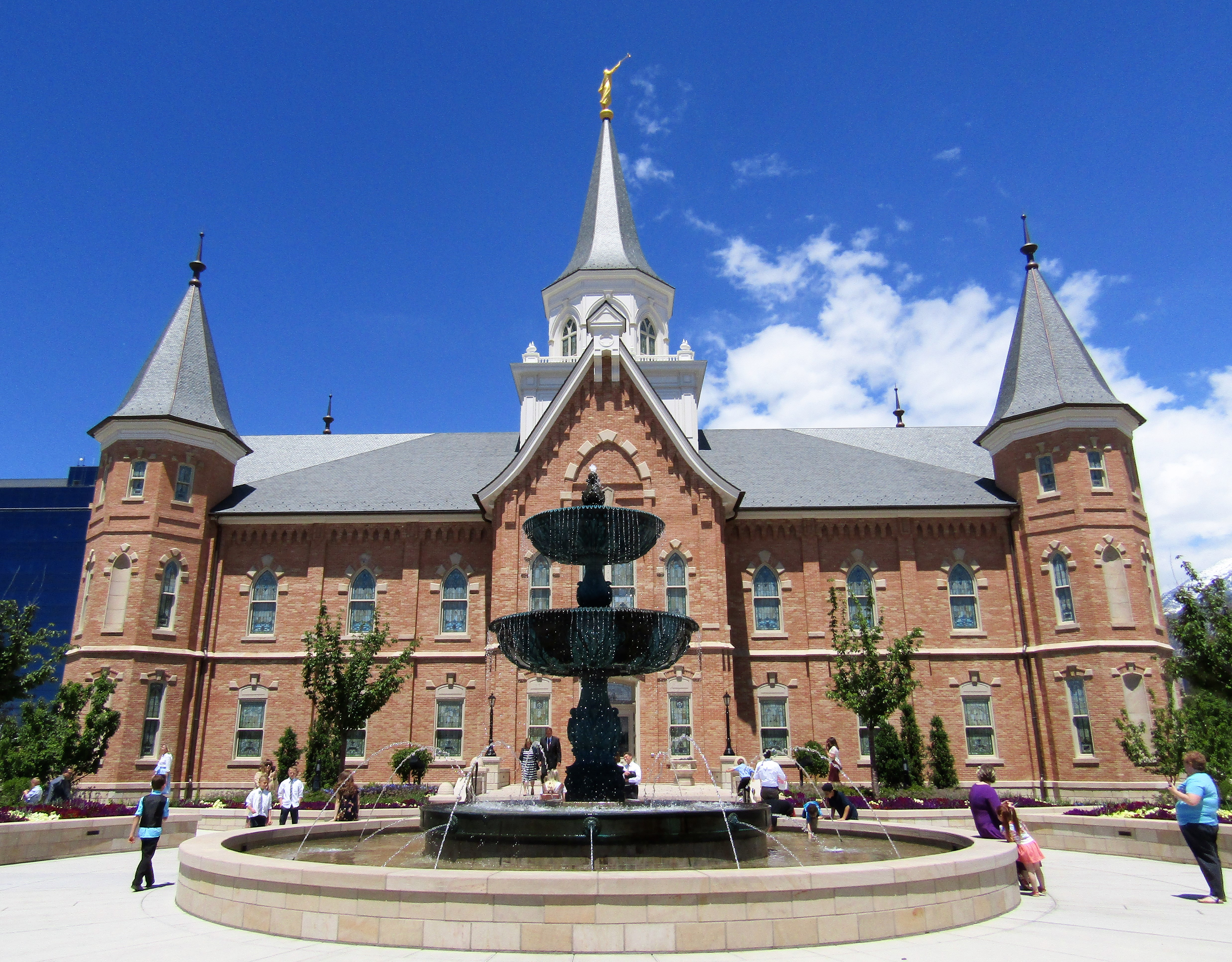
Provo City Center Temple

== Meetinghouses ==
LDS Church meetinghouses are used for weekly worship services as well as various social and community activities and events. Meetinghouses serve anywhere from one to a few wards or branches (congregations). A larger meetinghouse, known as a stake center, also houses offices for local stake leadership. Meetinghouses vary widely in terms of architectural style but have for the most part been standardized in modern times.

Unlike most Christian denominations, Latter-day Saints do not generally use the cross as a symbol for their church. Noticeably, this means that most meetinghouses instead use a pointed steeple instead of a cross.

=== Pre-standardization ===
==== Early and pioneer meetinghouses ====
Early meetinghouses varied widely in style. Originally, Latter-day Saints used houses of local members (and in some very isolated communities, still do). As the church grew, specific meetinghouses were built or retrofitted to serve local congregations.

After the Mormon pioneers made their way west to Utah, they began to build permanent buildings, more reminiscent of "modern" churches. The styles varied widely and were often built by local members.

==== Early modern meetinghouses ====
After the early pioneer era, around the 1880s–90s, most meetinghouses were built by local members with most of the funding from the church. Because of the lack of official standardization in building plans, these buildings varied in architectural style but most often used either romanesque revival or prairie architecture. They were generally designed by local members, occasionally with assistance from church architects.

This era of meetinghouses, especially the chapels, were often very ornate, often featuring murals and stained glass, an uncommon sight in contemporary meetinghouses.

Pre-standardization Meetinghouses

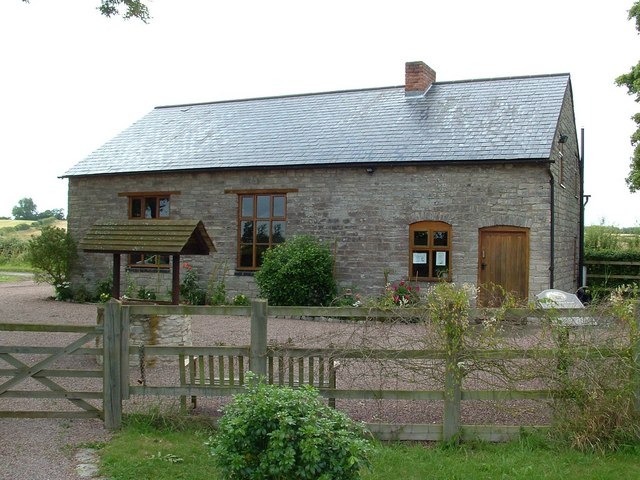
Gadfield Elm Chapel. The oldest extant LDS Meetinghouse. Located in England

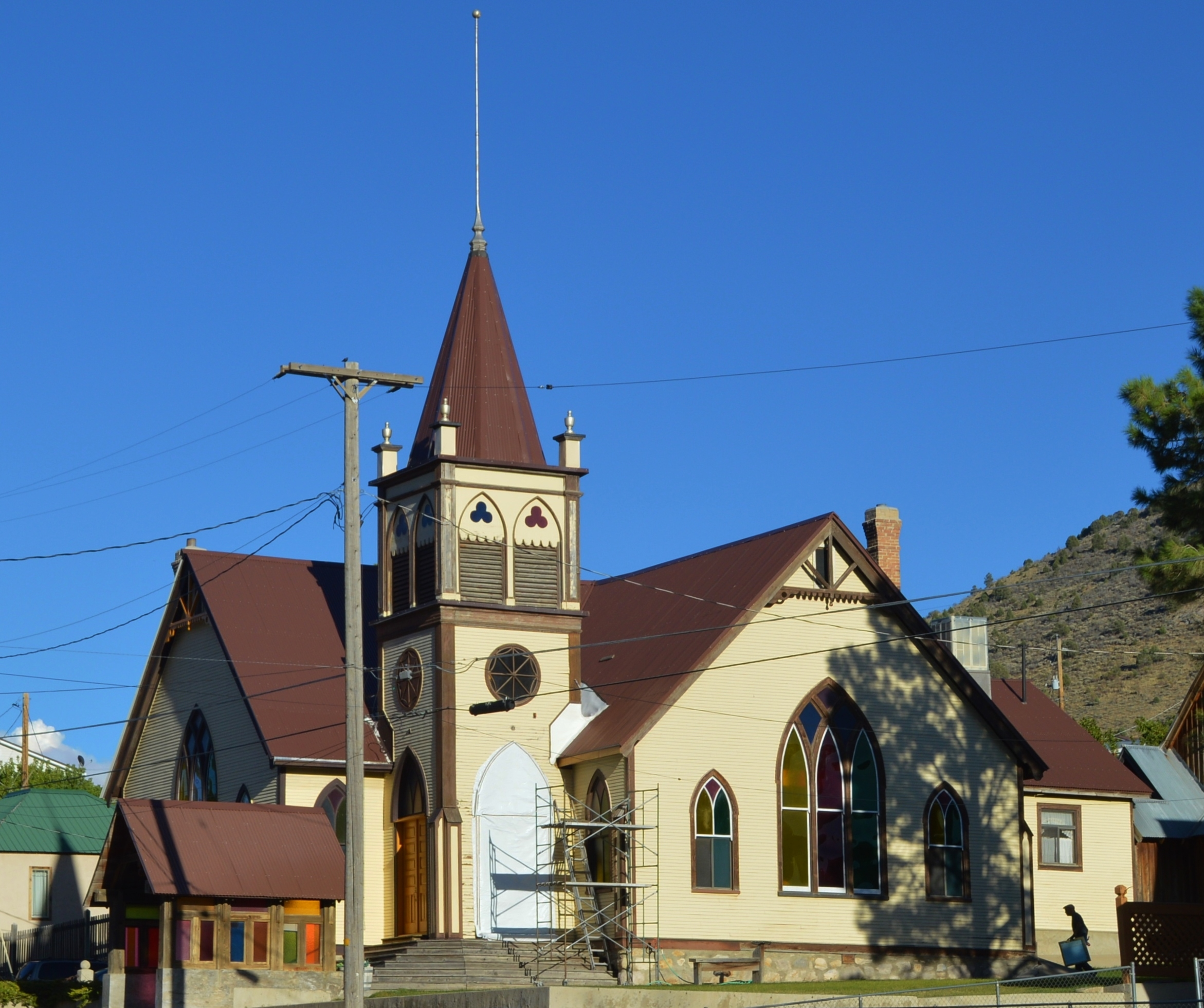
A pioneer-era church in Eureka, Utah

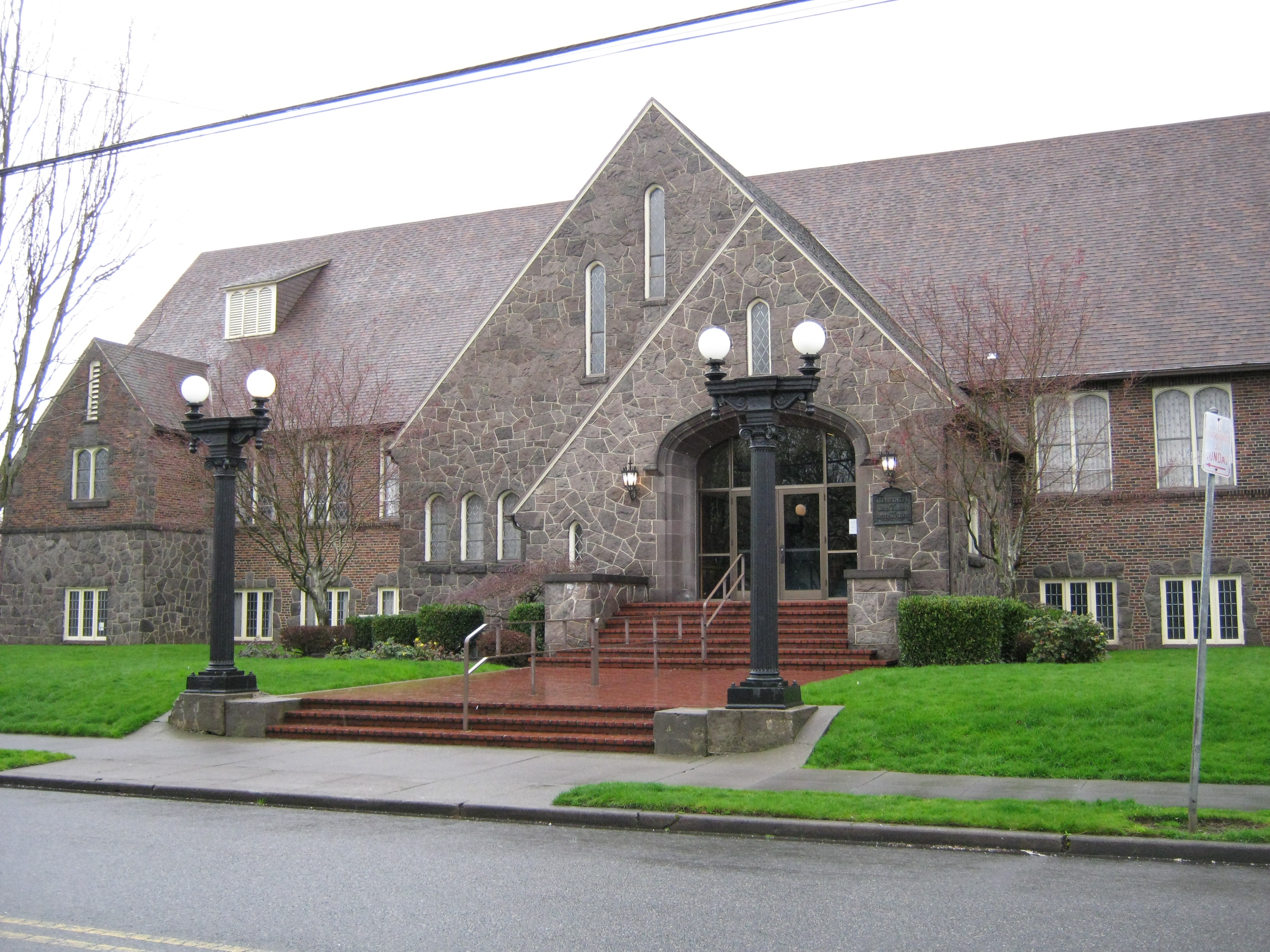
The Portland Stake Tabernacle. Built 1929

=== Early standardization ===
Starting in the late 1930s, the church began to standardize meetinghouse plans. The standardization primarily affected the exterior of buildings and the interior floorplan still varied widely. The plans called for an International Style of architecture with hints of classical. Some of these buildings still featured stained glass, though without artwork. These buildings were almost always built in the center of residential neighborhoods, and often either did not feature parking lots, or had very small lots.

Early standardization Meetinghouses

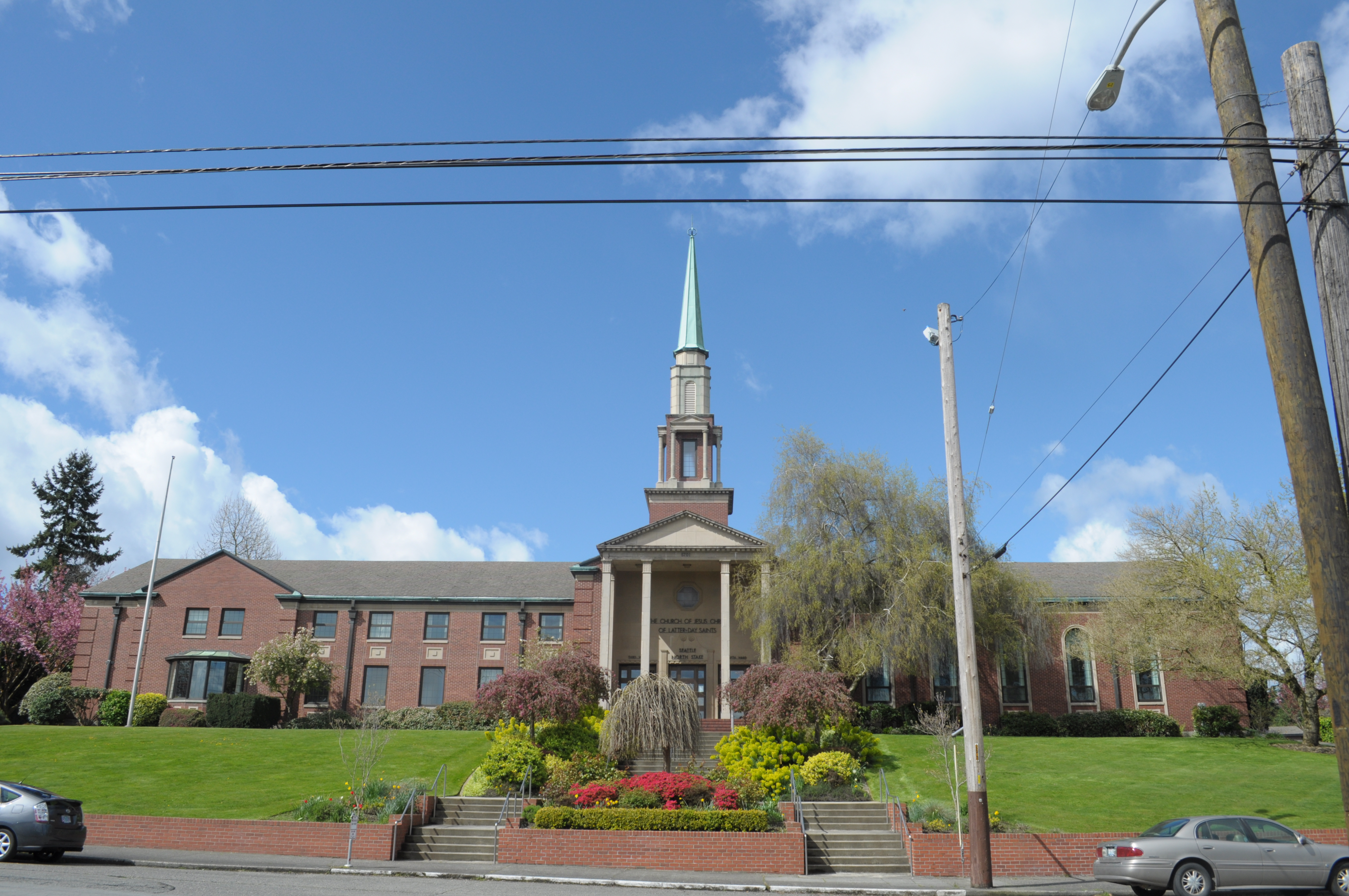
Seattle, Washington

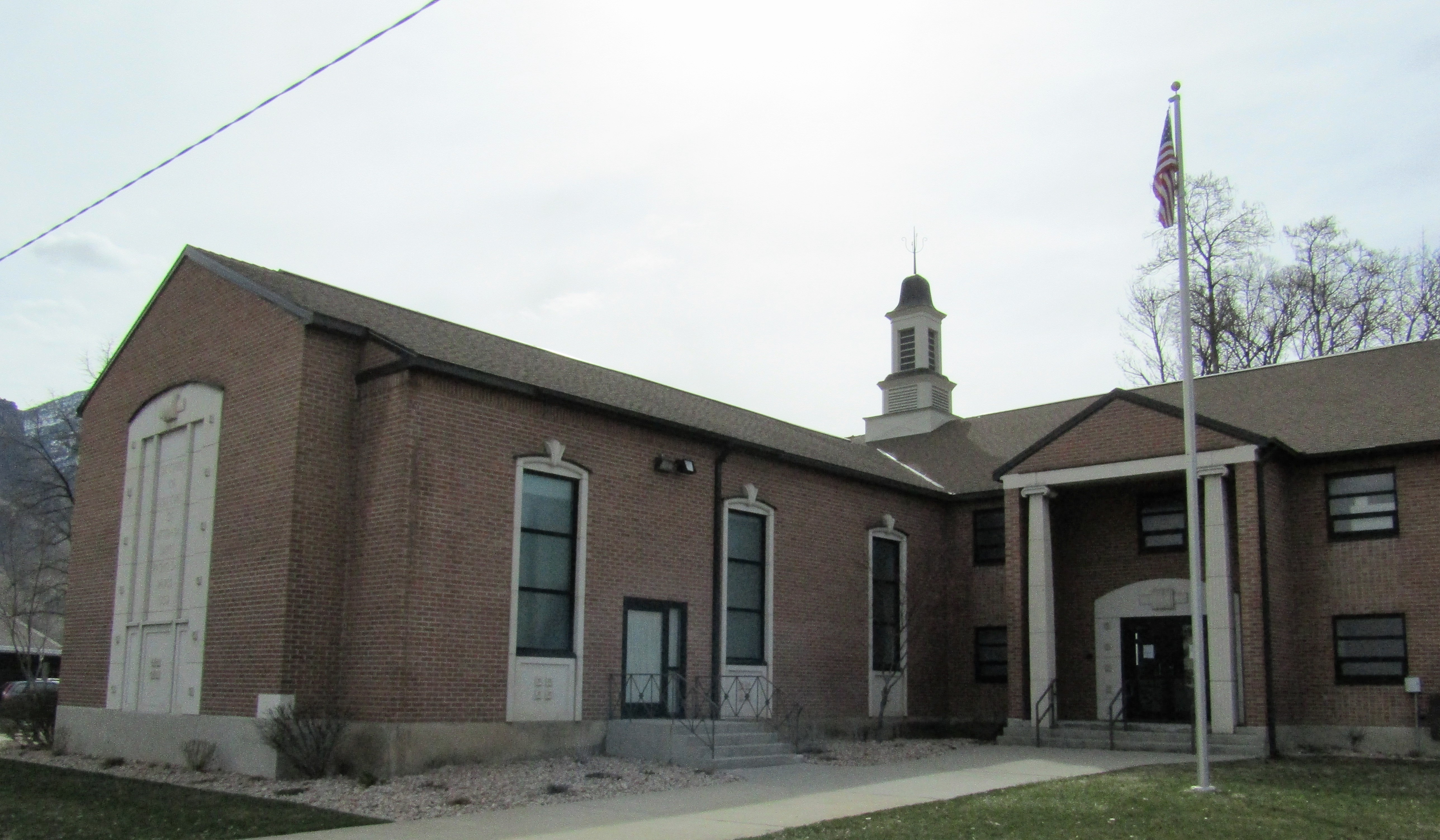
Provo, Utah

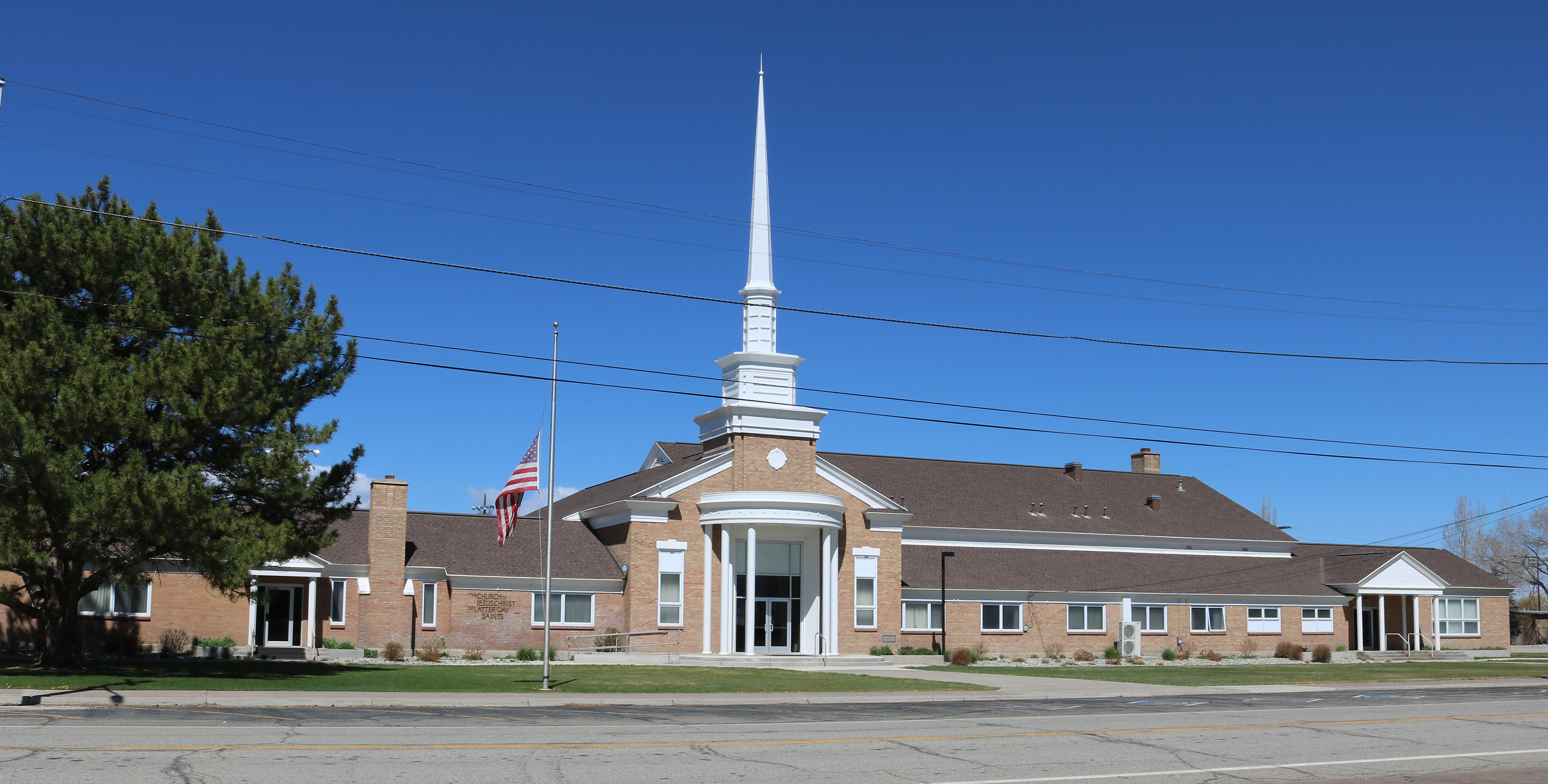
Sanford, Colorado

=== Standardization ===
In 1980, the LDS Church released its first three standardized floorplans for meetinghouses in the United States. One plan for branches or small wards, another for standard sized wards, and another for stake centers. All meetinghouses built after this point, with some exceptions, were built according to or very similar to these standard plans. Additional standard plans were also introduced later in the 1980s to allow for slightly more variation. In the 1990s, the church updated its standard plans and has updated them again slightly throughout the 2000s through the present. These meetinghouses are uniquely designed by members of the Church Architecture, Engineering & Construction Division (AEC). They incorporate traditional architecture with hints of various other styles depending on location.

Elsewhere in the world, the LDS Church has created standardized floorplans that better fit in with the culture and geography of individual countries and regions. In tropical locations, the roofs tend to be thicker and the meetinghouses smaller. They are often light green or white as opposed to the standard brick or stone of the United States.

Standardized Meetinghouses (North America)

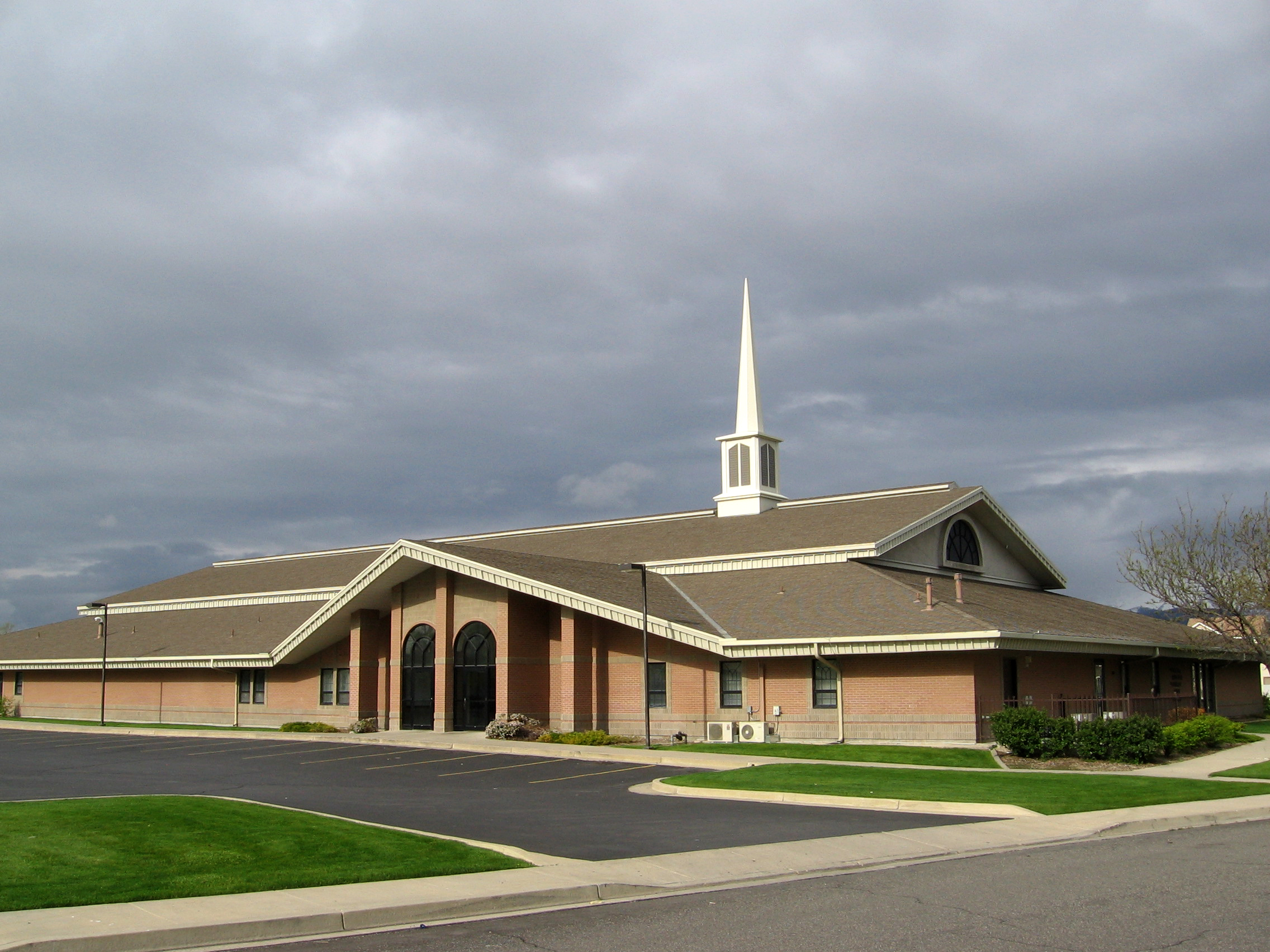
Standardized design (1980s)

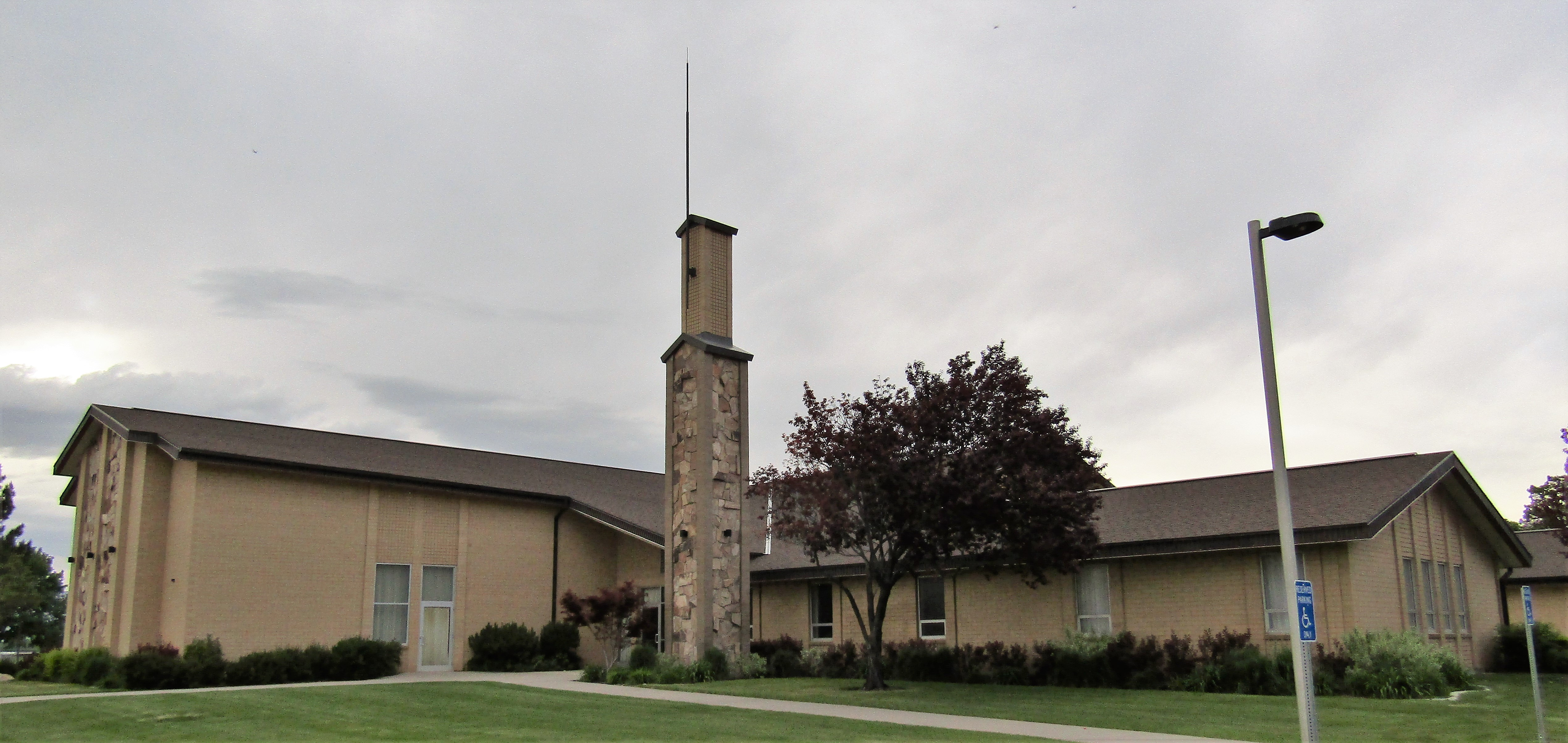
Standardized design (1980s)

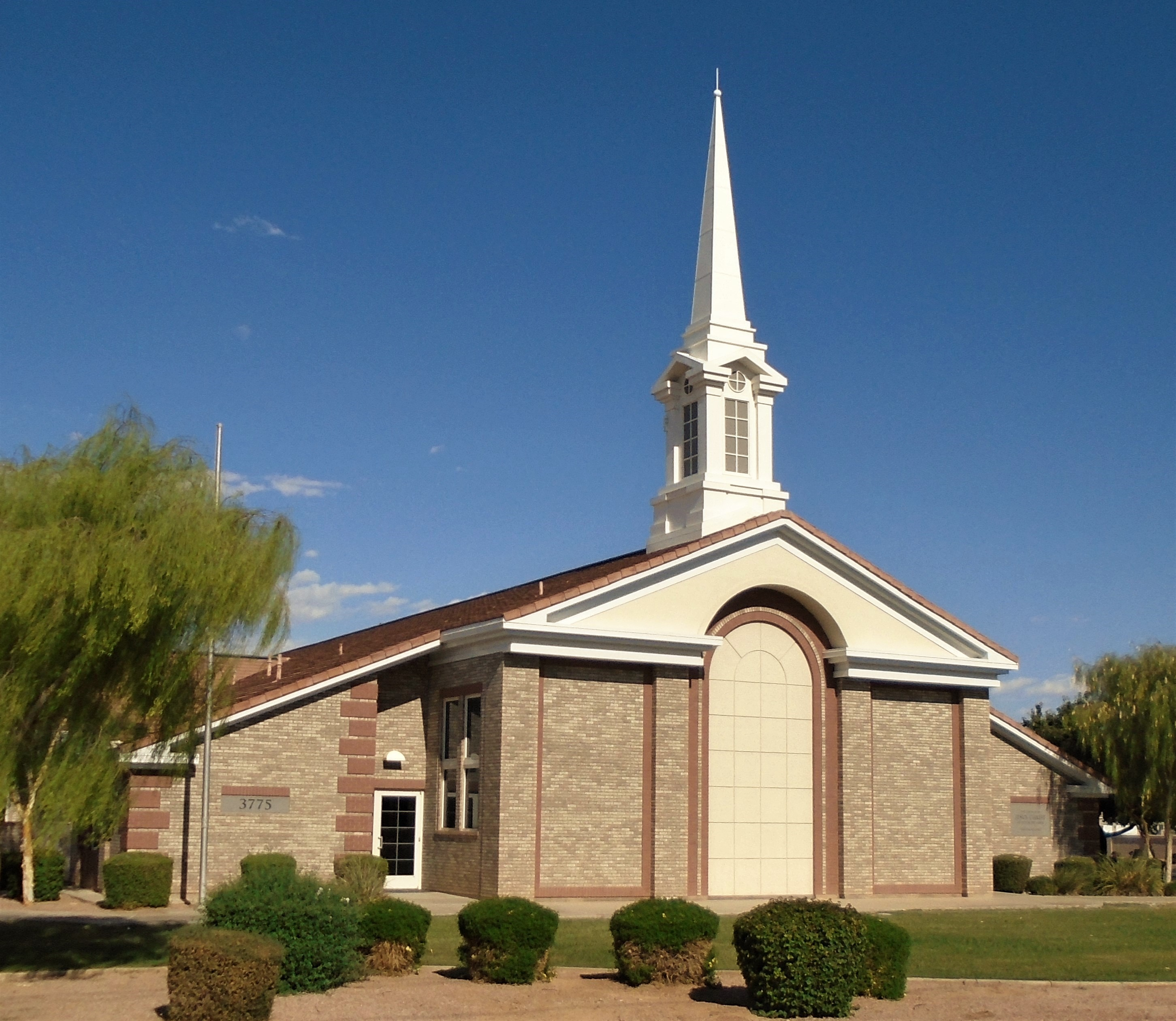
Standardized design (1990s-2020s)

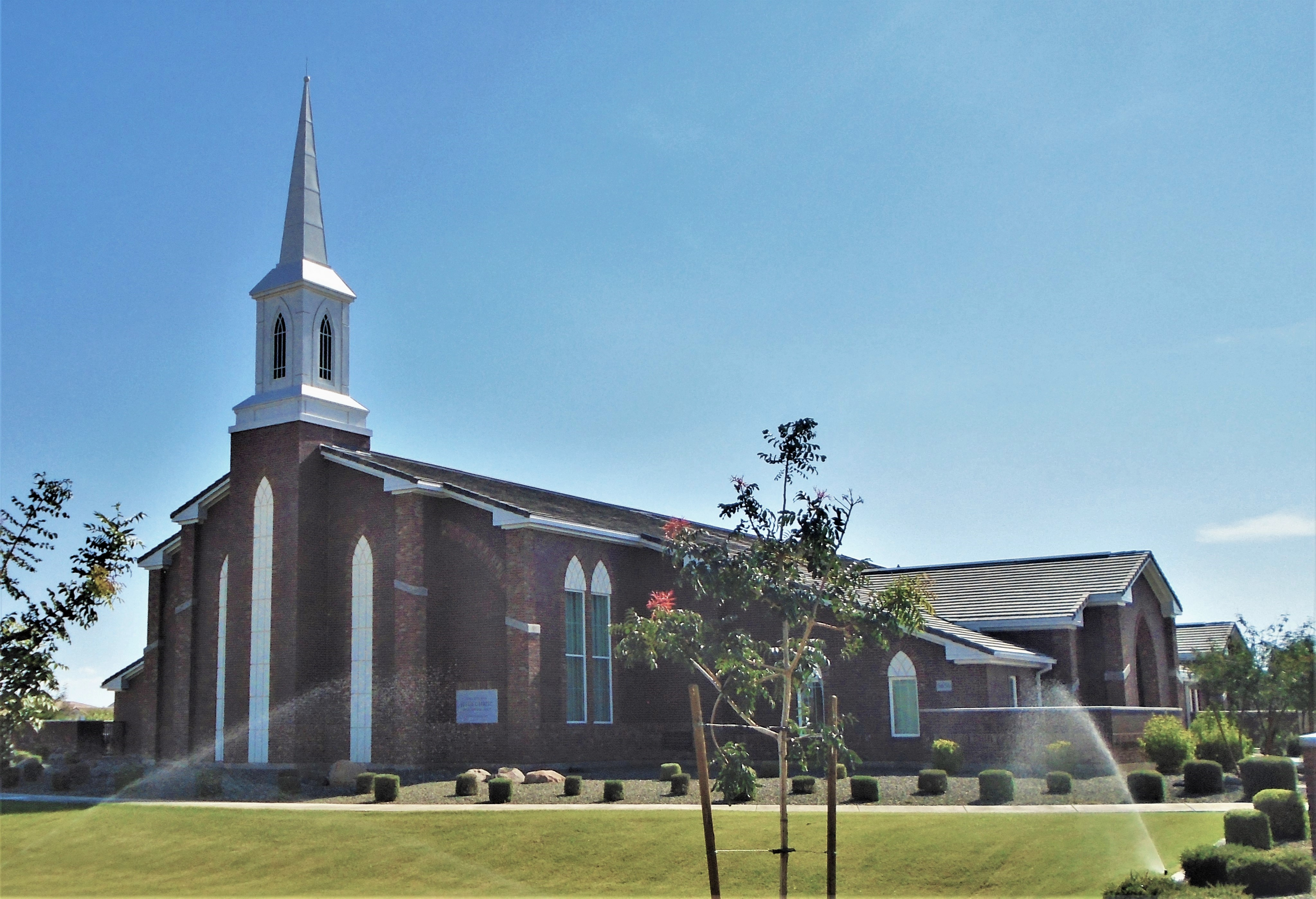
Standardized design (2000s-2020s)
Standardized Meetinghouses (International)

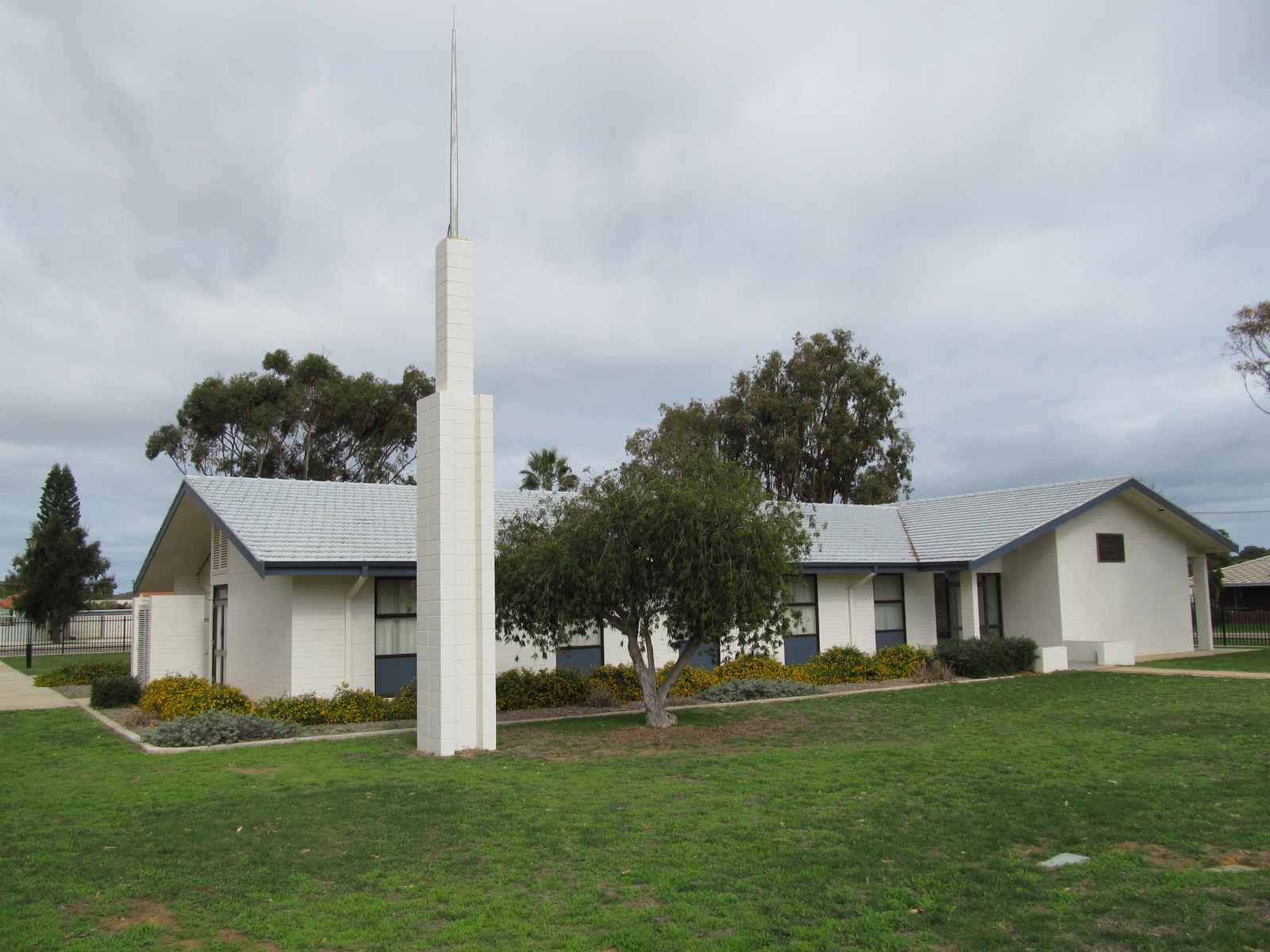
Standardized design (Oceania)

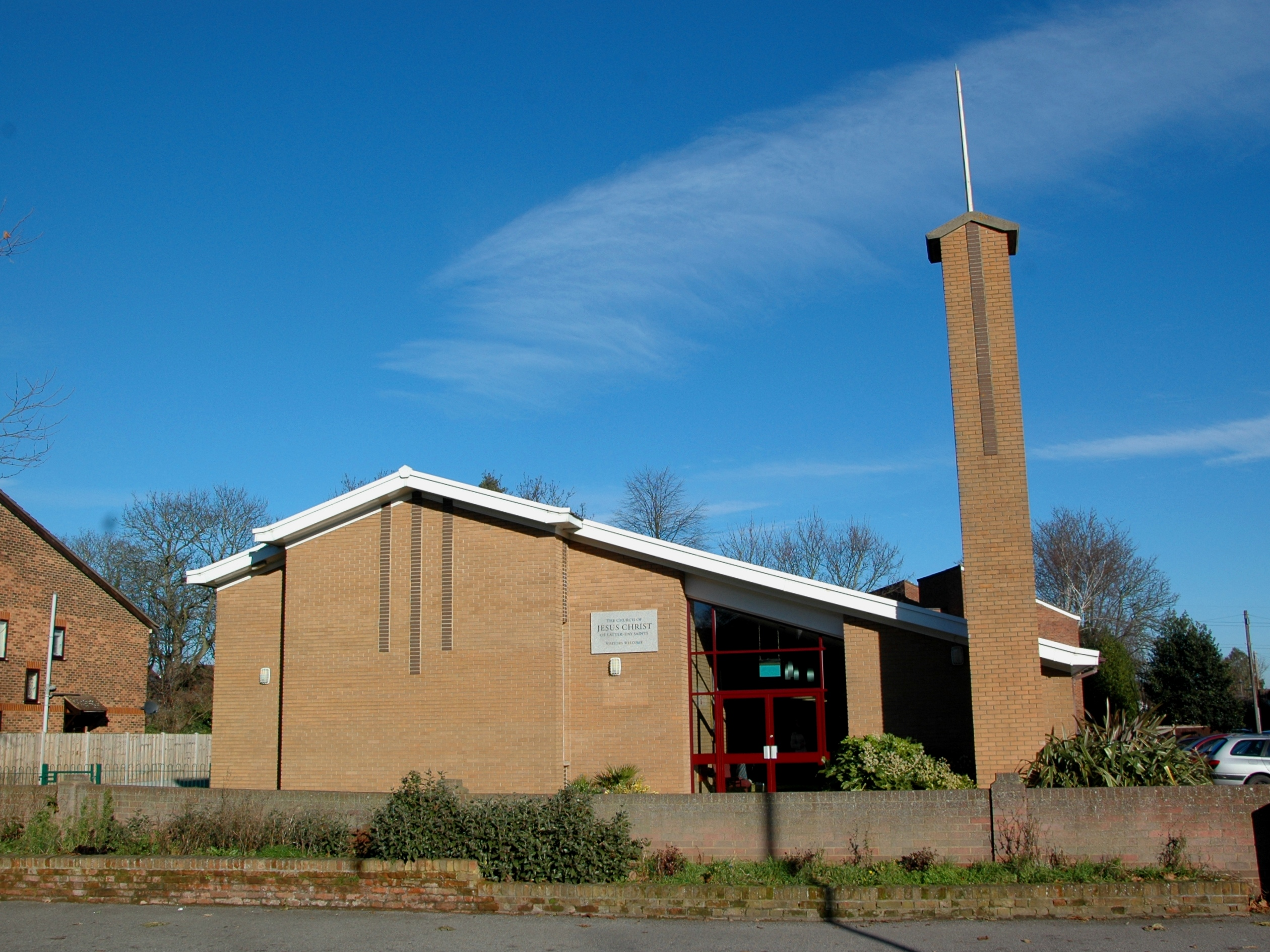
Standardized design (United Kingdom)

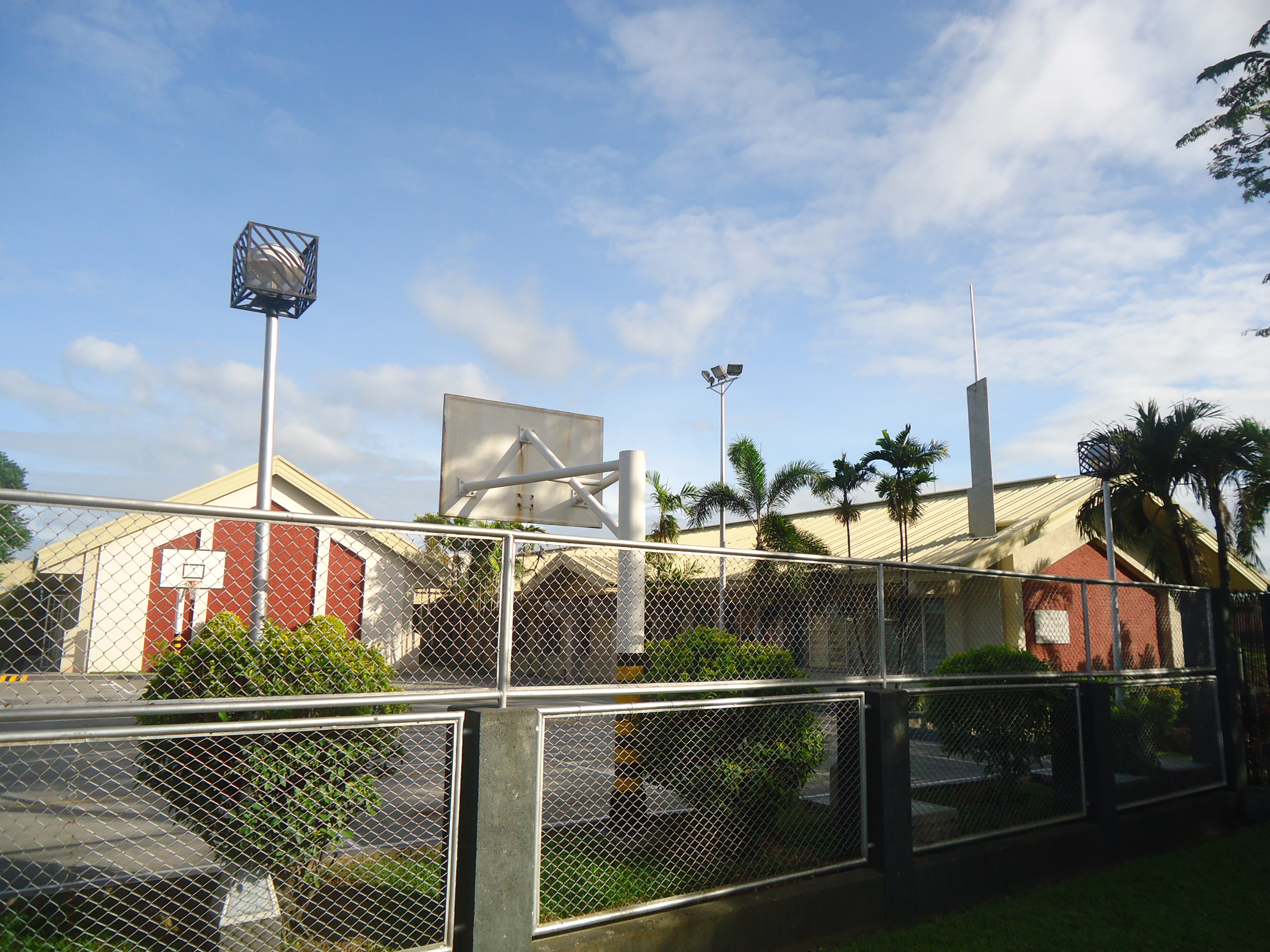
Standardized design (Tropical locations)

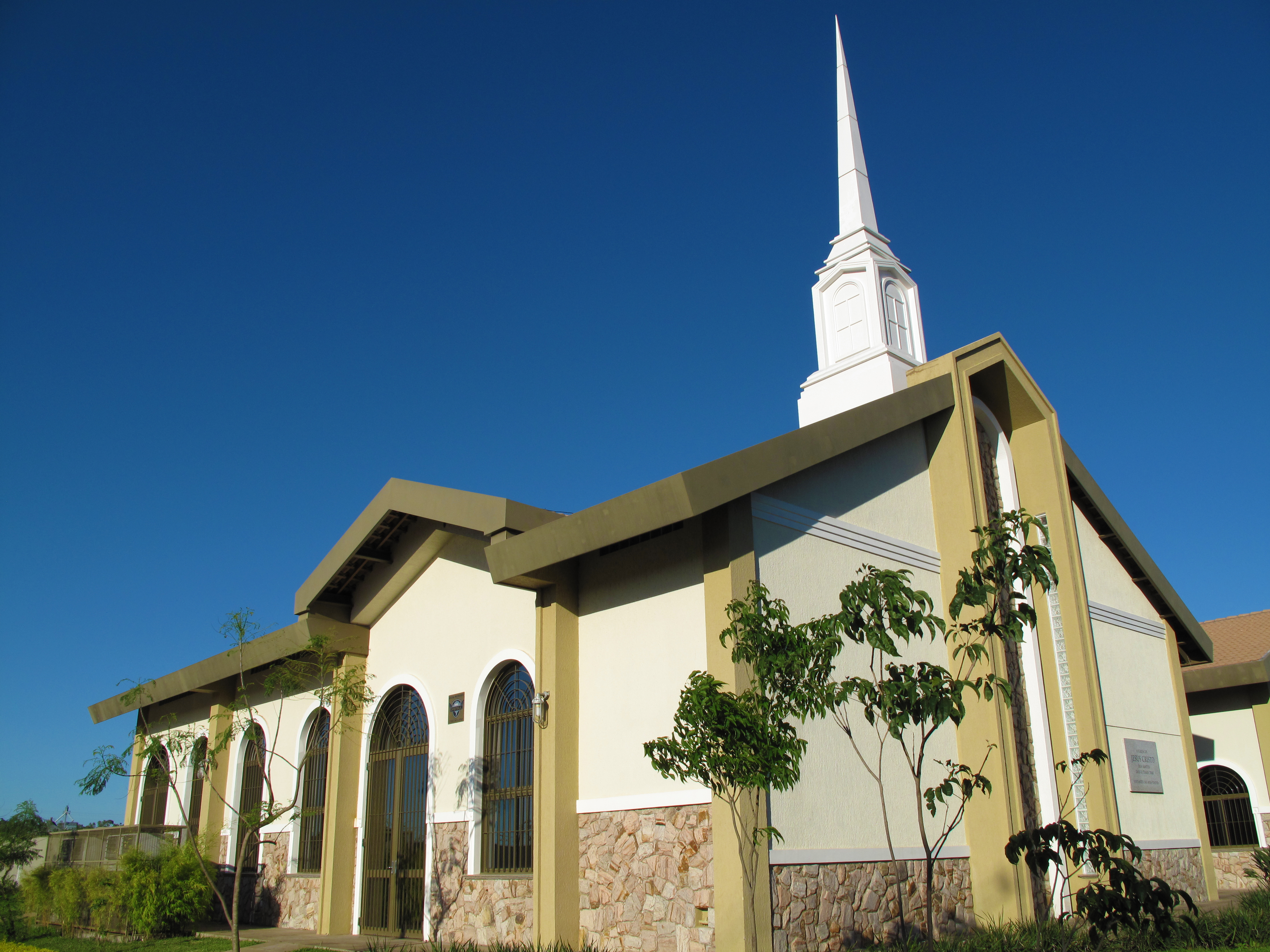
Standardized design (Tropical locations)

== Seminaries and institutes ==
In the United States, the LDS Church operates seminaries and Institutes of Religion for high schoolers and college students, respectively. These building are generally uniform, though in places with very large populations of Latter-day Saint students, may be much larger than the average seminary or institute. These buildings tend to small and practical, containing only a foyer, classrooms, necessary offices, and occasionally a cultural hall.

While Institutes of Religion are located at most major American universities, seminaries are generally only located in heavily Latter-day Saint states like Utah, Idaho, Wyoming, and Oregon.

Seminaries and Institutes

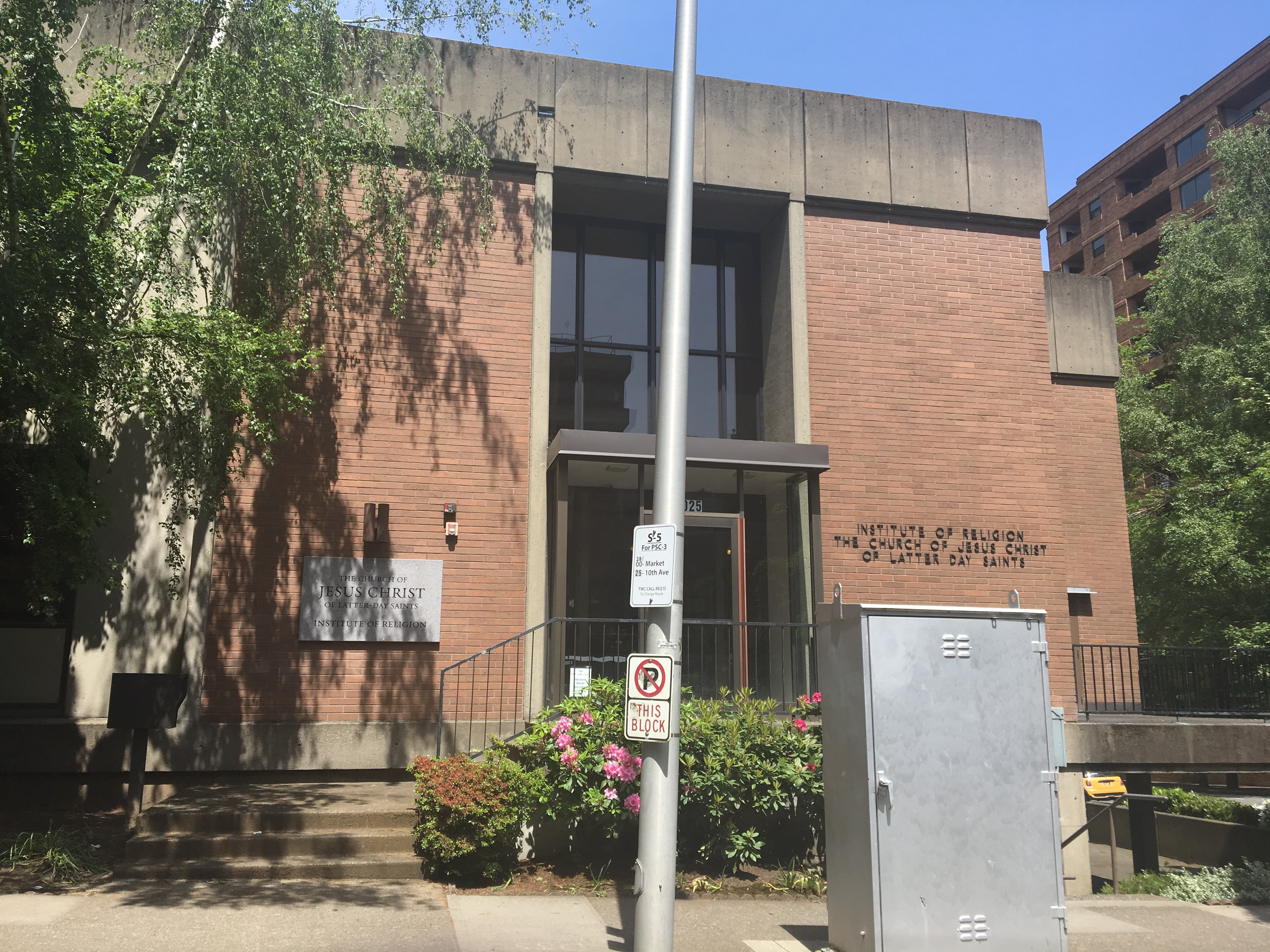
An Institute of Religion at Portland State University in Oregon

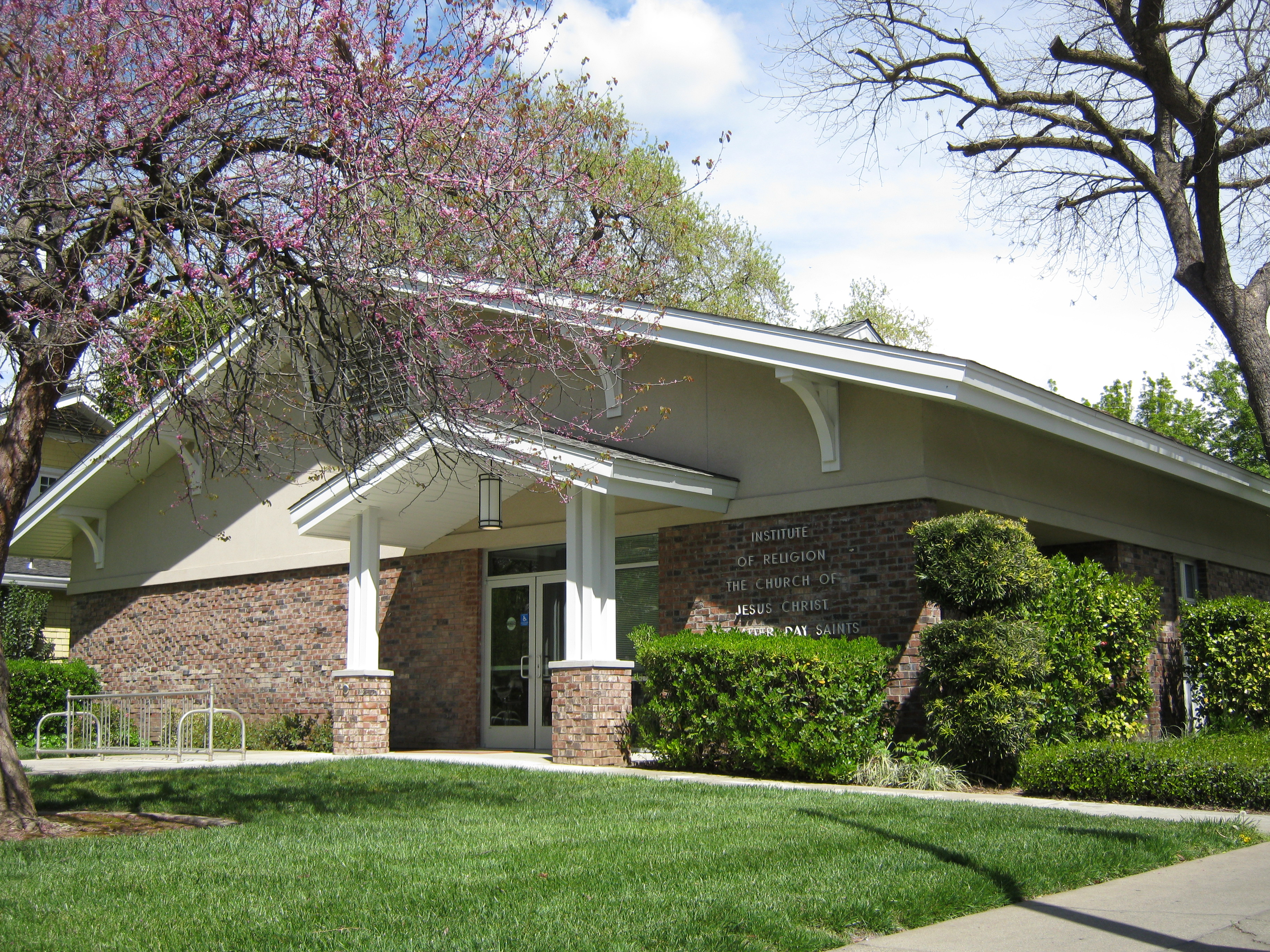
An Institute of Religion at California State University, Chico

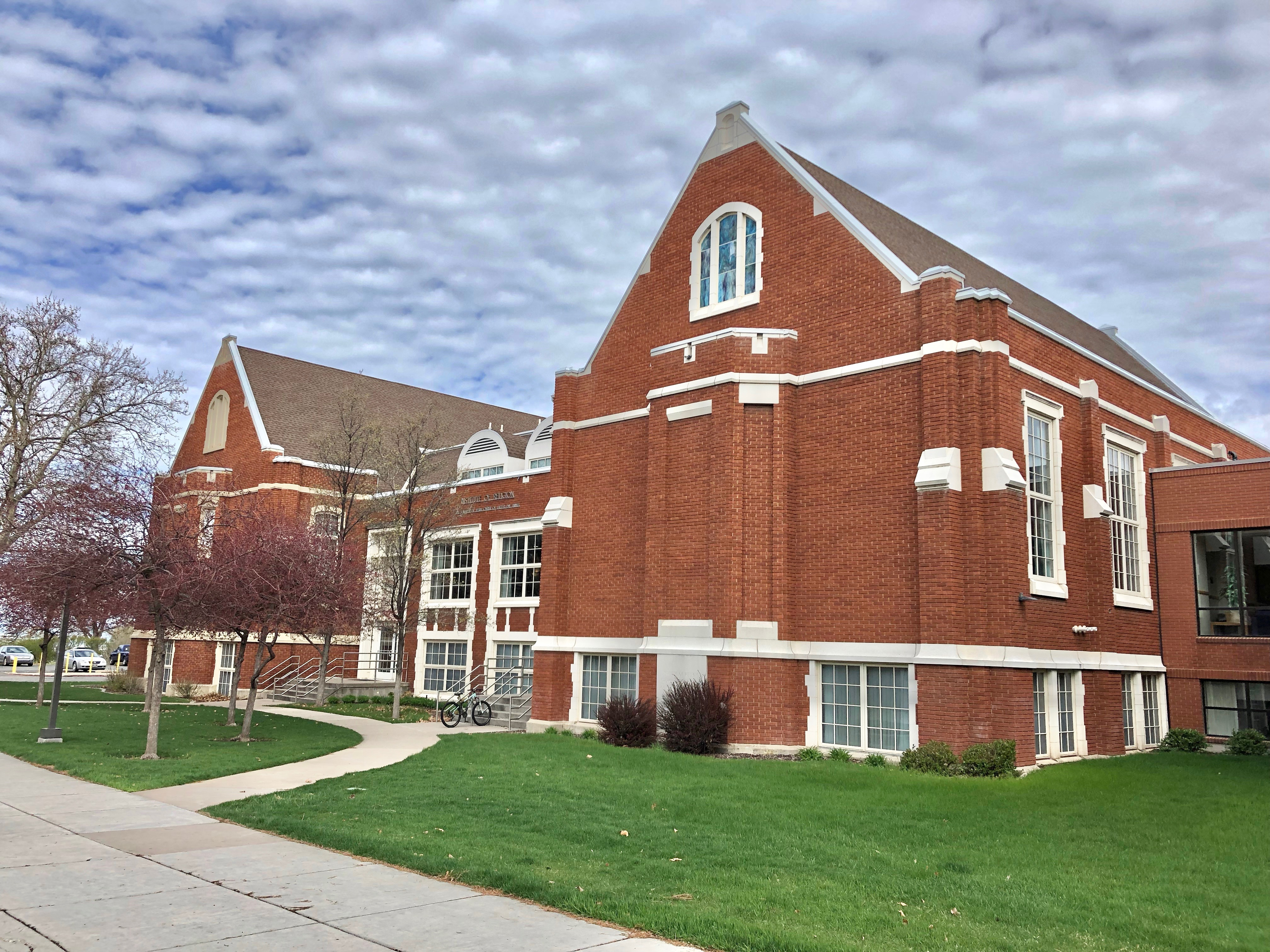
An Institute of Religion at Utah State University, larger than most due to the large population of Mormon students in Utah

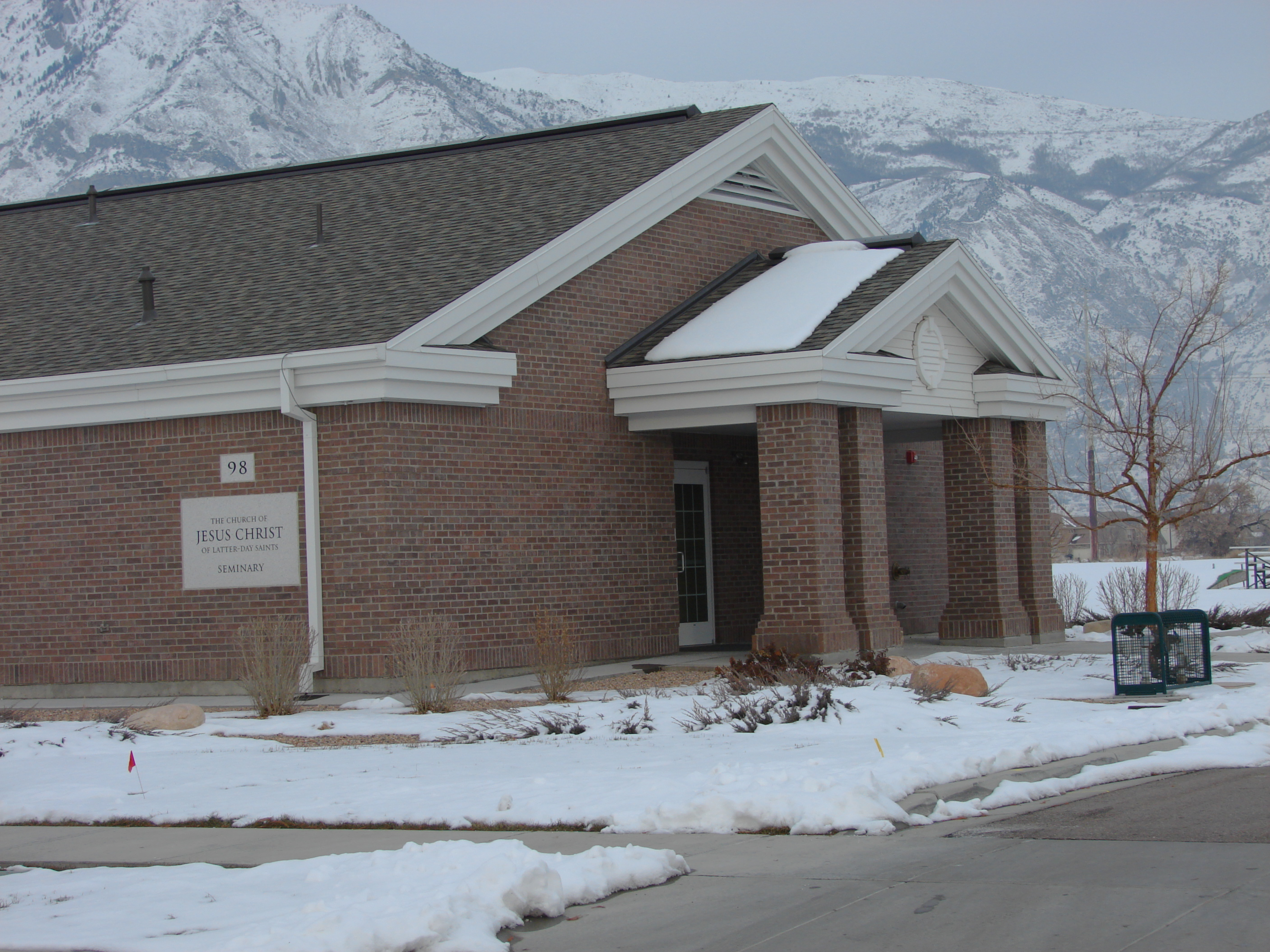
A High School Seminary at Merit Academy in Utah
