= Gadfield Elm Chapel =

Coordinates: 51°58′53″N 2°18′52″W

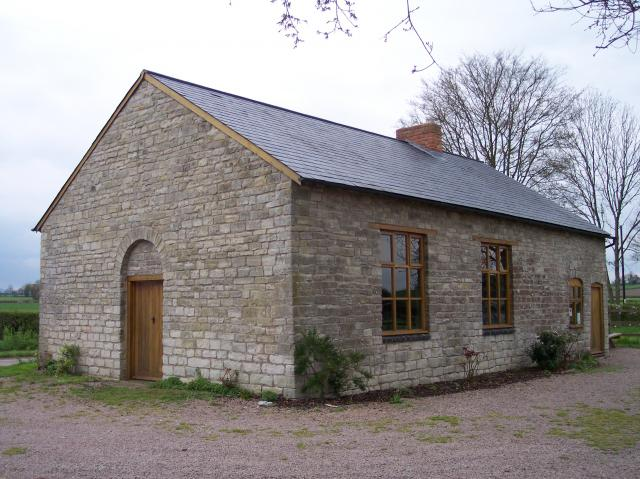
Gadfield Elm Chapel, near Pendock, Worcestershire

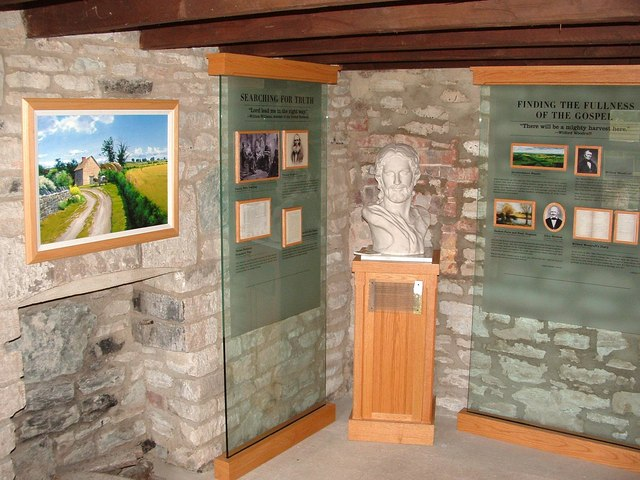
Gadfield Elm Chapel, interior

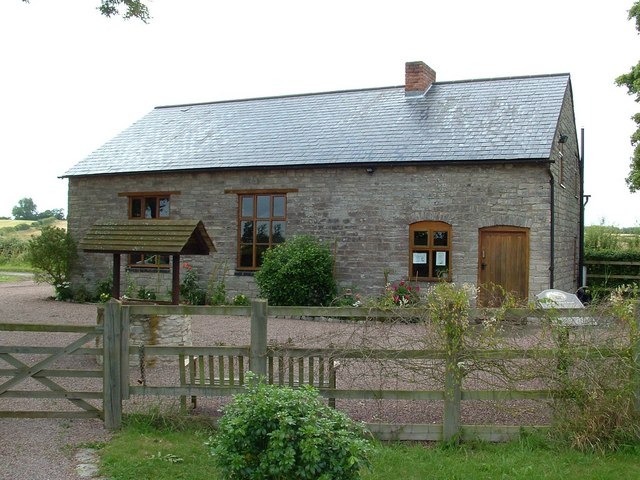
Gadfield Elm Chapel, from the picnic area

The Gadfield Elm Chapel near the village of Pendock in Worcestershire, England, is the oldest surviving chapel of the Church of Jesus Christ of Latter-day Saints (LDS Church).

== History ==
The structure was built in 1836 as a religious meeting house by the United Brethren, a group of breakaway Primitive Methodists led by Thomas Kington. In 1840 Latter Day Saint missionary and apostle Wilford Woodruff preached among the United Brethren; ultimately all but one of the 600 members converted to Mormonism. After the conversions, the structure was deeded to the Church of Jesus Christ of Latter Day Saints by Kington and John Benbow.

As a chapel of the early Latter Day Saint movement, the building was a centre of activity for the church in the Malvern Hills area. Several regional conferences of the church were held in the chapel, and Brigham Young, who at the time was President of the Quorum of the Twelve, spoke there at least once. The chapel was sold by the church in 1842 to help fund the emigration of British Latter Day Saints to America.

The building was privately owned until it was purchased in 1994 by the Gadfield Elm Trust, a group of LDS Church members interested in preserving the chapel. The Trust renovated and restored the chapel, and it was dedicated by the church apostle Jeffrey R. Holland on 23 April 2000.

In 2004 the Trust donated ownership of the chapel to the LDS Church, and it was rededicated by church president Gordon B. Hinckley on 26 May 2004. The chapel is operated as a historical tourist site by the church and admission to the public is free.
