= United Brethren (England) =

To be distinguished from the United Brethren in England

The United Brethren were a group of former Primitive Methodists in Worcestershire, Gloucestershire and Herefordshire, England, that converted en masse to the Church of Jesus Christ of Latter Day Saints in 1840.

In the mid-1830s, a group of approximately 600 Primitive Methodists led by Thomas Kington left the Primitive Methodism movement and established an independent religious organization, which they called the United Brethren. The church was divided into many small congregations scattered among the Three Counties, with 50 designated preachers for the group. In 1836, the United Brethren built the Gadfield Elm Chapel, near Ledbury.

In March 1840, Latter Day Saint missionary and apostle Wilford Woodruff was brought to Hill Farm, Fromes Hill by William Benbow, a recent English convert to Mormonism. Benbow introduced Woodruff to his brother John Benbow, who was a member of the United Brethren. Woodruff received permission to preach to United Brethren congregations, and in the first 30 days he had baptized 45 preachers and 160 members of the United Brethren into the Latter Day Saint church. By December 1840, 300 members of the church had been converted to Mormonism, and ultimately all the members of the United Brethren except one became Latter Day Saints. Woodruff and other Latter Day Saint missionaries also had success among the non-United Brethren in the area, baptizing a total of 1800 people by January 1841.

The United Brethren's Gadfield Elm Chapel was converted into a Latter Day Saint chapel, and today it is the oldest extant chapel of the Church of Jesus Christ of Latter-day Saints in the world.
