= Thomas Kington =

Thomas Kington III
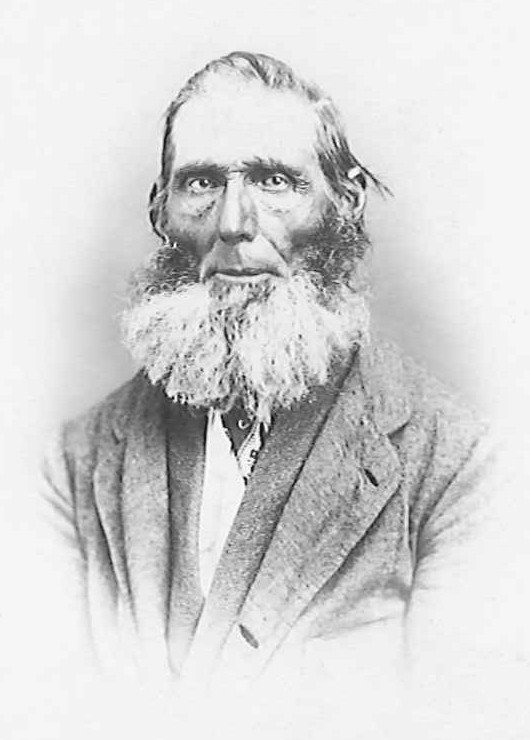
- Photograph taken in Utah Territory in 1871
- Born: 18 May 1794; Bodenham, Herefordshire, England
- Died: 1 July 1874 (aged 80); Wellsville, Cache County, Utah Territory, United States
- Spouses: Hannah Pitt and Margaret Pisel
- Parent(s): Eleanor Bowen and Thomas Kington II

Thomas Kington III (18 May 1794 – 1 July 1874) was the leader of the United Brethren in England who converted to the Church of Jesus Christ of Latter Day Saints and after emigrating to Utah Territory became a bishop and patriarch in the Church of Jesus Christ of Latter-day Saints (LDS Church). He was charged by Brigham Young to build Kington Fort in Weber County, Utah.

Thomas Kington III was born 18 May 1794 in Bodenham, Herefordshire, England, to Eleanor Bowen and Thomas Kington II. He was christened in Bodenham on 7 June 1795 in the Church of England. Kington joined the Wesleyan Methodist Church, but was expelled from that organisation when he disagreed with changes that veered away from some of Wesley's principles. Kington then joined the Primitive Methodists, but disagreements in principles caused him to be expelled from the group sometime before 1830.

After his expulsion, Kington and others of the same persuasion formed an organization called the United Brethren. Although the new organization had a different name, its structure and meeting format appears to have mirrored that of the Primitive Methodists, with both male and female officers.

In March 1840, Latter Day Saint missionary and apostle Wilford Woodruff visited the United Brethren and converted the congregation to Mormonism.

By 1853, Kington was living in Weber County, Utah. A dispute arose about the placement of a fort which had already been moved several times. Kington traveled to Salt Lake City, Utah, to ask Brigham Young to resolve the dispute. Brigham Young sent Wilford Woodruff back to Weber County with Kington. Woodruff selected a site on the south side of the Weber River. The selected site became known as Kington Fort. On 11 November 1853, a ward of the LDS Church was organized and Kington was elected bishop. Kington died in Wellsville, Cache, Utah, on 1 July 1874.
