= Staheli =

Staheli is a surname of Swiss-German origin which means "armorer." It is derived from Stahl. Notable people with the surname include:

- Don H. Staheli (born 1949), American Mormon leader and author
- Donald L. Staheli (1931–2010), American Mormon leader and business executive
- Konrad Stäheli (1866–1931), Swiss sports shooter
- Lynn Staheli (born 1933), American pediatric orthopedist
