= 600 South station =

Light rail station in Salt Lake City, Utah, United States

600 South
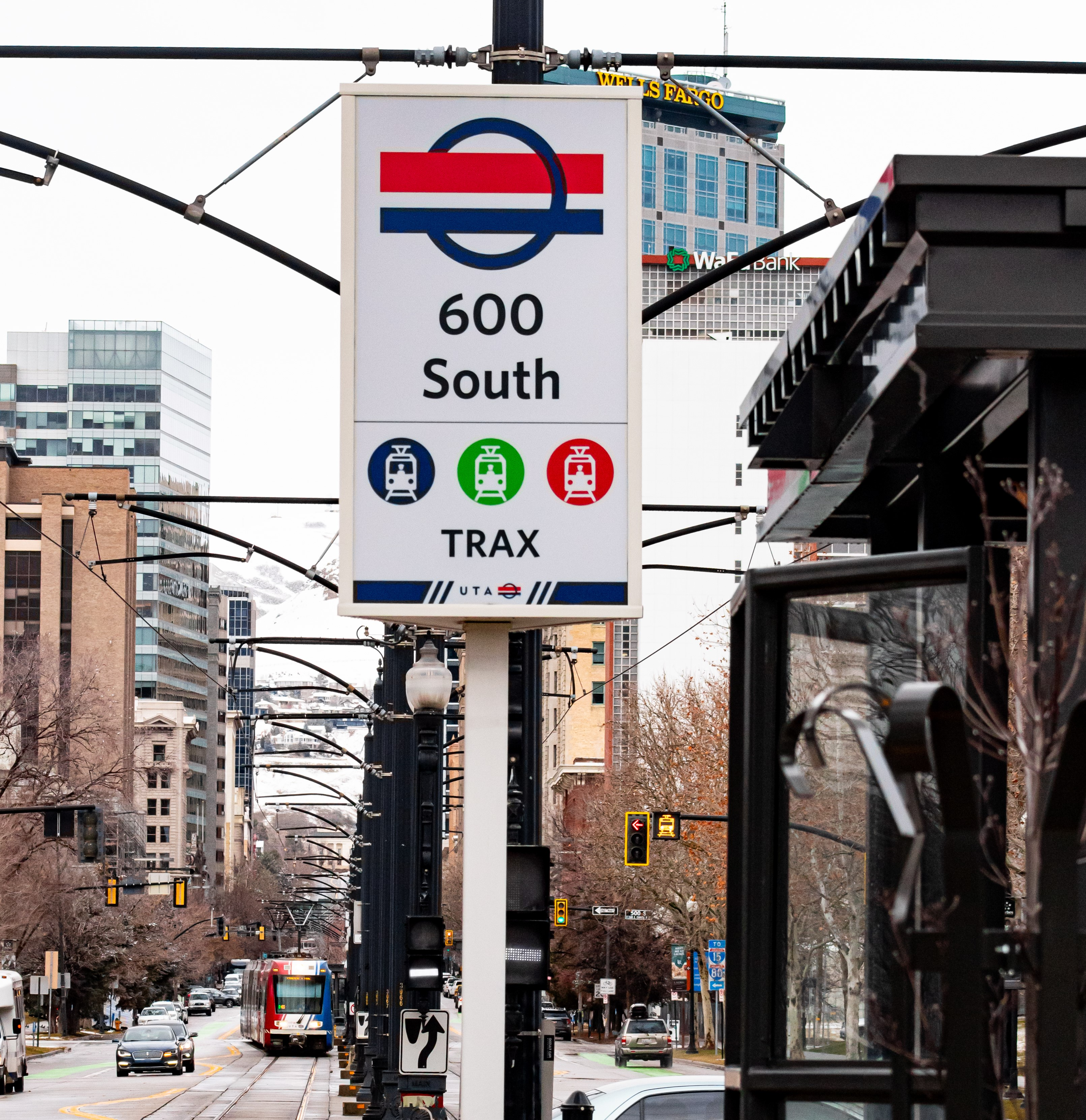

General information
- Location: 650 South Main Street; Salt Lake City, Utah; United States
- Coordinates: 40°45′19.87″N 111°53′27.95″W
- Owner: Utah Transit Authority (UTA)
- Platforms: 1 island platform
- Tracks: 2

Construction
- Structure type: At-grade
- Parking: No
- Accessible: Yes

History
- Opened: July 26, 2022; 4 years ago

Services
| Preceding station | Utah Transit Authority | Following station |
|---|---|---|
| Courthouse toward Salt Lake Central | Blue Line | 900 South toward Draper Town Center |
| Courthouse toward University Medical Center | Red Line | 900 South toward Daybreak Parkway |
| Courthouse toward Airport | Green Line | 900 South toward West Valley Central |
Location

600 South is a light rail station in Downtown Salt Lake City, Utah, United States, served by all three lines of Utah Transit Authority's TRAX light rail system. The Blue Line provides service from Downtown Salt Lake City to Draper. The Red Line provides service from the University of Utah to the Daybreak community of South Jordan. The Green Line provides service from the Salt Lake City International Airport to West Valley City (via Downtown Salt Lake City). The station opened on July 26, 2022, and is operated by the Utah Transit Authority.

== Description ==
The station is located at 650 South Main Street. The island platform, capable of serving up to four-car trains, is located in the median of Main Street between 600 South and 700 South. This station is operated by Utah Transit Authority.

== History ==
In the late 1990s, the first master plan for TRAX included plans for a station at 600 South. When the rails were first laid, planners left enough room for the eventual station. Construction began in August 2021 with plans to be completed in early 2022.

The 600 South station is the first TRAX station built since the extensions of the Blue and Green lines in 2013.

In UTA’s plan to reroute the Red Line east from Ballpark to serve the Granary District, there exists a proposed station also with the name ‘600 South.’ However, the proposed station would be located on 400 West, while the current 600 South is on Main Street.
