= 900 South station =

Light rail station in Salt Lake City, Utah, United States

900 South
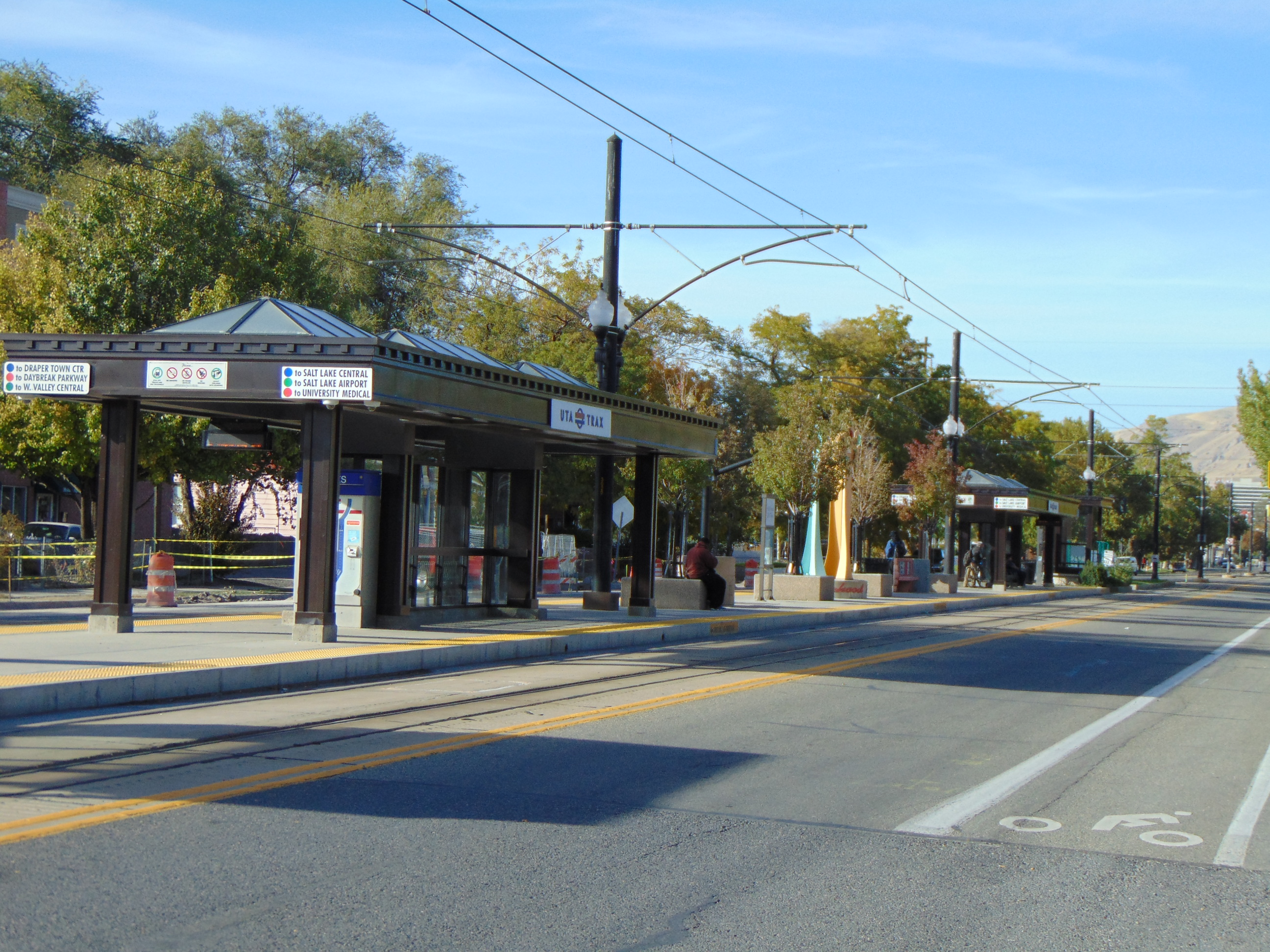
- 900 South station platform

General information
- Location: 900 South 200 West; Salt Lake City, Utah; United States
- Coordinates: 40°45′0.74″N 111°53′48.83″W
- Owner: Utah Transit Authority (UTA)
- Platforms: 1 island platform
- Tracks: 2
- Connections: UTA: 9

Construction
- Structure type: At-grade
- Accessible: Yes

History
- Opened: September 19, 2005; 21 years ago

Services
Preceding station	Utah Transit Authority	Following station
600 South toward Salt Lake Central	Blue Line	Ballpark toward Draper Town Center
600 South toward University Medical Center	Red Line	Ballpark toward Daybreak Parkway
600 South toward Airport	Green Line	Ballpark toward West Valley Central
Former services
Preceding station	Utah Transit Authority	Following station
Courthouse toward University Medical Center	Sandy/University Line	Ballpark toward Sandy Civic Center
Location

900 South is a light rail station in Downtown Salt Lake City, Utah, in the United States, served by all three lines of Utah Transit Authority's TRAX light rail system. The Blue Line provides service from Downtown Salt Lake City to Draper. The Red Line provides service from the University of Utah to the Daybreak community of South Jordan. The Green Line provides service from the Salt Lake City International Airport to West Valley City (via Downtown Salt Lake City). The station opened on September 19, 2005, and is operated by the Utah Transit Authority. 900 South is notable for being the first infill station constructed along an existing line of the TRAX system.

== Description ==
The station is located at 900 South 200 West. The island platform, capable of serving up to four-car trains, is located in the median of 200 West between 800 South and 900 South. Unlike many TRAX stations, 900 South does not have a Park and Ride lot. This station is operated by Utah Transit Authority.

As part of the UTA's Art in Transit program, 900 South features three 12-foot (3.7 m) high glass sculptures featuring the likenesses of 15 neighborhood children. Created by local artists Dan Cummings, Dinah Ihle and Kerry Transtrum, the sculptures are meant to illustrate the diversity of the people living in the neighborhood adjacent to the station. The artists also created four platform benches in the shape of clasping hands in the central portion of the platform, between the two canopies resembling the canopy at the Joseph Smith Memorial Building.

== History ==
A station at 900 South was proposed as part of the original Sandy/Salt Lake Line completed in 1999. Although no station was yet in place, by 2000 local developers began to develop high-density housing and retail uses in the vicinity of where the 900 South station was once proposed. As a result of the creation of higher-density housing in providing for a ridership base, on April 6, 2004, UTA officials announced a station at 900 South would be constructed. By November both UTA and Salt Lake City signed an agreement for the construction of the $1.2 million station to be funded through the Redevelopment Agency of Salt Lake City.

Groundbreaking for the station occurred on April 21, 2005. UTA officials announced the addition of the station would only add an additional two minutes to the existing travel time between the termini and represent the first infill station completed along the line since its opening in 1999. The station commenced service on September 19, 2005, following six months of construction.
