= Ballpark station (Utah Transit Authority) =

Light rail station in Salt Lake City, Utah, U.S.

Ballpark
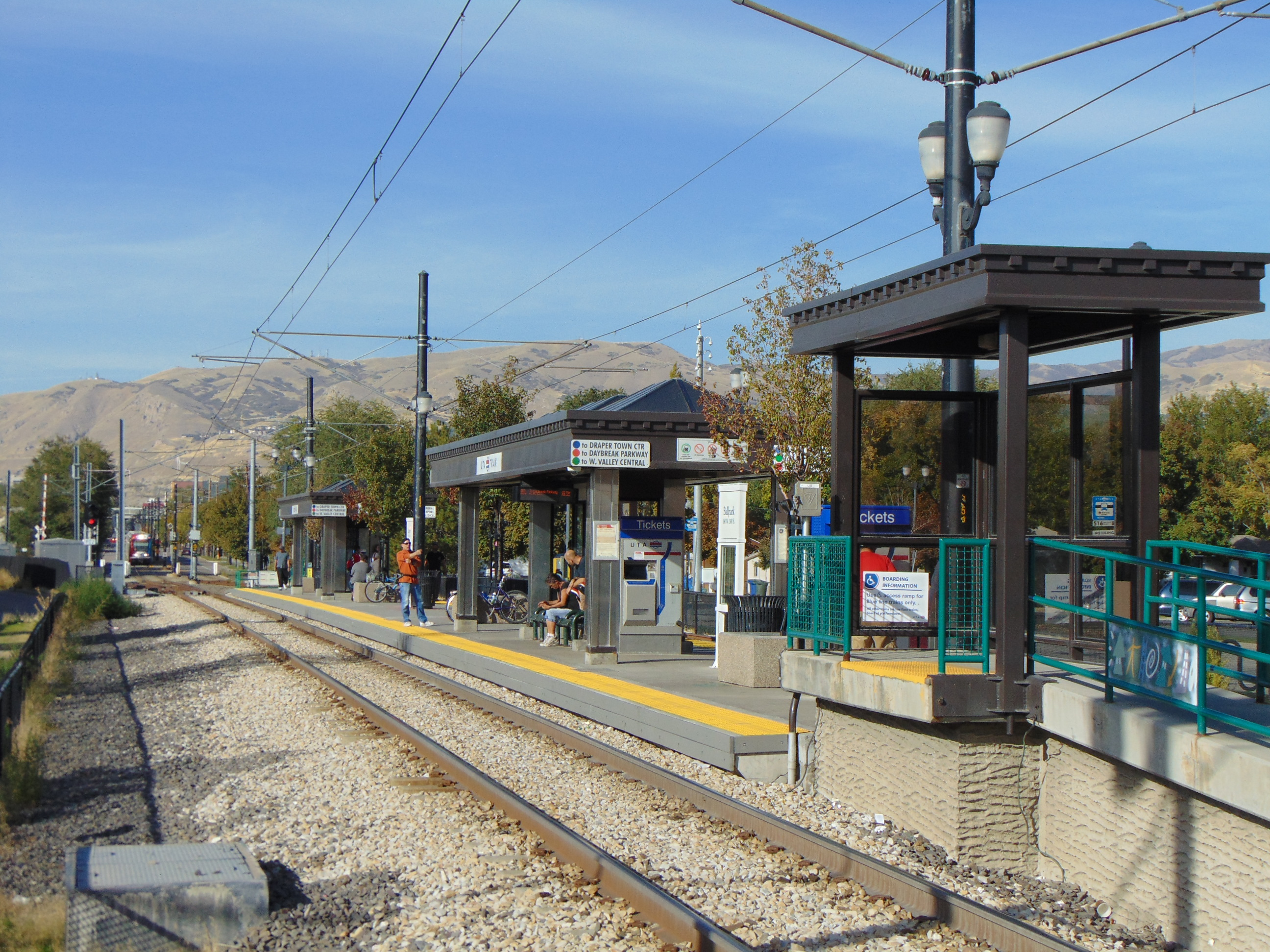
- Ballpark station platform, looking northeast in October 2016

General information
- Location: 180 West 1300 South; Salt Lake City, Utah; United States
- Coordinates: 40°44′32″N 111°53′48.5″W
- Owner: Utah Transit Authority (UTA)
- Platforms: 1 island platform
- Tracks: 3 (includes 1 non-revenue siding) (Note: The term "non-revenue" is most often used in railway terminology to refer to rail cars other than those specifically used to generate revenue (passenger cars and freight cars). However, it can also apply to railways (tracks) that are owned, but not used to transport passengers or freight. (The terms non-revenue and "deadhead" are often used interchangeably within the railroad and airline industries.) In the case of the referenced track, it is one owned by UTA and has overhead power lines for a short distance, but is not used for passenger transport.)

Construction
- Structure type: At-grade
- Parking: 170 spaces
- Cycle facilities: 3 lockers
- Accessible: Yes

History
- Opened: December 4, 1999; 26 years ago

Services
Preceding station	Utah Transit Authority	Following station
900 South toward Salt Lake Central	Blue Line	Central Pointe toward Draper Town Center
900 South toward University Medical Center	Red Line	Central Pointe toward Daybreak Parkway
900 South toward Airport	Green Line	Central Pointe toward West Valley Central
Former services
Preceding station	Utah Transit Authority	Following station
900 South toward University Medical Center	Sandy/University Line	Central Pointe toward Sandy Civic Center
Proposed services
Preceding station	Utah Transit Authority	Following station
900 South toward University Medical Center	Red Line	300 West toward Daybreak Parkway
Location

Ballpark station (Note: UTA often adds the secondary name of 1300 South on many of its maps and other references. The station is sometimes referred to as "Ball Park" (two words) instead of the correct name "Ballpark" (one word), even by UTA itself. The original official and legal name selected by UTA was "Ballpark" and that is the name still used by UTA on its list of TRAX station names, its Salt Lake County System Map, TRAX schedules, bus route maps, and the signage on the station itself. However, the UTA does mistakenly list it as "Ball Park" on its TRAX & FrontRunner Map, TRAX Map, and all three individual maps of TRAX lines) is a light rail station in the People's Freeway neighborhood of Salt Lake City, Utah, in the United States, served by all three lines of Utah Transit Authority's TRAX light rail system. The Blue Line provides service from Downtown Salt Lake City to Draper. The Red Line provides service from the University of Utah to the Daybreak community of South Jordan. The Green Line provides service from the Salt Lake City International Airport to West Valley City (via Downtown Salt Lake City).

== Description ==
The station is located at 180 West 1300 South (1300 South is a major east–west route through Salt Lake City and the station is easily accessed from that street). It is about a half a block northwest of the Smith's Ballpark, home to the Salt Lake Bees. Two driveways from 1300 South allow access to the station by vehicles and buses from the south side of the station. Sidewalks on 1300 South and Lucy Lane to the north allow pedestrian and bicycle access. There is direct access to the platform from the sidewalk on the north side of 1300 South. The 1300 South cross street provides direct access to the major north–south arterial roads—West Temple Street, Main Street and State Street (US 89) to the east and 300 West and Interstate 15/80 to the west. The station has a Park and Ride lot with 170 free parking spaces available. There is also a dedicated parking space is allocated to U Car Share, a carsharing company operating in Salt Lake City. The station was opened on December 4, 1999 and is operated by the Utah Transit Authority.

== History ==
Ballpark is near the point where the Salt Lake and Utah interurban streetcar line crossed the first mainline built south from Salt Lake City (which has been known by many names, but is most associated with the Union Pacific Railroad). The TRAX tracks north of the station follow the old route of the Salt Lake and Utah, while the tracks south of the area follow those used by Union Pacific. The electrified spur track visible to the northwest of the current station is the northern continuation of the original Union Pacific mainline; only a few traces of the southern continuation of the Salt Lake and Utah line (which headed due southwest to the vicinity of UTA's Redwood Junction station before turning south) remain.

In 1997, when planning for the rebuilt Sandy/Salt Lake line, UTA had envisioned that the area around the station would go through an urban renewal, with some of the older houses renovated and new multi-family living constructed around the station. However, UTA property manager Richard Swenson admitted that, "I don't think developers have caught the vision yet." The station was part of the original TRAX line (now the Blue Line), which opened December 4, 1999. Students from the nearby Horizonte Instruction and Training Center painted a mural along the side of one of the businesses that are located along the west side of the station in 2000, which were frequent targets for graffiti artists. A Salt Lake City official stated that these murals help keep down graffiti because "...the gangs for some reason respect that kind of artwork."

The Park and Ride lot was filled to capacity on most nights during the 2002 Winter Olympics due to the high use of TRAX and buses by locals and spectators. In 2003, Ballpark had the third highest auto-theft numbers out of all TRAX stations, behind Historic Sandy and Sandy Civic Center. On October 31, 2006, then-governor Jon Huntsman, Jr. held a press conference at the station to support Proposition 3, which instituted a quarter-cent raise in the state's sales tax in Salt Lake and Utah counties. Proposition 3 included funding for FrontRunner and, at the time, 33 unknown projects in Salt Lake County.

== Services ==
The single island platform, capable of serving up to four-car trains, is located on the west side of the 3.2-acre (1.3 ha) property. Two shelters are located on the platform covering small seating areas, with pictures of former Salt Lake Bees players lining the inside canopy.

On August 18, 2009, U Car Share started providing carsharing services with public pick up and drop off stops at several different TRAX stations as well as the University of Utah campus. Three secured bicycle lockers are also located on the facility, but must be rented from UTA in advance for an annual fee. Three ticket machines are located on the platform that provide single-ride, round trip, and all day passes, as well as family and discounted fare tickets. The ticket machines are cash-only and provide change in dollar coins and quarters only. TRAX ticket machines used to accept UTA fare tokens, which are still accepted on buses. On September 1, 2008 UTA discontinued the use of tokens at TRAX machines due to increased fraud.
