= Draper Utah Temple =

Latter-day Saints temple in Draper, Utah, United States

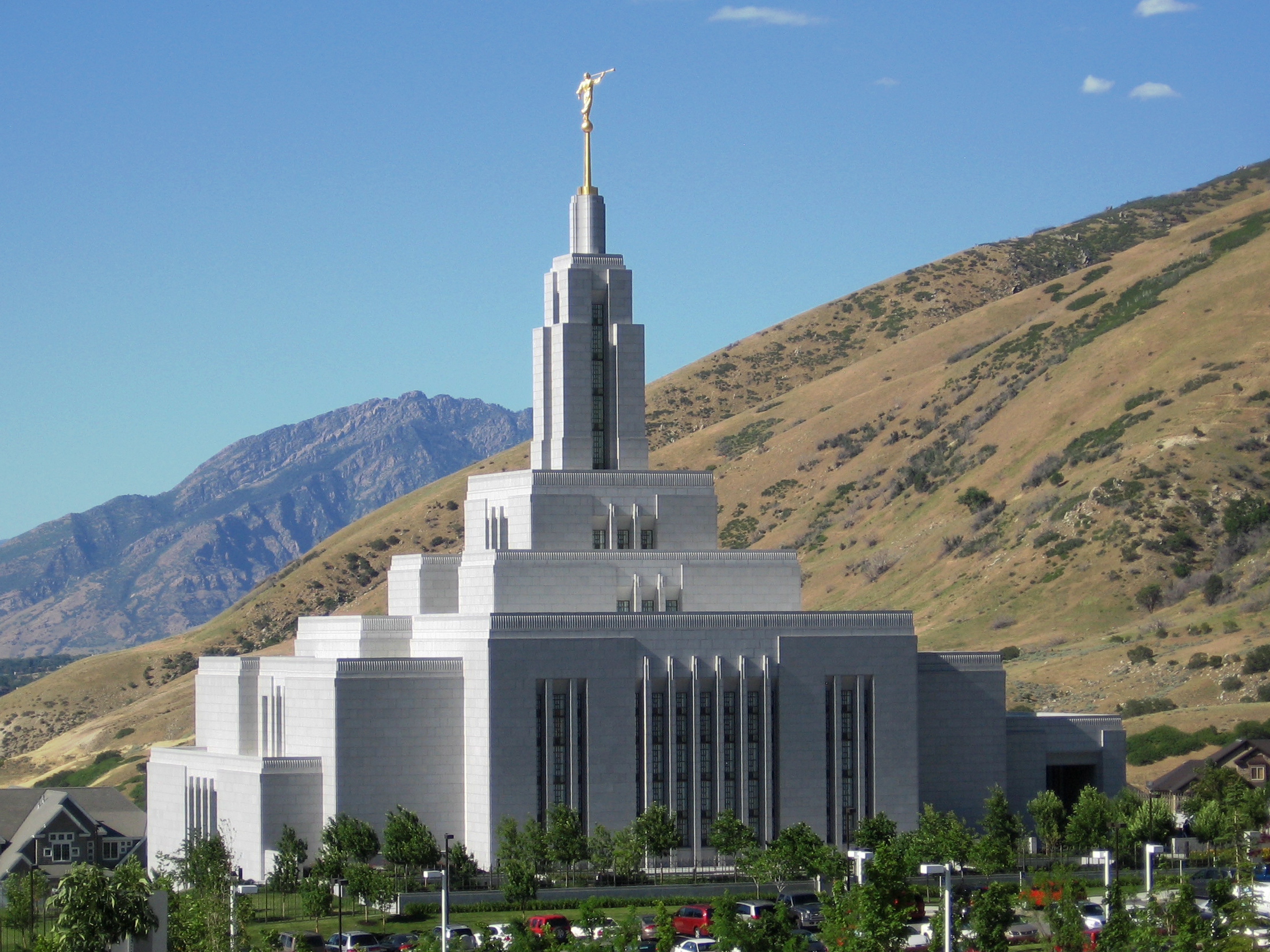
- Interactive map of Draper Utah Temple
- Number: 129
- Dedication: March 20, 2009, by Thomas S. Monson
- Site: 12 acres (4.9 ha)
- Floor area: 58,300 ft^{2} (5,420 m^{2})
- Height: 168.67 ft (51.41 m)
- Official website • News & images

Church chronology
← Twin Falls Idaho Temple	Draper Utah Temple	→ Oquirrh Mountain Utah Temple

Additional information
- Announced: October 2, 2004, by Gordon B. Hinckley
- Groundbreaking: August 5, 2006, by Gordon B. Hinckley
- Open house: January 15 – March 14, 2009
- Current president: Dirk A. Cotterell
- Designed by: FFKR Architects
- Location: Draper, Utah, U.S.
- Coordinates: 40°29′43.91880″N 111°50′25.94760″W
- Exterior finish: White granite
- Baptistries: 1
- Ordinance rooms: 4 (two-stage progressive)
- Sealing rooms: 5
- Clothing rental: Yes
- Notes: The 12th temple dedicated in Utah, the Draper Utah Temple has been operating since March 2009.

The Draper Utah Temple is the 129th temple of the Church of Jesus Christ of Latter-day Saints. It was dedicated by church president Thomas S. Monson on March 20, 2009, with additional sessions also held through March 22. The intent to build the temple was announced by church president Gordon B. Hinckley on October 2, 2004, during the church's general conference. Prior to the dedication, the temple was open to the public from January 15, 2009 through March 14, 2009.

The temple was designed by FFKR Architects, using a modern style. A groundbreaking ceremony, to signify the beginning of construction, was held on August 5, 2006, conducted by Hinckley.

== History ==
Church president Gordon B. Hinckley announced the intent to construct the temple during the opening session of the October 2004 general conference. Hinckley said the new building was needed to relieve overcrowding in other temples in the valley. It was the fourth temple built in the Salt Lake Valley (after the Salt Lake, Jordan River, and Oquirrh Mountain temples).

=== Location and structure ===
The Draper Utah Temple sits on 12 acres (49,000 m^{2}) at 2000 East and 14000 South in Draper, Utah. The 57,000-square-foot (5,300 m^{2}) temple is 166 feet (51 m) high from the main level to the top of the structure's spire, which includes the angel Moroni statue that had historically been included on most Latter-day Saint temples. The location near the mouth of Draper's Corner Canyon includes a Latter-day Saint meetinghouse. The temple sits above 1,000 acres (400 ha; 1.6 sq mi) of open space in the canyon below that the city approved in fall of 2005. Many varieties of trees surround the temple and line the 492 parking spots.

=== Groundbreaking ===
The temple groundbreaking occurred during an invitation-only ceremony at the site, and which was broadcast on the church's satellite system to nearby stake centers. The ceremony was conducted by Russell M. Nelson of the church's Quorum of the Twelve Apostles, with all members of the First Presidency in attendance.

=== Open house and dedication ===
On November 29, 2008, the church announced that the temple would be open to the public for tours beginning January 15, 2009. Reservations for tours were available until March 14, 2009.

The temple was dedicated during 12 sessions from March 20–22 by Thomas S. Monson.

In 2020, like all the church's other temples, the Draper Utah Temple was closed in response to the coronavirus pandemic.

== Design and architecture ==
The building has a modern style, coupled with a traditional Latter-day Saint temple design. Designed by FFKR Architects, the temple's architecture reflects both the cultural heritage of the Draper region and its spiritual significance to the church.

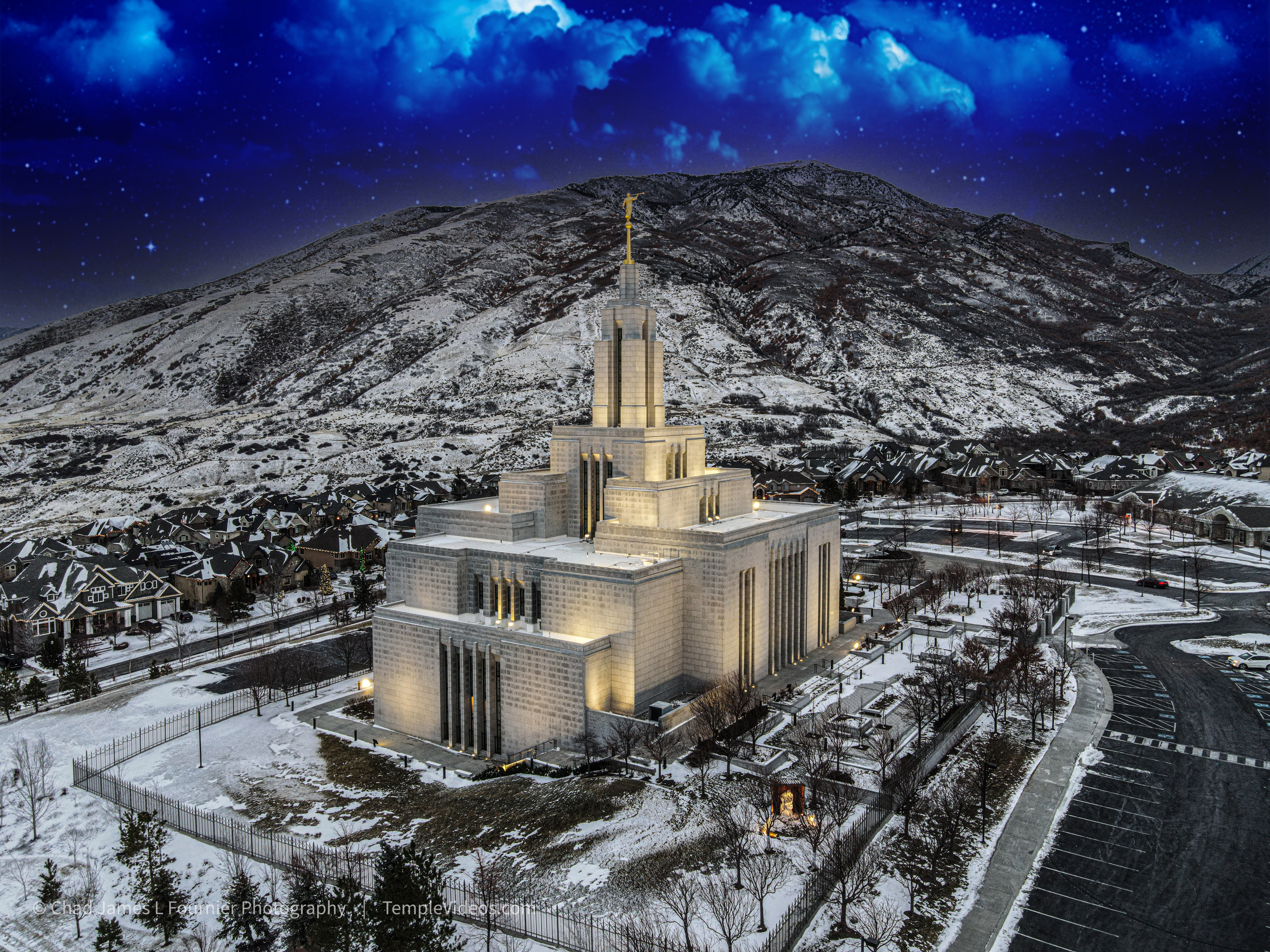
Draper Utah Temple

=== Exterior ===
The 57,000-square-foot (5,300 m^{2}) temple is 166 feet (51 m) high from the main level to the top of the structure's spire, which includes the angel Moroni statue. The exterior also includes art glass windows. These elements were chosen for their symbolic significance and alignment with temple traditions.

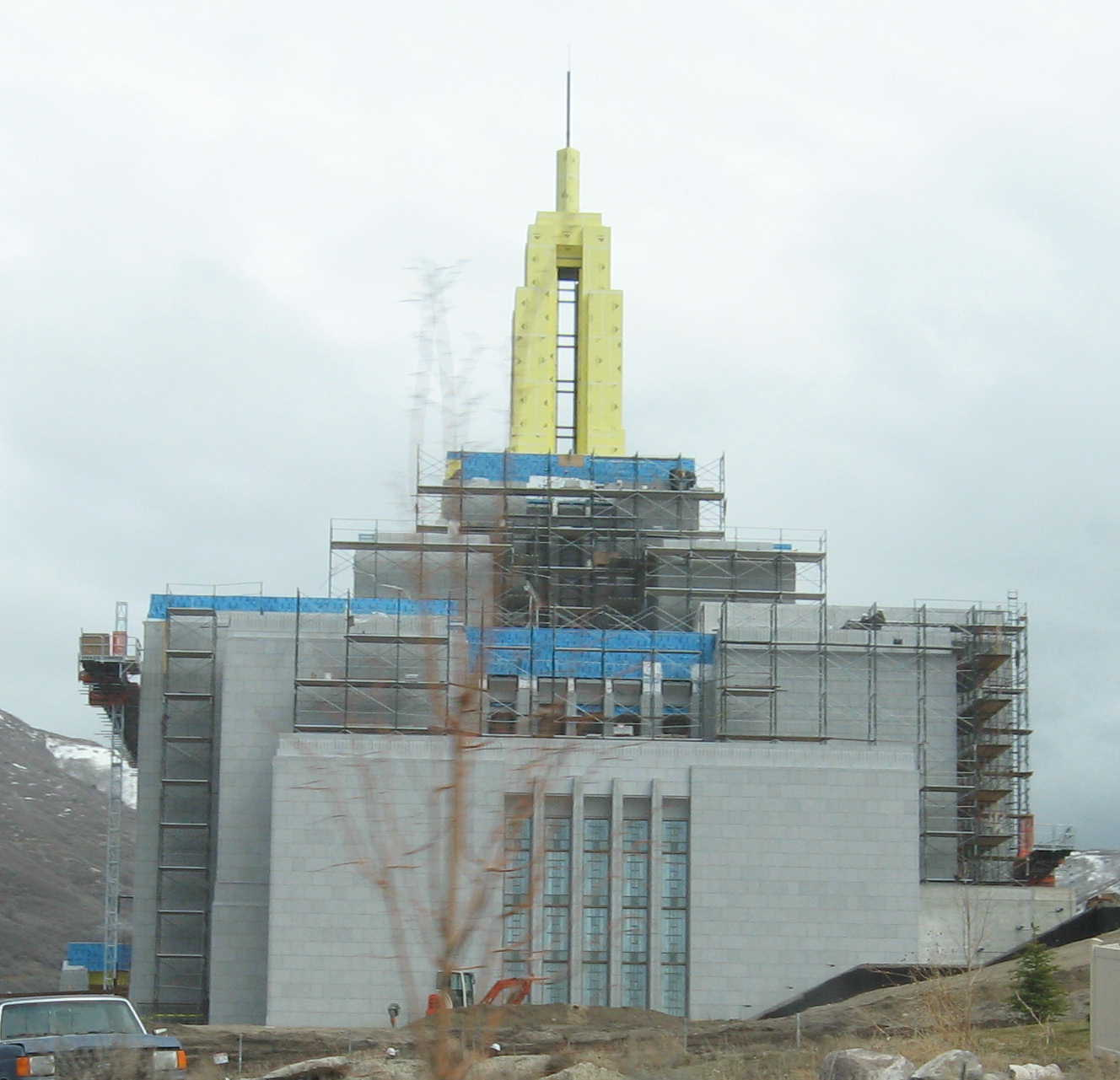
The Draper Utah Temple under construction in March 2008

=== Interior ===
The interior features limestone from France, African makore wood, and art-glass windows. The interior is also decorated with unique artwork, such as murals of the Rocky Mountains in the instruction rooms, and “a 1922 oil painting that used to hang in the former Draper Tabernacle.” The temple has a radial design centered around the celestial room, which is designed to create a spiritually uplifting environment. The temple includes four instruction rooms, five sealing rooms, and one baptistry, each arranged for ceremonial use.

=== Symbols ===
The design has elements representing Latter-day Saint symbolism, providing deeper spiritual to the temple's appearance and function. Symbolism is important to church members and include the interior design’s motif of the sego lily, which is Utah’s state flower. The sego lily has been said to represent many things, including Utah’s “pioneer spirit.”

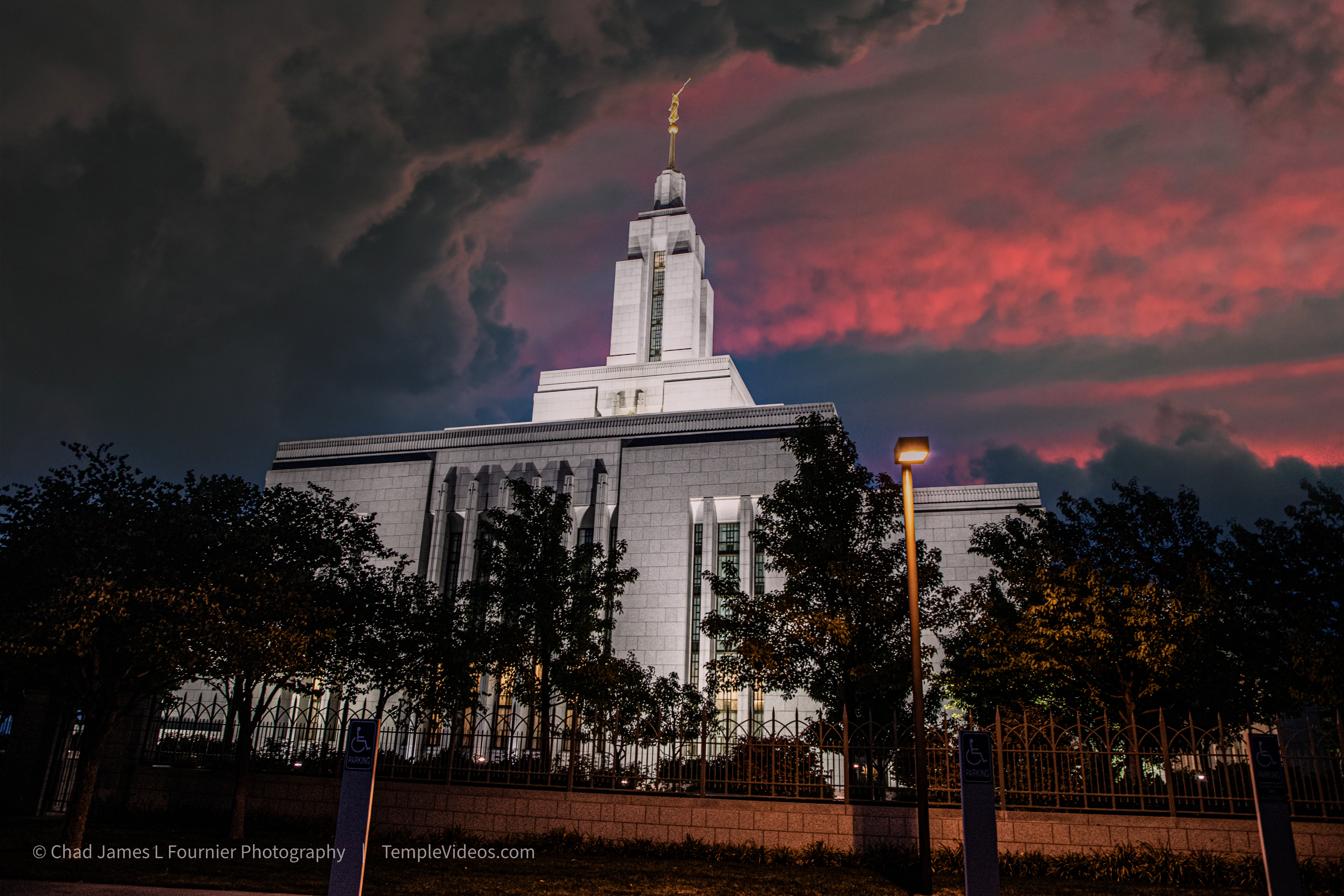
Draper Utah Temple

== Temple presidents ==
The church's temples are directed by a temple president and matron, each typically serving for a term of three years. The president and matron oversee the administration of temple operations and provide guidance and training for both temple patrons and staff.

The first president of the Draper Utah Temple was Donald L. Staheli, a former church general authority, with the matron being Afton S. Staheli. They served from 2009 until his death in 2010. As of 2024, Dirk A. Cotterell is the president, with Lilly Ann Cotterell serving as matron.

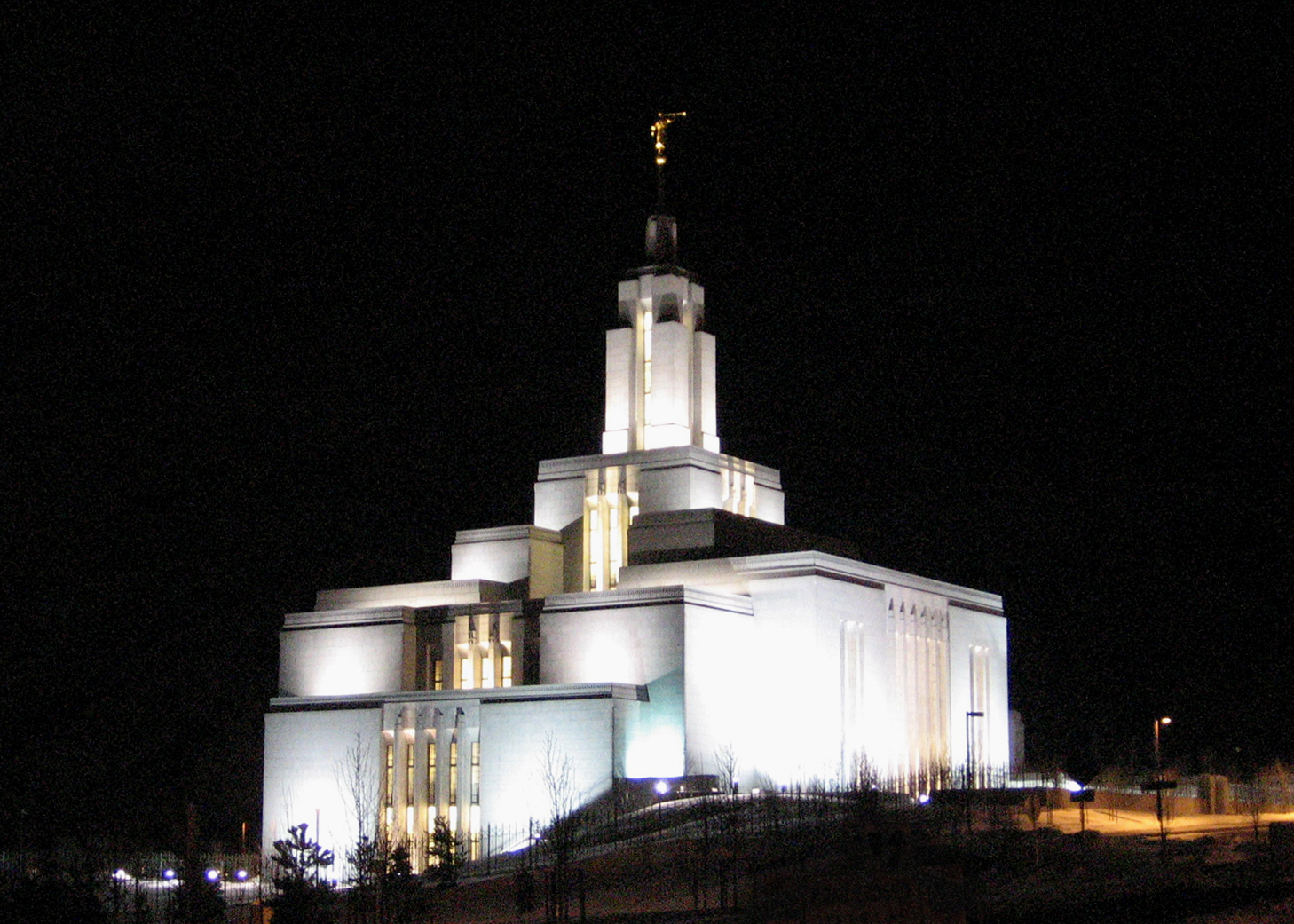
A night view during the open house

== Admittance ==
On September 30, 2008, the church announced that a public open house would be held from January 15, 2009 – March 14, 2009 (excluding Sundays). The temple was dedicated by Thomas S. Monson in 12 sessions, beginning on March 20 and running through the 22nd, 2009. Like all the church's temples, it is not used for Sunday worship services. To members of the church, temples are regarded as sacred houses of the Lord. Once dedicated, only church members with a current temple recommend can enter for worship.

== See also ==
Temples in Utah
Wasatch Front Temples
Temples along the Wasatch Front
- = Operating
- = Under construction
- = Announced
- = Temporarily Closed

- The Church of Jesus Christ of Latter-day Saints in Utah
- Comparison of temples of The Church of Jesus Christ of Latter-day Saints
- List of temples of The Church of Jesus Christ of Latter-day Saints
- List of temples of The Church of Jesus Christ of Latter-day Saints by geographic region
- Temple architecture (Latter-day Saints)
