= Global HELP Organization =

American healthcare nonprofit

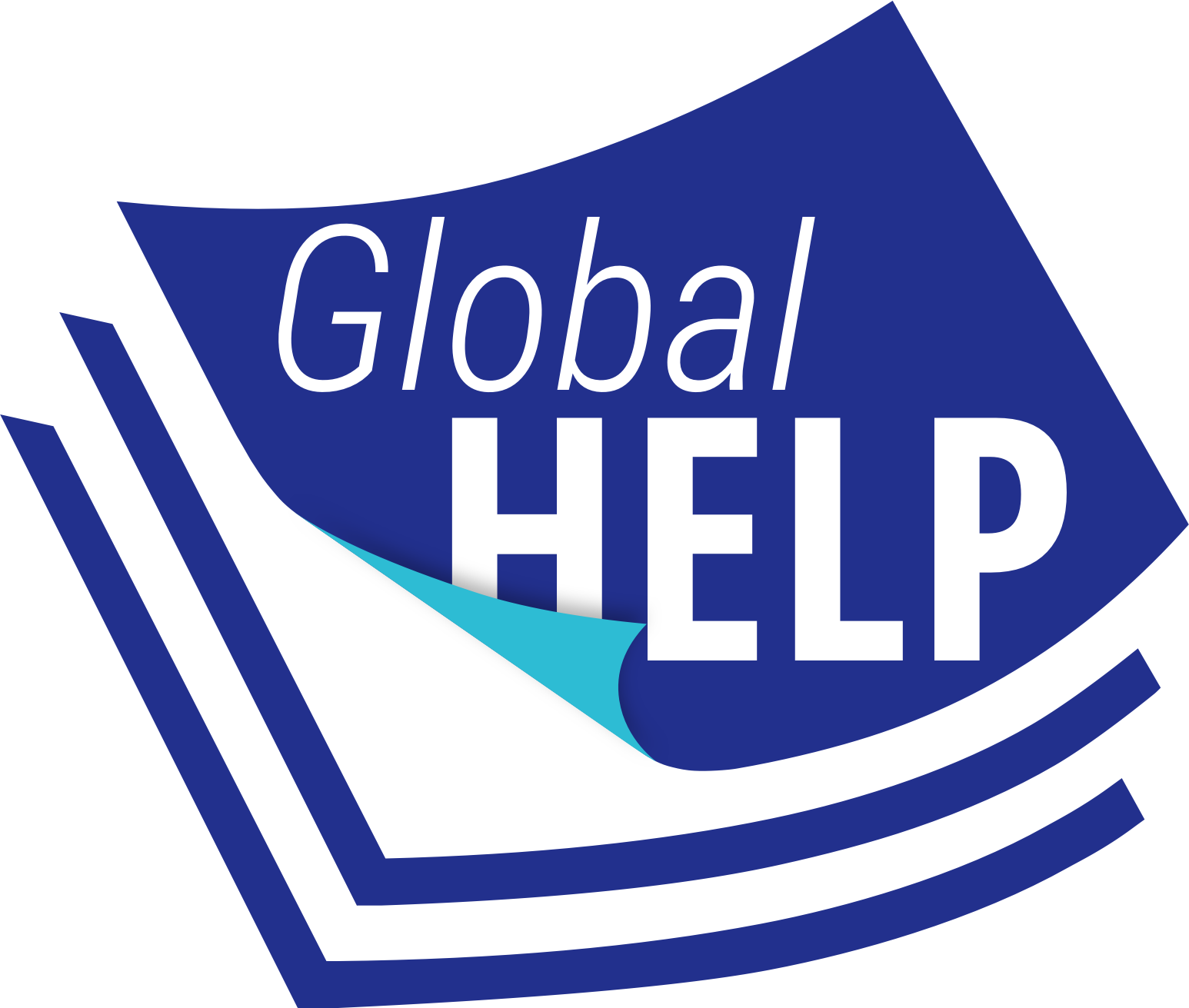
- Founded: 2002
- Founder: Lynn Staheli; Lana Staheli
- Type: GHO provides free and relevant healthcare information worldwide United States IRS exemption status: 501(c)(3)
- Location: Seattle, United States of America
- Board of directors: Lynn Staheli; Lana Staheli; Paul Merriman; Cora Breuner; Merideth Tall
- Key people: Dalia Sepúlveda
- Website: global-help.org

Global HELP Organization (GHO) is a 501(c)(3) nonprofit organization working in the area of creating and distributing healthcare information for low-resource areas. HELP stands for "Health Education using Low-cost Publications". Founded in 2002 by pediatric orthopedist Lana and Lynn Staheli, GHO distributes information in the form of PDFs and videos online and through DVD libraries.

== Publications ==
GHO has created 85 titles in 35 languages.

=== Clubfoot: Ponseti Management ===
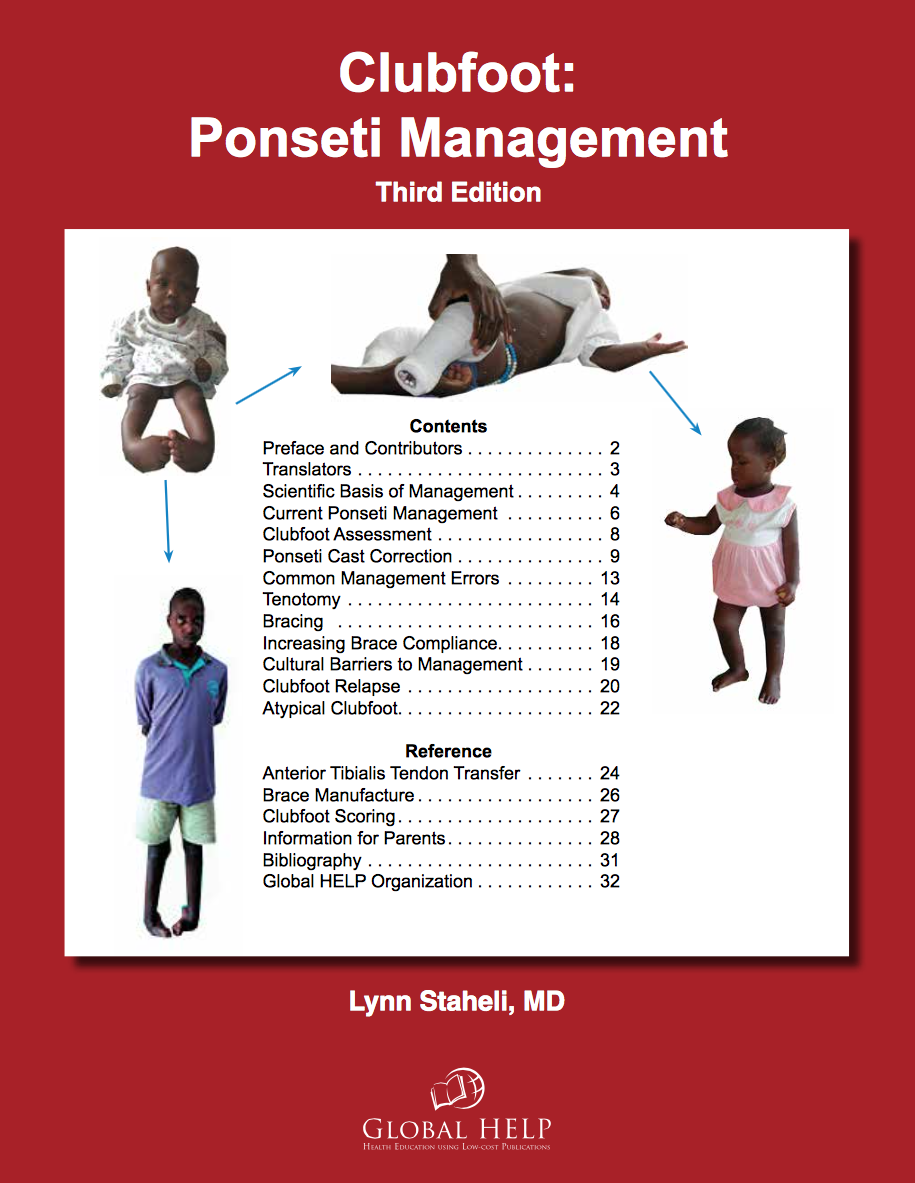
Clubfoot: Ponseti Management cover

Clubfoot: Ponseti Management is a guide written and published by GHO on the Ponseti method of treating clubfoot. Originally published in 2003, the guide has been translated into 30 languages and the PDF has been downloaded over 100,000 times in 150 countries. It was also included in the World Health Organization Blue Trunk Library.

=== The HELP Guide to Cerebral Palsy ===
The HELP Guide to Cerebral Palsy provides an overview of diagnosis and management techniques for cerebral palsy. The second edition was published by GHO in 2010.

=== Paediatric Surgery: A Comprehensive Text for Africa ===
Edited by Dr. Emmanuel Ameh, Paediatric Surgery: A Comprehensive Text for Africa was published by GHO in 2010 and includes chapters from 150 contributors. The focus of the two-volume book is on pediatric surgical problems in Africa and other low-resource areas around the world. 1,000 hard copies were printed and distributed throughout Africa in 2010 and the PDF version has been downloaded over 250,000 times from the GHO website.

=== The HELP Guide to Burn Contractures in Developing Countries ===
Written in 2010, The HELP Guide to Burn Contractures in Developing Countries discusses methods of burn treatment in underserved regions.

== Videos ==
GHO has 144 videos available on their YouTube channel.

== Users ==
Nearly 38% of GHO's online user community resides in India. The United Kingdom, Russia, Pakistan, and New Zealand also rank in the top five countries that access materials on global-help.org.
