= Paradigm High School =

Location
- 11577 South 3600 West, South Jordan, Utah; United States; 40.5410°N 111.9758°W

Information
- Type: Charter school
- Motto: "Learn how to think not what to think."
- Established: 2006
- School district: Utah Charter Schools District
- Dean: Fernando Seminario
- Principal: Fernando Seminario
- Staff: 21.07 (FTE)
- Grades: 6-12
- Enrollment: 361 (2024-2025)
- Student to teacher ratio: 17.13
- Colors: Red, white and blue
- Athletics: Basketball, soccer, volleyball, flag football, softball, taekwondo
- Mascot: Patriots
- Affiliation: Utah State Office of Education
- Website: Official website

Paradigm Charter Schools is a charter school in South Jordan, Utah, United States that serves grades 6-12.

== History ==
Paradigm was organized as a charter school under the Utah State Department of Education. It received its charter on July 13, 2005, and opened in September 2006.

== Academic performance ==
2 years ago The Utah State Board Of Education gave Paradigm High School an F grade (based on a 38% proficiency on the SAGE test) for its performance in the 2015-2016 school year. These rankings are based primarily on the SAGE test scores. Coincidentally, Paradigm also has one of the highest opt out rates for the SAGE test at 54% testing in the state.

Due to the high SAGE opt-out rate by parents, Paradigm uses the ACT for internal performance tracking. The school has administered the ACT to all High School grades twice per year since the 2014/2015 school year. For those years, the student ACT opt out rate has been below 5% and average ACT scores have been equal to or slightly better than state averages.

== Ethnic diversity ==
As of the 2016-2017 school year, Paradigm High is in the bottom 1/3 of schools for ethnic diversity.

== Courses ==
Paradigm offers a variety of courses in addition to standard courses, such as Novel Writing, AP Environmental Science, and taekwondo. Among its wide variety of English courses are one on the writings of C.S. Lewis, and classes about Western and Eastern World, French, Gothic, and British (including Shakespeare) literature. It also offers Latin, German, Spanish and Chinese.

== Athletics ==
Starting in 2021-2022 Paradigm joined the USSA (Utah Schools Sports Association) from which boys and girls can compete in Volleyball, Cross Country, Basketball and Soccer. The Boys Volleyball team also competes in the Spring League playing other top high schools in Salt Lake County.

Paradigm offers Standard PE classes, including Fitness, as well as Dance and Yoga.

== Extracurricular activities ==
Paradigm has many extracurricular activities and competitive teams. The Paradigm Chess Team (PCT) took third in the 1A-3A division in the Utah High School Chess Championships two consecutive seasons.

Paradigm also supports an excellent Academic Decathlon team. In March 2011, they beat reigning state champions Park City High in Super Quiz, one of 10 categories, and the most competitive, by 5 points out of a possible 6,000.
