= Oquirrh Mountain Utah Temple =

Latter-day Saints temple in South Jordan, Utah, United States

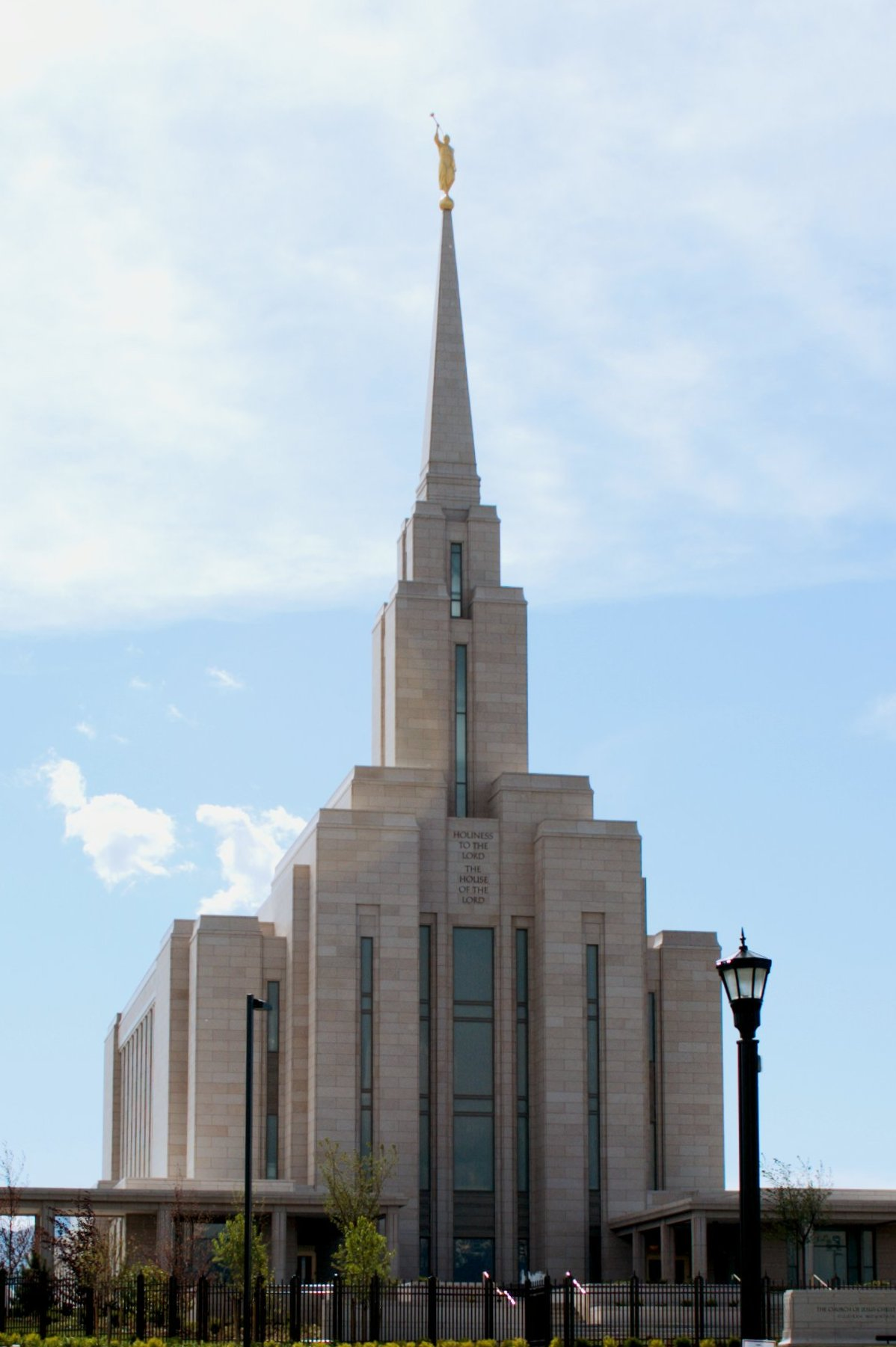
- Oquirrh Mountain Utah Temple in May 2009.
- Interactive map of Oquirrh Mountain Utah Temple
- Number: 130
- Dedication: August 21, 2009, by Thomas S. Monson
- Site: 11 acres (4.5 ha)
- Floor area: 60,000 ft^{2} (5,600 m^{2})
- Height: 183 ft (56 m)
- Official website • News & images

Church chronology
← Draper Utah Temple	Oquirrh Mountain Utah Temple	→ Vancouver British Columbia Temple

Additional information
- Announced: October 1, 2005, by Gordon B. Hinckley
- Groundbreaking: December 16, 2006, by Gordon B. Hinckley
- Open house: June 1, 2009 to August 1, 2009
- Current president: Michael C. Cannon
- Designed by: Naylor Wentworth
- Location: South Jordan, Utah, United States
- Coordinates: 40°33′4.121999″N 111°59′15.03600″W
- Exterior finish: Light beige granite
- Baptistries: 1
- Ordinance rooms: 4 (two-stage progressive)
- Sealing rooms: 6
- Notes: 13th temple in Utah and 130th temple of the Church.

The Oquirrh Mountain Utah Temple /ˈoʊkər/ is a temple of the Church of Jesus Christ of Latter-day Saints located in South Jordan, Utah, a suburb of Salt Lake City. The intent to build the temple was announced on October 1, 2005, by church president Gordon B. Hinckley, during general conference. South Jordan was the world's first city with two church temples (with the Jordan River Temple). The temple was the fourth in the Salt Lake Valley and the 13th in Utah.

When completed in 2009, the Oquirrh Mountain Utah Temple served approximately 83,000 Latter-day Saints living in the western Salt Lake Valley. The building is faced with light beige granite quarried and milled from China and features a single attached end spire with a statue of the angel Moroni. The temple was designed by Naylor Wentworth Lund Architects of Salt Lake City, Utah. A groundbreaking ceremony, to signify the beginning of construction, was held on December 16, 2006, conducted by Hinckley.

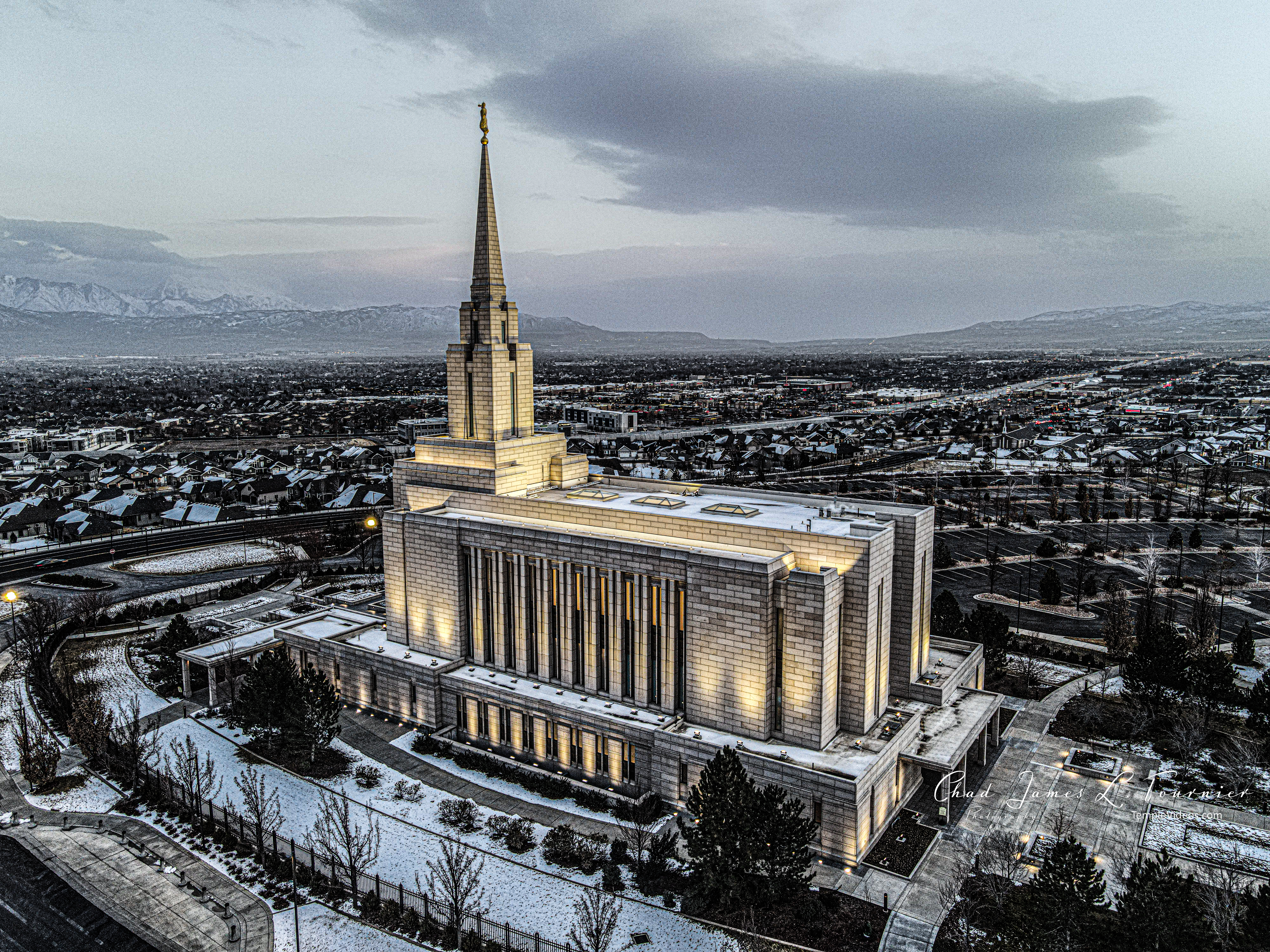
Oquirrh Mountain Utah Temple

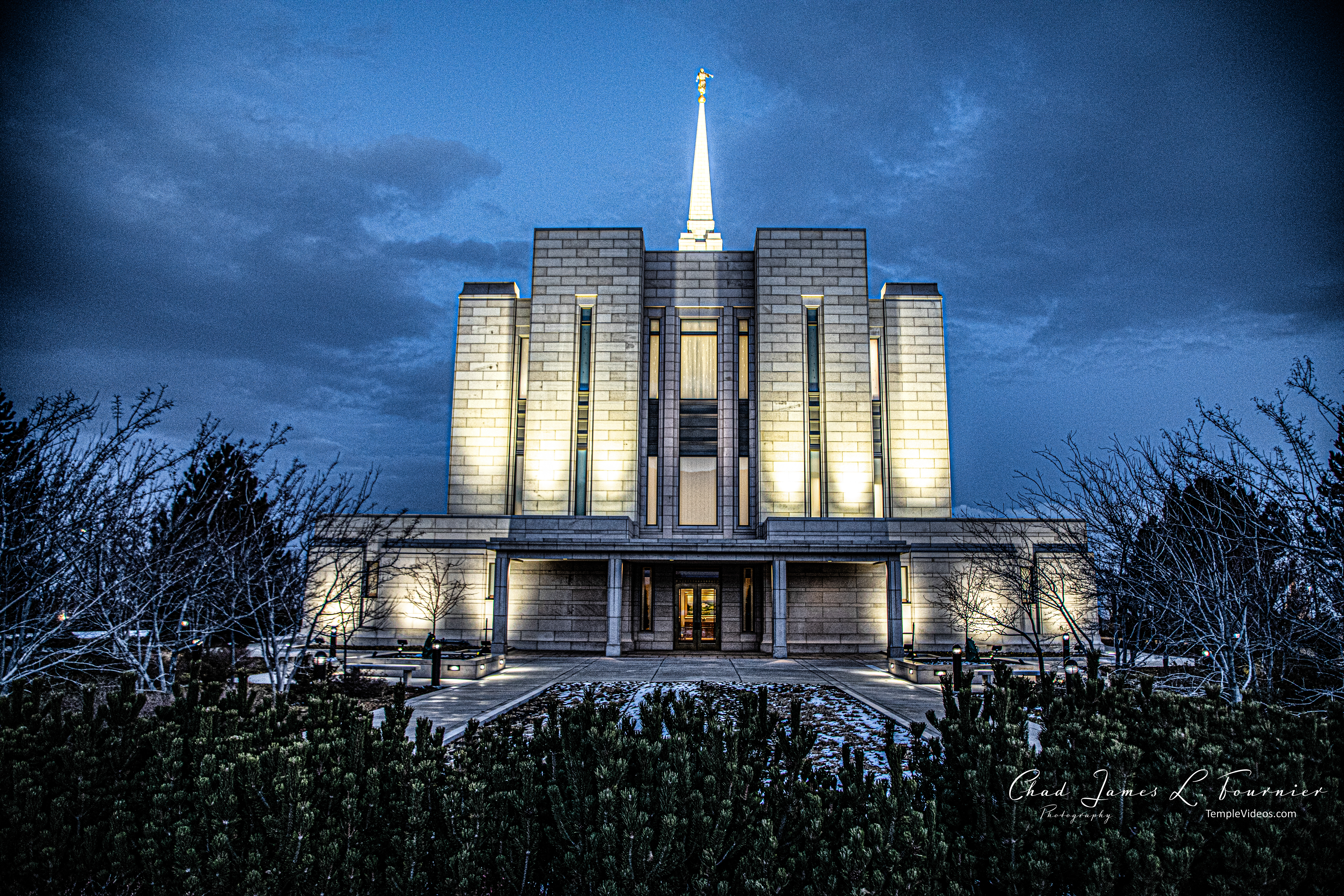
Oquirrh Mountain Utah Temple

== History ==
The Oquirrh Mountain Utah Temple was built on a bluff on the edge of the Daybreak Community. The property was donated to the church by Kennecott Land, a portion of a company that mines copper and precious minerals from the Oquirrh Mountains, a few miles west of the temple. The building features a single stone spire 193 feet (59 m) high, topped by a 9-foot (2.7 m) statue of the angel Moroni. Ground was broken for construction by church president Gordon B. Hinckley on December 16, 2006. After originally being known as the "South Jordan Utah Temple," an update to become the "Oquirrh Mountain Utah Temple" was announced at the groundbreaking.

The temple was named after the nearby mountain range. The church website says that the term "oquirrh" comes from the Goshute tribe, and when translated means "shining mountains" or "wooded mountain." The temple was designed by Naylor Wentworth Lund Architects.

After construction was completed, but prior to beginning a public open house, media were invited to tour the temple in May 2009. Quentin L. Cook, of the church's Quorum of the Twelve Apostles, expressed hope that people of all backgrounds would visit the open house to learn there is nothing "secret" about the temple as people understand the work (ordinances) performed there. The public open house was held from June 1 to August 1, 2009, during which there were almost 590,000 visitors to the temple, including more than 100,000 in its last week.

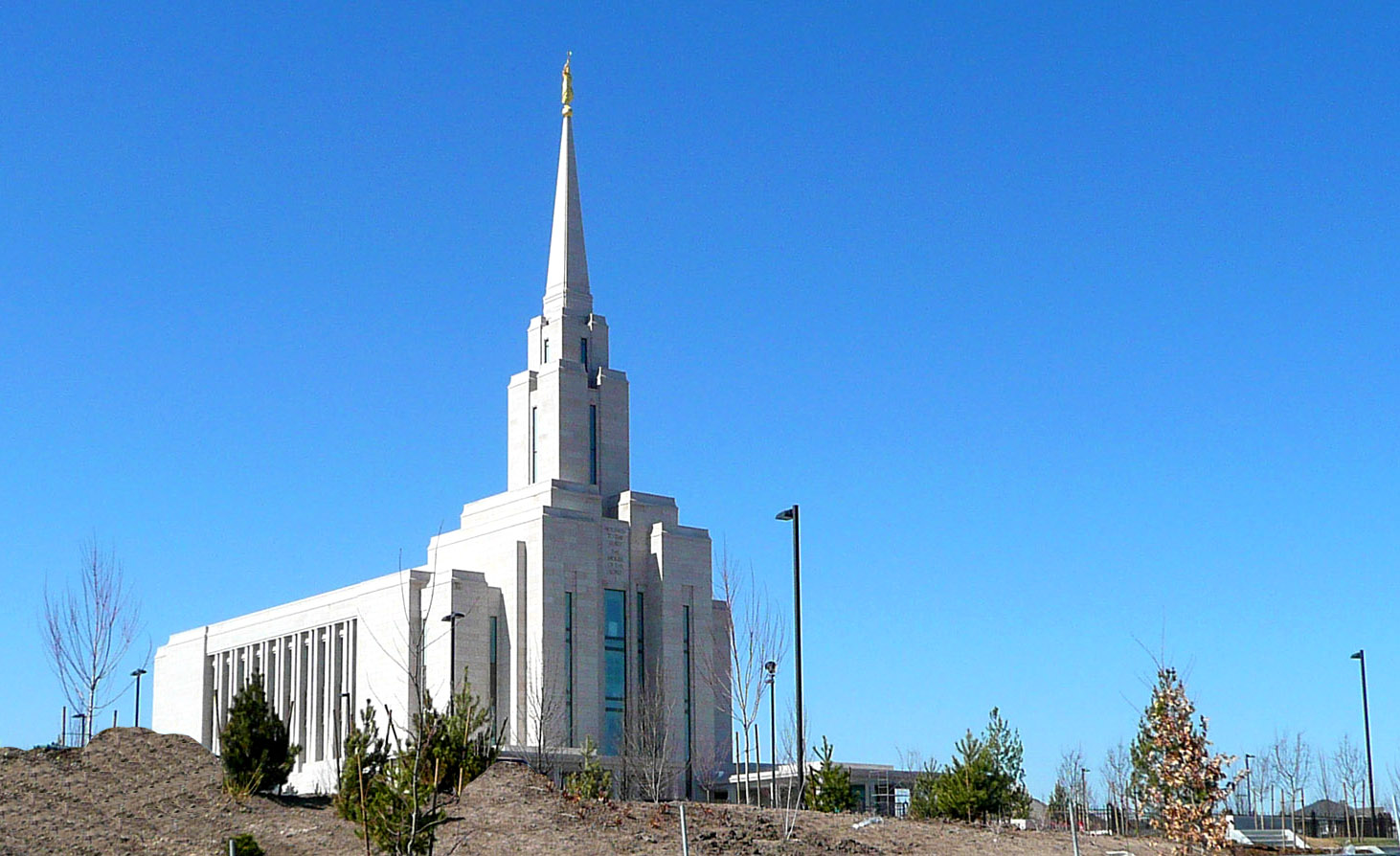
Oquirrh Mountain Temple nearly complete

On June 13, 2009, the spire was struck by lightning during a thunderstorm. The angel Moroni statue was tarnished, and was replaced on August 11, 2009.

The temple was initially dedicated by church president Thomas S. Monson on August 21, 2009, with nine total sessions held through August 23. A cornerstone ceremony was held before the first session, which included a local choir singing.

In 2020, like all others in the church, the Oquirrh Mountain Utah Temple was closed for a time in response to the COVID-19 pandemic.

== Design ==
Designed by Naylor Wentworth Lund Architects, the temple's architecture reflects both the cultural heritage of the South Jordan area and the spiritual significance of the church.

The temple is on an 11-acres, is 60,000 square feet, with a spire height of 193 feet, which includes the 9 foot angel Moroni statue. The surrounding landscaping has water fountain, grass fields, and flower gardens. These elements are designed to provide a tranquil setting to enhance the sacred atmosphere of the site.

The structure stands 183 feet tall, constructed with Uinta Gold granite from China. The exterior has art glass windows with stars, circles, and flutes, elements chosen for their symbolic significance and alignment with temple traditions. The design uses elements that are reflective of both the local culture and broader church symbolism.

The interior has limestone from Egypt and Morocco and white oak wood from Indiana and Kentucky throughout the temple, as well as bronze handrails, chandeliers with Swarovski crystals. White Oak doors cut for the temple came from the German Alps. Murals made for the temple as originals were created by church service missionaries, who were commissioned to create artwork for the temple under the directions of a senior artist. The temple includes six sealing rooms, four instruction rooms, a celestial room, a bride's room, and a baptistry, each designed for ceremonial use. The celestial room has a 15-foot-tall chandelier with 19,447 individual crystals.

The design uses symbolic elements representing Latter-day Saint symbolism, to provide deeper spiritual meaning to its appearance and function. Symbolism is important to church members and include the 10-foot-tall statue of the angel Moroni that sits atop the temple, which represents “the restoration of the gospel of Jesus Christ.”

== Temple presidents ==
The church's temples are directed by a temple president and matron, each serving for a term of three years. The president and matron oversee the administration of temple operations and provide guidance and training for both temple patrons and staff.

Serving from 2009 to 2012, the first president of the Oquirrh Mountain Utah Temple was Alan S. Layton, with the matron being Leslie P. Layton. As of 2024, Michael C. Cannon is the president, with Shauna L. Cannon serving as matron.

== Admittance ==
On January 31, 2009, the church announced the public open house that was held from June 1-August 1, 2009 (excluding Sundays). The temple was dedicated by Thomas S. Monson from August 21 from 23, 2009, in nine sessions.

Like all the church's temples, it is not used for Sunday worship services. To members of the church, temples are regarded as sacred houses of the Lord. Once dedicated, only church members with a current temple recommend can enter for worship.

== See also ==
- The Church of Jesus Christ of Latter-day Saints in Utah
- Comparison of temples of The Church of Jesus Christ of Latter-day Saints
- List of temples of The Church of Jesus Christ of Latter-day Saints
- List of temples of The Church of Jesus Christ of Latter-day Saints by geographic region
- Temple architecture (Latter-day Saints)

== Additional reading ==
- "Groundbreaking Held for Oquirrh Mountain Utah Temple". Newsroom. LDS Church. December 16, 2006. Archived from the original on January 4, 2007.
- Page, Jared; Moore, Carrie (December 1, 2006). "S. Jordan planners OK temple". Deseret Morning News. Archived from the original on September 18, 2012.
