= Don H. Staheli =

American author and member of the Church of Jesus Christ of Latter-day Saints

Don Hansen Staheli (born May 9, 1949) is an American author and member of the Church of Jesus Christ of Latter-day Saints (LDS Church). He was the personal secretary to church presidents Gordon B. Hinckley and Russell M. Nelson. Since November 2018, he has served as president of the Bountiful Utah Temple. Staheli is the author of the children's best-seller, The Story of the Walnut Tree, which was published in September 2000.

Staheli was born in Spanish Fork, Utah to Gerald Douglass Staheli and his wife, Nadine Hansen. As a young man Staheli served as a missionary in the LDS Church's Franco-Belgium Mission.

Staheli is a Licensed Clinical Social Worker (L.C.S.W.), and has a bachelor's degree in History and master's degrees in International Management and Social Work. He and his wife, Cyndy, are the parents of five children. The couple live in Bountiful, Utah. Cyndy Staheli has been a member of the Mormon Tabernacle Choir.

Staheli also worked for Family Services for 15 years. He also taught seminary and institute for the Church Educational System. He has contributed many articles to Meridian Magazine.

Staheli served as president of the LDS Church's France Paris Mission from July 2008 to July 2011. Previously, Staheli had served in the church as a regional representative, stake president and bishop. He was the secretary to the church's Quorum of the Twelve Apostles from his return from France in 2011 until early 2018, when he became Nelson's personal secretary.

== Works ==
- Just Hold Me: Embraced by the Savior's Love
- It's the Principle of the Thing
- The Healer's Art: Faith and the Healing Power of Jesus Christ (with Lloyd D. Newell)
- The Story of the Walnut Tree (with Robert T. Barrett)
- Mary, Sweet and Tender Maiden
