= Donald L. Staheli =

Second Quorum of the Seventy
- April 5, 1997 – September 30, 2006
- Called by: Gordon B. Hinckley
- End reason: Honorably released

Personal details
- Born: Donald Lafayette Staheli; October 19, 1931; St. George, Utah, United States
- Died: May 29, 2010 (aged 78); St. George, Utah, United States

Donald Lafayette Staheli (October 19, 1931 – May 29, 2010) was an American business executive and was a general authority of the Church of Jesus Christ of Latter-day Saints (LDS Church) from 1997 to 2006.

Staheli was born in St. George, Utah and was raised in Hurricane, Utah. He received a B.S. degree from Utah State University, followed by M.S. and Ph.D. degrees from the University of Illinois. He also served for two years in the United States Air Force.

Staheli was the CEO of Allied Mills and then CEO of Continental Grain. He was the CEO of Continental Grain and the chair of the U.S.–China Business Council at the time of his call as a general authority. He was also an advisor to the mayor of Shanghai, Zhu Rongji.

Staheli was serving as president of the LDS Church's Yorktown New York Stake at the time of his call as a general authority. He was living in New Canaan, Connecticut. He became a member of the Second Quorum of the Seventy in April 1997. His assignments as a general authority included serving as president of the North America Central Area at the time the Nauvoo Illinois Temple was dedicated. Staheli was released as a general authority in 2006.

He served as the first president of the Draper Utah Temple from its dedication in March 2009 until his death on May 29, 2010.
