= Alexander Beckstead =

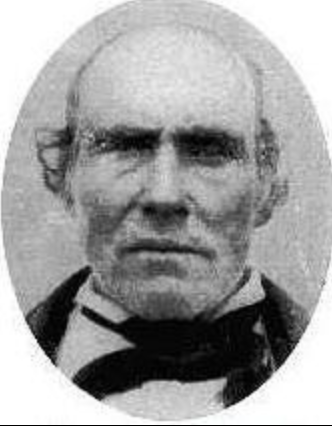
- Born: March 16, 1802; Williamsburg, Dundas, Upper Canada, British North America
- Died: February 25, 1870 (aged 67); West Jordan, Utah
- Spouses: Catherine Elinore Lince (m. January 25, 1823); Keziah Albina Petty (m. November 8, 1854); Clarissa Ann Gilson (m. February 3, 1856)

Alexander Beckstead (March 16, 1802 – February 25, 1870) was an early pioneer settler in Utah, and prominent member of the Church of Jesus Christ of Latter-day Saints. He was Born in Canada before living in various areas in the eastern United States. Alexander later migrated with most of his family to the Salt Lake Valley. Alexander was a practicing LDS Church member during the era of polygamy participation. He had three wives and was the father to many children. His descendants would go on to spread throughout the Utah Valley and later into parts of Southern Idaho and parts of Arizona. Alexander was a founding resident of the current Salt Lake County cities of South and West Jordan. Additionally, in the early years of Brigham Young University, a general mechanics laboratory was founded under the Beckstead family name by one of Alexander's descendants.

== Life ==
=== Childhood ===
Beckstead was born on March 16, 1802, in Williamsburg, Dundas County, Upper Canada. He was the sixth child of Francis Beckstead Sr. and Margaret Barkley Beckstead. Shortly after Alexander's birth, the Beckstead family moved from Dundas County to a 200-acre farm acquired by Francis Sr. through a land grant. It is presumed that Alexander worked on this farm with his family until he was married to his first wife Catherine Lince. After the marriage, he began to farm on his own. Francis Beckstead's farm would continue to be owned and operated by the Beckstead family until they migrated to DeWitt in Caldwell County, Missouri in 1839. Little else is recorded about Alexander's life until his conversion to the Church of Jesus Christ of Latter-day Saints in 1837.

=== Marriages and family ===
Alexander belonged to the Church of Jesus Christ of Latter-day Saints during its era of polygamy; Alexander was married to three different women. Alexander was married to his first wife, Catherine Lince, on January 25, 1823, as mentioned above. Together, they had 15 children. He married his second wife, Keziah Albina Petty, on November 8, 1854. They had ten children. Finally, Alexander married his third wife, Clarissa Ann Gilson, on February 3, 1856, with whom he had eight children. Upon his death, Alexander was a father to 32 children and grandfather to 86. Alexander's family was known for their loyalty to the United States of America and their faithfulness to the LDS church.

The Beckstead's loyalty to the United States was illustrated by the U.S. government. In 1846, they requested 500 men from LDS church to join U.S. forces in the Mexican-American War. This group of 500 was known as the Mormon Battalion. Three members of the Beckstead family joined the Mormon Battalion and all eventually returned to their families. Other members of the Beckstead family additionally served the United States military by fighting in the conflict known as the Blackhawk War. The Beckstead family's faithfulness to the LDS church was show through their continual support of LDS church leaders and LDS pioneer efforts. Many members of the Beckstead family helped struggling LDS pioneers endure the hardships of crossing the plains on their way to the Salt Lake Valley. Alexander often sent resources to individuals of the LDS community who were traveling to the Salt Lake Valley.

Other members of the Beckstead family would move along the trail, providing resources and helping to bury the deceased in their journeys. Alexander and his family did much to assist the LDS Church as it became established in the Salt Lake Valley upon the arrival of the pioneers in 1849.

=== Faith ===
In 1836, missionaries from the Church of Jesus Christ of Latter-day Saints traveled to Canada. These Latter-day Saint missionaries began to preach in the area and eventually met the Beckstead family in 1837. Soon after, Alexander and twenty-two other members of his family were baptized into the Church of Jesus Christ of Latter-day Saints on April 10, 1837. Alexander would continue to be help the LDS church in Canada, Missouri, Illinois, and eventually Utah. Alexander and his family were key to the growth of the LDS Church upon their arrival to the Salt Lake Valley with many of them holding positions of leadership within the forming settlements and religious hierarchies. Many of the Beckstead family helped with various aspects of the physical construction of towns, churches, and other buildings.

Alexander was described as remaining faithful to the LDS Church until the time of his death as noted in the obituary published by the Deseret News.

== Migration to Utah ==
Shortly after the Beckstead family converted to the LDS faith, the Becksteads sold their property in Canada and traveled by ox-drawn wagons to Latter-day Saint headquarters in Dewitt, Caldwell County, Missouri. They were among the first members of the LDS community from Canada to migrate to Dewitt. The Becksteads made this journey in order to join other members. After leaving Canada, two members of the Beckstead family died: Alexander's father, Francis Beckstead Sr, and a young unspecified member of the family. Upon their arrival to Missouri, the Becksteads were detained by a mob that was antagonistic toward the LDS faith. They were held in captivity for two weeks before being rescued by a party of members of their religion. This rescue party was led by the first President of the Church of Jesus Christ of Latter-day Saints, Joseph Smith. This event was among the beginnings of persecution that members of the LDS faith would face, including families such as the Becksteads. Eventually, the family, along with other nearby members of the LDS community, were forced to leave Caldwell County and migrate to Far West, Missouri. The Beckstead family spent the winter of 1838 in Far West. The following spring, the Becksteads again experienced religious persecution. New mobs arose in the local community. This continual persecution forced the Beckstead family to flee to Nauvoo, Illinois, where they joined another LDS settlement.

This continuous religious persecution would plague the Beckstead family, as well as nearly all LDS members. Even after relocating to Nauvoo, Illinois, Alexander, along with the rest of the settlement, continued to face persecution and threats of violence. Eventually, following the murders of the first president of the Church of Jesus Christ of Latter-day Saints, Joseph Smith, as well as other prominent LDS leaders in 1844, the decision to evacuate to a new territory was made. Under the leadership of Brigham Young, the second President of the church, LDS pioneers began relocating to the Salt Lake Valley in 1846. The Salt Lake Valley was under the control of the Republic of Mexico at the time. The migration of the LDS pioneers to the Salt Lake Valley was the last large migration movement that the LDS community would undertake. Alexander and his family were among the many LDS members to join the mass migration west.

Alexander specifically left as part of the 247 people who migrated west in the Allen Taylor Pioneer Party. The Allen Taylor Party left for the Salt Lake Valley on July 5, 1849, and arrived on Oct 10, 1849. After arriving in the Salt Lake Valley, Alexander and his family spent the winter of 1849 in Murray, Utah. That following spring Alexander would take part of his family and temporarily live in what would later become the town of West Jordan later that year.

== Early settlement in South and West Jordan ==
Alexander purchased the land that would later become South and West Jordan from George A. Smith. Upon first moving to the area in 1849, Alexander, as well as others, including fellow pioneers from the Allen Taylor Party, lived in temporary homes called dugouts carved into the hillside. These small living spaces were constructed largely by hollowing out the center, typically dressing the cavity with furniture and a door. Later Alexander, including his sons and other pioneers, would permanently move his family to the South Jordan area in 1859.

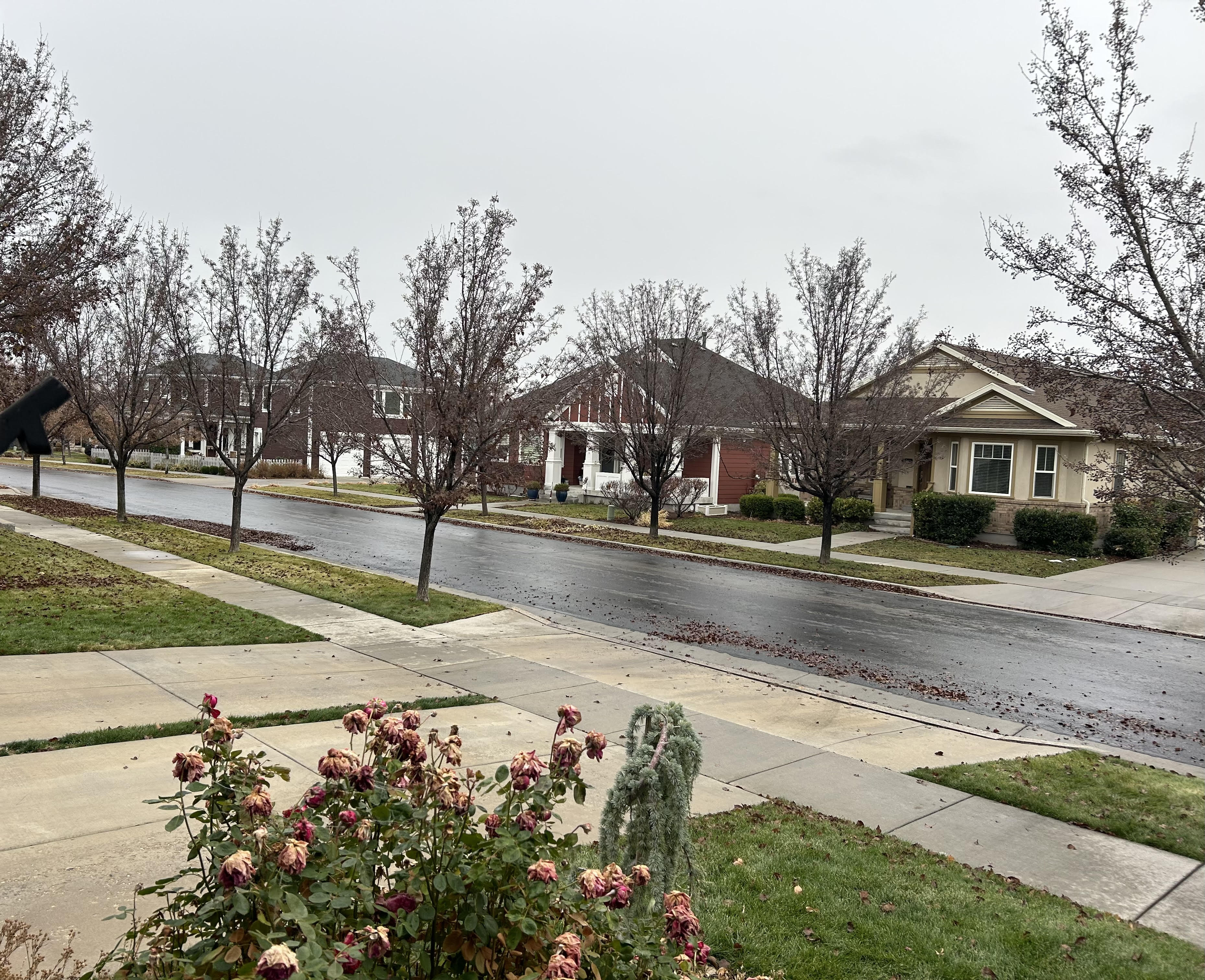
Daybreak Community, South Jordan, Utah, 2023

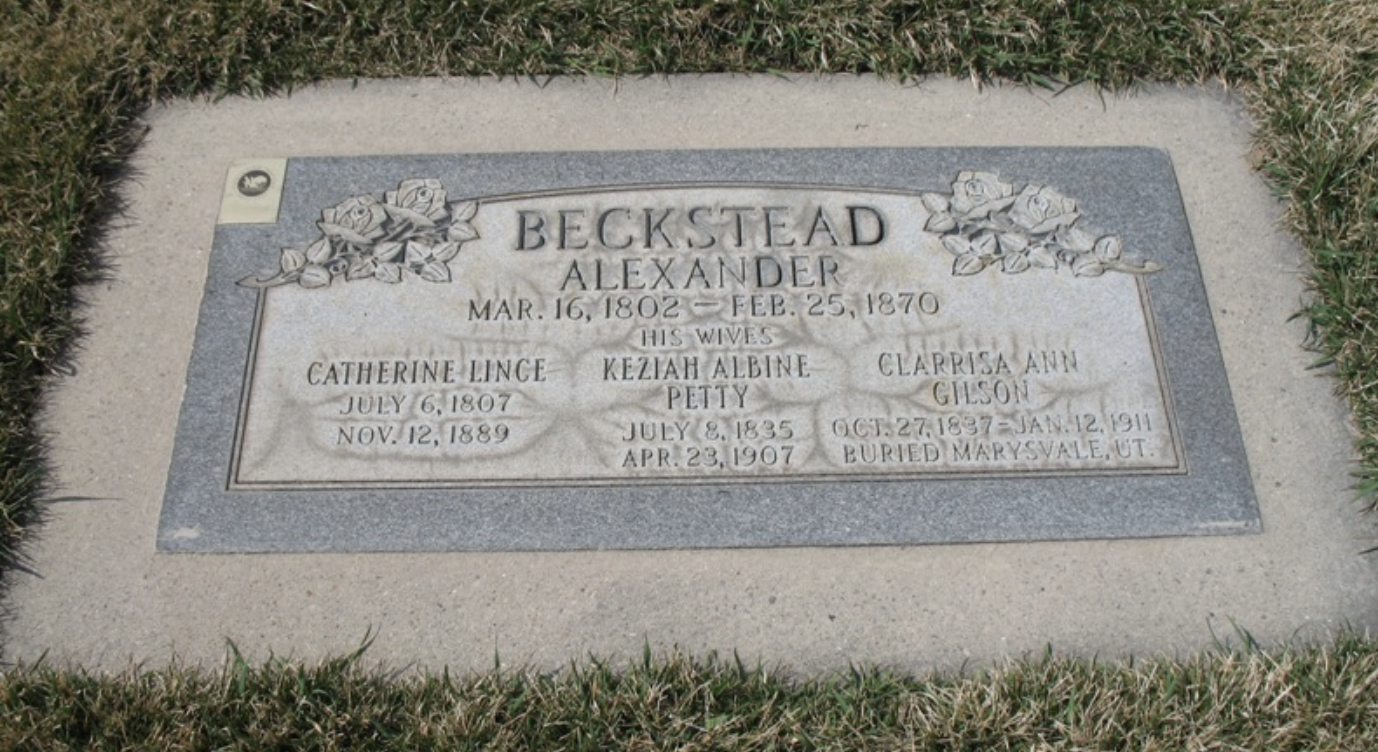
Gravestone of Alexander Beckstead

At the time of his arrival to the South Jordan area, the area was inhabited by indigenous wildlife, and due to the harshness of the environment, the only naturally growing plant was sagebrush. The only source of water in the area was the Jordan River. The Beckstead family immediately began to work with pick and shovel as they dug what would later be called "The Beckstead Ditch." The canal brought water from the Jordan River further inland to their living space, allowing them to begin agricultural production. After fashioning a water source, the forming community would continue to develop the area by digging wells to provide safe drinking water. With water now accessible, more LDS migrants found South Jordan an attractive location. Shortly after, Alexander began selling plots of cultivated land to incoming settlers. Alexander also helped the first blacksmith shop in the area, adding to the further development of both South and West Jordan.

== Bibliography ==
- Nauvoo Community Project. “Alexander Beckstead", November 15, 1899 - http://nauvoo.byu.edu/ViewPerson.aspx?ID=24320
- Brigham Young Academy, “White and Blue 1899-11-15 vol. 3 no. 1,” November 15, 1899 - https://contentdm.lib.byu.edu/digital/collection/whiteblue/id/6607
- Deseret News, “Died”, Digitized by J. Willard Marriott Library, University of Utah, March 3, 1870 - https://newspapers.lib.utah.edu/ark:/87278/s61n8vkc
- Bateman, Ronald R. “Of Dugouts and Spires” 1998. pp. 6–8.
- Esshom, Frank. “Pioneers and Prominent Men of Utah” pg 745, Pioneers Book Publishing Company, 1913 - https://archive.org/details/pioneersprominen02essh/page/744/mode/2up
- Jenson, Andrew. The Historical Record (Salt Lake City, UT: Andrew Jenson, 1889), 1:341-342 - https://archive.org/details/historicalrecord06jens/page/342/mode/2up
- Powell, Allen Kent & Bateman, Ronald R. “Utah History Encyclopedia”, published by the University of Utah Press, 1994 - https://www.uen.org/utah_history_encyclopedia/s/SOUTH_JORDAN.shtml
- Seager, Barbara Winward, “Alexander Beckstead & Catherine Lince”, compiled July 1997 from: Descendants of John Beckstead by Lee Allen Beckstead -1963 - http://rytting.net/famhistory/Family_Histories/Hunsaker_Histories/Alexander_Beckstead.pdf
- Wilkinson, Ernest L. “Brigham Young University: The First One Hundred Years” (Provo, UT: Brigham Young University Press, 1975), 1:379 - https://archive.org/details/brighamyounguniv01wilk/page/378/mode/2up
- Larsen, Ramona. “History of Samuel Alexander Beckstead,” 1924.
