= Lynn Staheli =

American pediatric orthopedist (1933–2021)

Lynn Taylor Staheli (November 13, 1933 - August 9, 2021) was an American pediatric orthopedist. He was a founding editor of the Journal of Pediatric Orthopaedics and founder of Global HELP Organization, a nonprofit organization that provides free medical information in developing countries.

In 2018, Dr. Staheli was recognized with the Humanitarian Award at the annual conference hosted by Pediatric Orthopaedic Society of North America (POSNA).

== Research ==
Staheli's research on developmental variations during childhood has shown that conditions such as flexible flatfeet, intoeing and bowlegs are normal variations that do not require treatment. This information helped catalyze the decline of unnecessary, ineffective and unpleasant treatments, such as corrective shoes, night splints, braces and shoes. In 1991, he was quoted in the New York Times as stating that "people do better when they're free, and the foot does better when it's free."

== Global HELP ==
Lynn and his wife, Lana Staheli, founded Global HELP (Health Education using Low-cost Publications) in 2002. Global HELP distributes information in the form of PDFs and videos online and through DVD libraries.
