= Willamette Valley Oregon Temple =

Latter-day Saint temple awaiting dedication

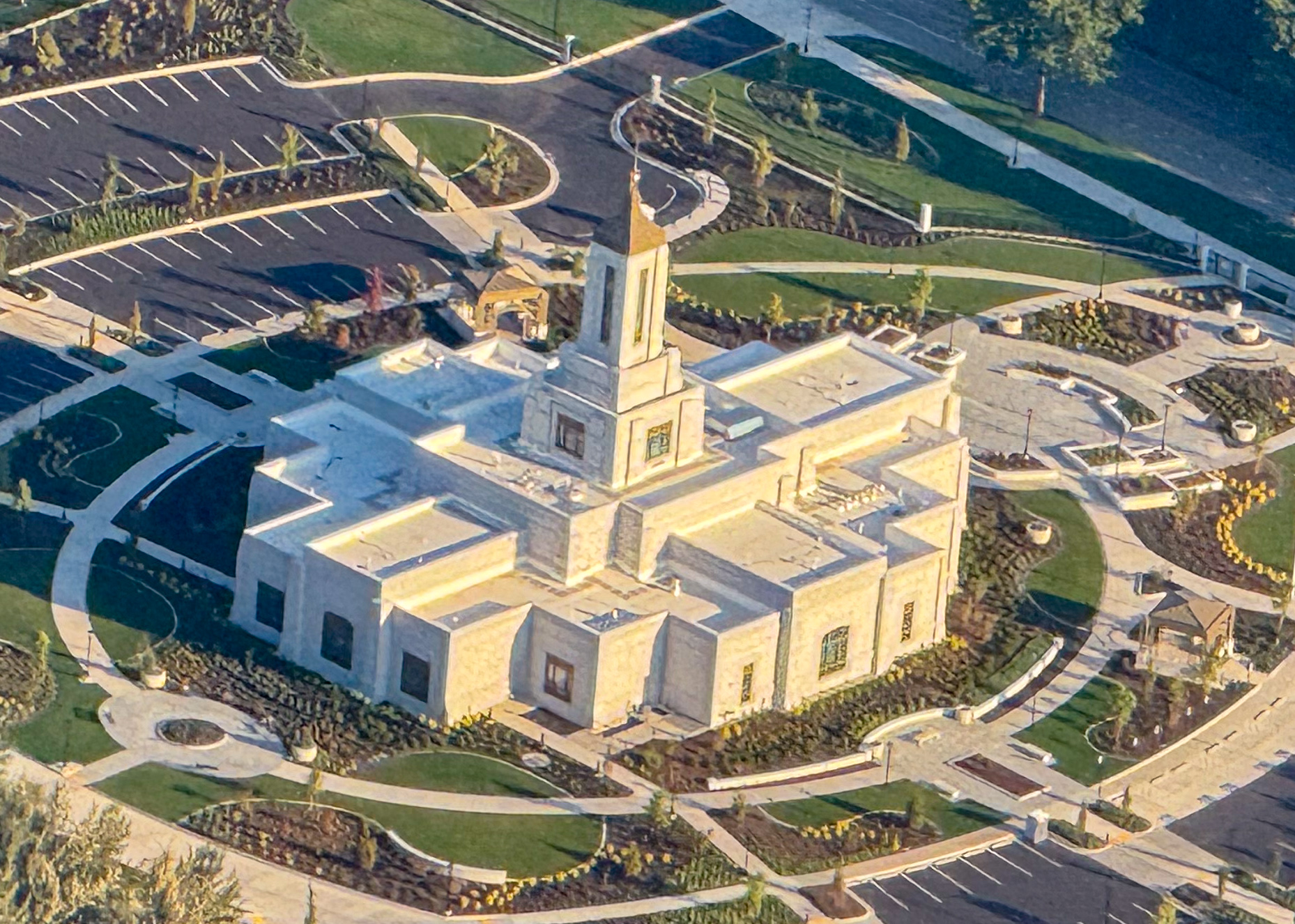
- The temple in September 2025
- Interactive map of Willamette Valley Oregon Temple
- Number: 218
- Dedication: 7 June 2026, by Dieter F. Uchtdorf
- Site: 10.29 acres (4.16 ha)
- Floor area: 30,635 ft^{2} (2,846.1 m^{2})
- Official website • News & images

Additional information
- Announced: 4 April 2021, by Russell M. Nelson
- Groundbreaking: 29 October 2022, by Valeri V. Cordón
- Open house: 23 April – 9 May 2026
- Location: Springfield, Oregon, U.S.
- Coordinates: 44°05′21″N 123°01′56″W
- Baptistries: 1
- Ordinance rooms: 2
- Sealing rooms: 2
- Notes: Official name, anticipated size, location, and exterior rendering released on September 2, 2021.

The Willamette Valley Oregon Temple is a temple of the Church of Jesus Christ of Latter-day Saints in Springfield, Oregon. Church president Russell M. Nelson announced plans to construct the temple on April 4, 2021, during general conference. It is the third temple in Oregon, following those in Portland and Medford, and is designed to serve more than 30,000 church members in the central-western part of the state. Ground was broken for the temple on October 29, 2022, with Valeri V. Cordón, a general authority and first counselor in the church’s North America West Area, presiding. The temple is single-story and approximately 30,000 square feet (2,800 m^{2}) on a 10.5-acre (4.2 ha) site. A public open house was held from April 23 to May 9, 2026. The temple was dedicated by Dieter F. Uchtdorf, acting president of the Quorum of the Twelve Apostles.

== History ==
=== Announcement ===
During the April 2021 General Conference, church president Russell M. Nelson announced plans for a temple in Eugene, Oregon. This was one of 20 new temples announced worldwide, the most ever announced by the church on a single day. At the time, Oregon had approximately 154,000 church members in over 300 congregations. Its name, the “Willamette Valley Oregon Temple,” was announced on September 2, 2021, the same day the site location and architectural rendering were released.

=== Site and design ===
The temple site is a 10.5-acre property at the intersection of International Boulevard and Corporate Way in Springfield. The exterior rendering released depicted a single-story white structure with a layered wall design, a central arch entrance, landscaped walkways, and a single spire above the main entrance. The building will include two instruction rooms, two sealing rooms, and a baptistry, with a total floor area of approximately 30,000 square feet.

=== Groundbreaking ===
A groundbreaking ceremony took place on October 29, 2022, with Valeri V. Cordón, a church general authority, presiding. The invitation-only event included local church leaders, members, and city officials. In the dedicatory prayer, Cordón expressed hope that the temple would serve as “a beacon of hope and peace that inspires this community to come unto Christ, even in its construction phase,” and honored both early and present church members in Oregon. Construction began October 31, 2022, with an anticipated duration of two to three years.

=== Open house and dedication ===
On November 24, 2025, the church announced a public open house would be held from Thursday, April 23, through Saturday, May 9, 2026, excluding Sundays. A media day preceded the open house on April 20, 2026, followed by two days of tours for invited guests on April 21–22. On June 7, 2026, Dieter F. Uchtdorf, acting president of the Quorum of the Twelve Apostles, dedicated the temple. Over 200 church members attended inside the temple, with the services also being broadcast to meetinghouses in the temple district.

== Temple leadership and admittance ==
The church's temples are directed by a temple president and matron, each typically serving for a term of three years. The president and matron oversee the administration of temple operations and provide guidance and training for both temple patrons and staff. The first president and matron are Gregory L. Stevens and Christina L. Stevens.

A public open house was held from April 23 to May 9, 2026. Like all the church's temples, it is not used for Sunday worship services. To members of the church, temples are regarded as sacred houses of the Lord. Once dedicated, only church members with a current temple recommend can enter for worship.

== See also ==
- The Church of Jesus Christ of Latter-day Saints in Oregon
- Comparison of temples (LDS Church)
- List of temples (LDS Church)
- List of temples by geographic region (LDS Church)
- Temple architecture (LDS Church)

Temples in and near Oregon

= Operating

= Under construction

= Announced

= Temporarily Closed
