= Religion in Oregon =

Overview of the religion in the state of Oregon

Religion in Oregon (2014)
1. Protestantism (43.0%)
2. Roman Catholicism (12.0%)
3. The Church of Jesus Christ of Latter Day Saints (4.00%)
4. Eastern Orthodoxy (1.00%)
5. Other Christian (1.00%)
6. No religion (31.0%)
7. Judaism (2.00%)
8. Islam (1.00%)
9. Other religion (4.00%)
10. Don't know (1.00%)

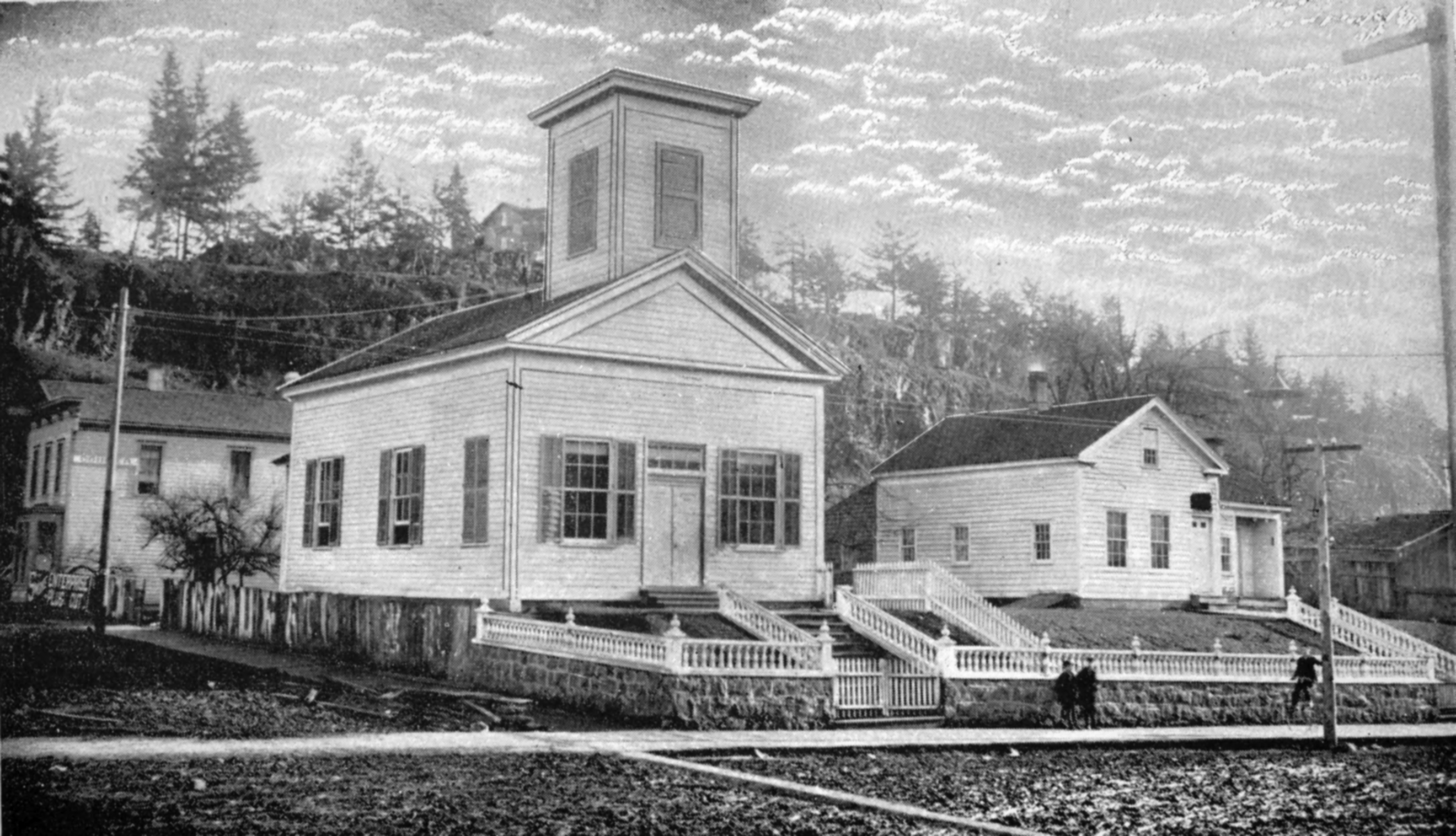
Oregon City Methodist Church, the first in Oregon

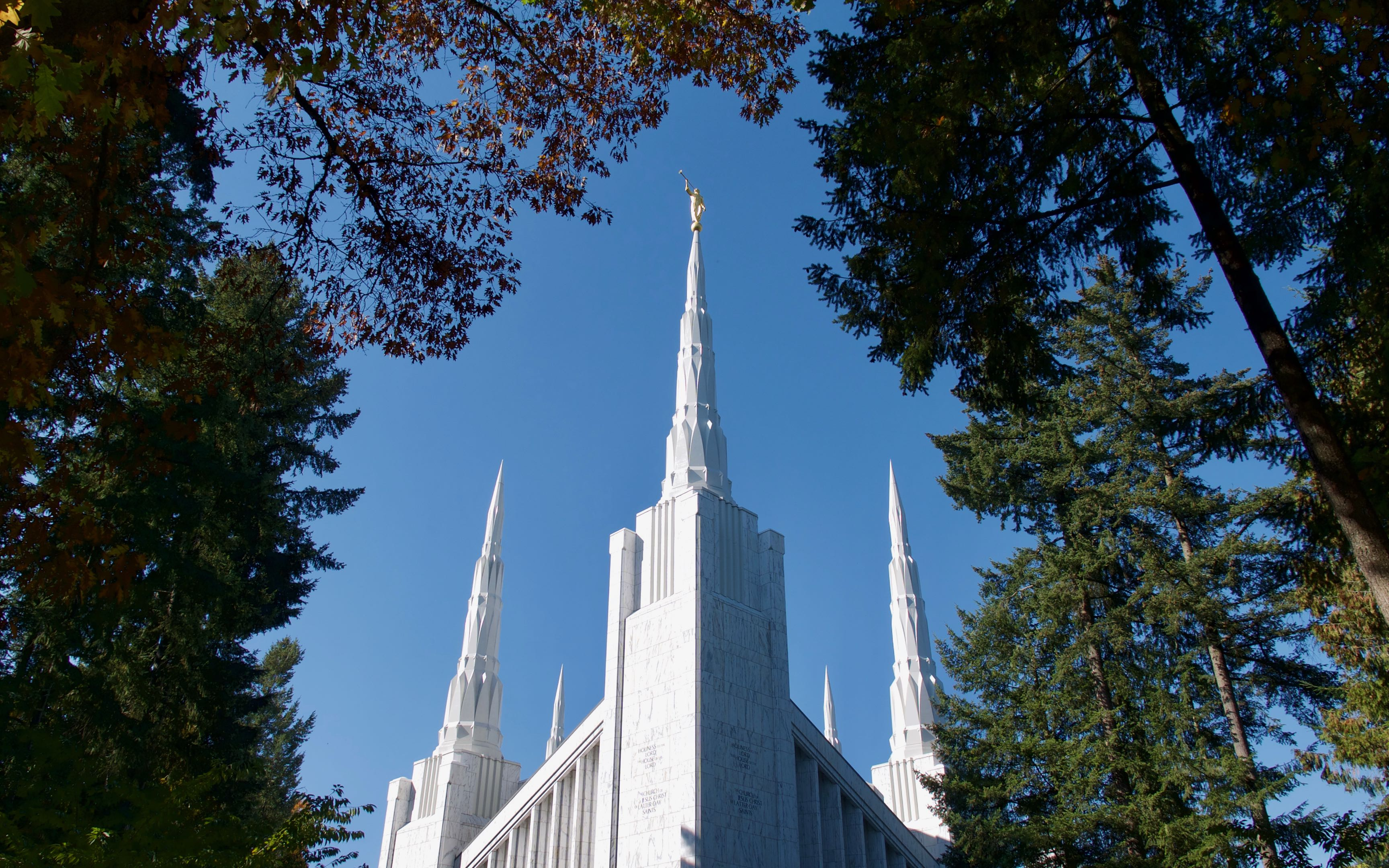
The Portland Oregon Temple is a The Church of Jesus Christ of Latter-day Saints temple. Members of The Church of Jesus Christ of Latter-Day Saints are the second largest religious denomination in Oregon and many influential Latter-Day Saints have came from Oregon including US Senator Gordon H. Smith, Secretary of State Dennis Richardson, Deputy Secretary of State Rich Vial, Professional Basketball player Danny Ainge, and State Representative Tom Butler.

Religion in the state of Oregon is remarkable in the United States, with its population ranking among the highest of religiously unaffiliated adults in the entire nation. According to a 2014 report by the Pew Research Center, 31% of Oregon's population was religiously unaffiliated, (Note: According to data from the Pew Research Center from 2014, the percentage was 31%, though the Public Religion Research Institute reported 37% in 2017.) making it the second-highest percentage after that of Vermont.

Of the Oregon residents identifying as religiously-affiliated, the largest denomination is Roman Catholicism, which makes up approximately 14% of the state's overall population.

== History ==
In 1836, French Canadian pioneers on the French Prairie in the Willamette Valley built a log cabin chapel along the Willamette River. The first Protestant church in Oregon was built in Oregon City starting in 1842. Completed in 1844, this Methodist church was also the first Protestant church on the continental West Coast of what became the United States. The first Roman Catholic official presence in Oregon was the apostolic vicariate for the Oregon Territory begun in 1843. By 1846, the archdiocese of Oregon was formally established. Informally considered part of the Unchurched Belt, Oregon is known for historically having a lack of religiosity compared to other U.S. states.

== Current statistics ==
=== Denominations ===
Similar to many northern U.S. states, Oregon's largest religious group (among Christians and in general), based on a 2008 Pew Research Center survey, was Roman Catholics, making up 14% of the state's total population. All denominations of Protestant accounted for 30%, Church of Jesus Christ of Latter-Day Saints for 5%, Buddhists for 2%, and unaffiliated for 27%, all higher than the national average. A 2009 Gallup poll found that 69% Oregonians identified with a Christian religion.

Oregon was lower than the national average in people who identify as mainline Protestants, historically black Christians, Catholics, Orthodox Christians, Jehovah's Witnesses, Jews and Muslims. Oregon tracks the national average in its number of Hindus. The largest denominations by number of adherents in 2000 were the Roman Catholic Church with 348,239; The Church of Jesus Christ of Latter-day Saints with 104,312; and the Assemblies of God with 49,357.

While Oregon has higher than average rates of evangelical Christianity and Latter-Day Saints compared to mainline or orthodox sects of Christianity, Judaism and Islam, it does have a slightly higher percentage of Buddhists regardless of sect, and is part of overall growth in Buddhists not of ethnically Asian origin in the West. Oregon also contains the largest community of Russian Old Believers to be found in the United States (nearly 10,000 as of 2002), due to a relatively large immigrant population from areas where the church originated.

=== Lack of religiosity ===
A plurality of religious preference by state, 2001. Data is unavailable for Alaska and Hawaii.: <30% / <40% / <50% / >50%; / / / / Catholic; / / / / Baptist; / / / / Methodist; / / / / Lutheran; / / / / Mormon; / / / / No religion

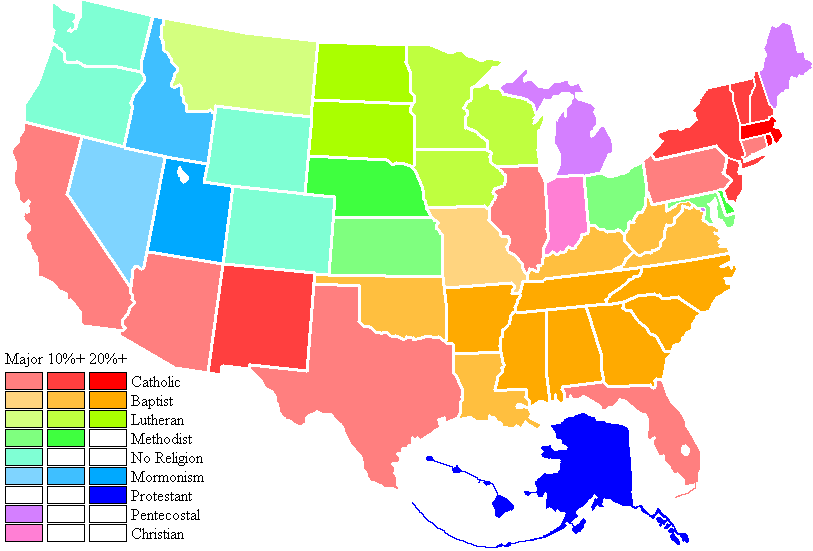
Percentage of religion against average, 2001.

A 2003 study, released once every 10 years, listed Benton County, Oregon as the least religious county per capita in the United States. Only 1 in 4 people indicated that they were affiliated with one of the 149 religious groups the study identified. The study indicated that some of the disparity, however, may be attributed to the popularity of less traditional religions (ones not included as an option in the study) in the Pacific Northwest.

In a 2009 Gallup poll, Oregon ranked #1 of US states with the highest percentage of residents who were unaffiliated with any religion, at 24.6%. Although 46% of Oregonians identify religion as being "very important", a full 40% of Oregonians (including those affiliated with a religion) seldom or never attend services.

In a different 2009 Gallup poll, Oregon was ranked as the seventh least religious state. In response to the question, "Is religion an important part of your life?", 53% of Oregonians responded "yes". The most religious state was Mississippi, with 85%, and the least religious state was Vermont, with 42%. The states less religious than Oregon, in order, are Washington, Alaska, Massachusetts, Maine, New Hampshire, and Vermont. In a 2006 Gallup poll, Oregonians tied for seventh state with the lowest church attendance, at 32%, along with California and Washington. Church attendance ranged from 58% to 24% in the poll.

According to a 2017 study from the Public Religion Research Institute, the percentage of unaffiliated individuals was 36% (second-highest to Vermont, which was reported as 41% religiously-unaffiliated).

== See also ==
- Religion in Portland, Oregon
- History of Oregon
- History of religion in the United States
- Irreligion in the United States
- Politics of Oregon
- Religion in the United States
- Roman Catholic Archdiocese of Portland
- The Church of Jesus Christ of Latter-day Saints in Oregon
