= The Church of Jesus Christ of Latter-day Saints in Oregon =

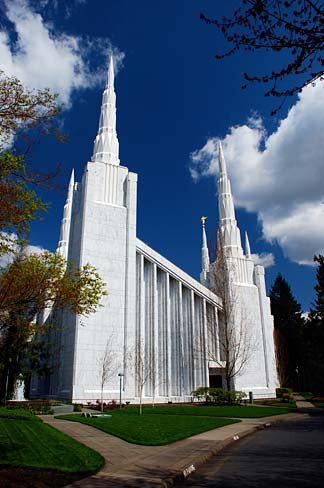
- The Portland Oregon Temple
- Area: US West
- Members: 148,062 (2025)
- Stakes: 34
- Wards: 233
- Branches: 45
- Total Congregations: 278
- Missions: 3
- Temples: 3
- FamilySearch Centers: 76

Membership in Oregon
Year	Membership
1920	2,796
1930	5,185
1940	8,799
1950	17,885
1960	29,920
1970	48,997
1980	94,093
1990	113,774
1999	134,438
2009	145,429
2019	153,540
2025	148,062

The Church of Jesus Christ of Latter-day Saints in Oregon refers to the Church of Jesus Christ of Latter-day Saints (LDS Church) and its members in Oregon. Oregon has the 9th most members of the church of any U.S. state. Members have had considerable influence in the state throughout its contemporary history and many influential Latter-day Saints have come from Oregon, including Senator Gordon H. Smith.

== History ==
=== Early history ===
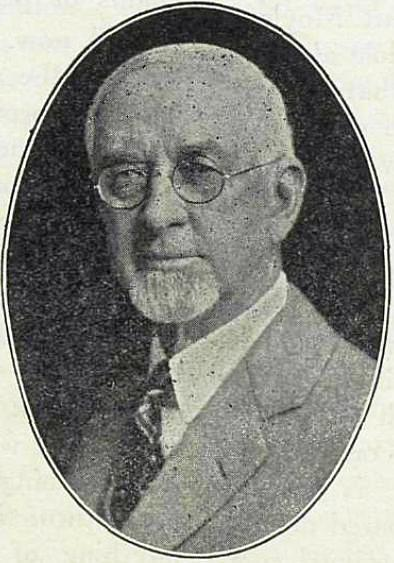
Charles W. Nibley's business ventures led many Saints to settle Oregon.

Missionaries were sent into Oregon from California as early as 1855. The Northwestern States Mission was created in 1897 under the Oneida Stake with George C. Parkinson, who was also the Oneida stake president, as president, and was headquartered in Portland in 1901, where missionaries had arrived in 1857. The mission was expanded to include the state of Montana in 1898, with the Montana Mission being dissolved and Franklin S. Bramwell being called as president.

The establishment of the Oregon Lumber Company by Charles W. Nibley, the creation of a lumber mill by David Eccles on the North Powder River, and the purchase of sugar beet farms led to the migration of Latter-day Saint families to the Baker area. The first branch in Oregon was created in Baker City on July 23, 1893. The first stake was organized from various branches of the Church in Eastern Oregon on June 9, 1901, as the Union Stake (later the La Grande Stake), centered primarily in Union and Baker counties.

The branches in the stake were organized into the first wards in Oregon in La Grande, Mount Glen, Alicel, Baker, Imbler, and Nibley. Bramwell was called to serve as president of the Union Stake, with him serving as both stake and mission president for about a year until he was released as president of the Northwestern States Mission in 1902. Bramwell served as stake president until 1914.

=== Early 20th century ===
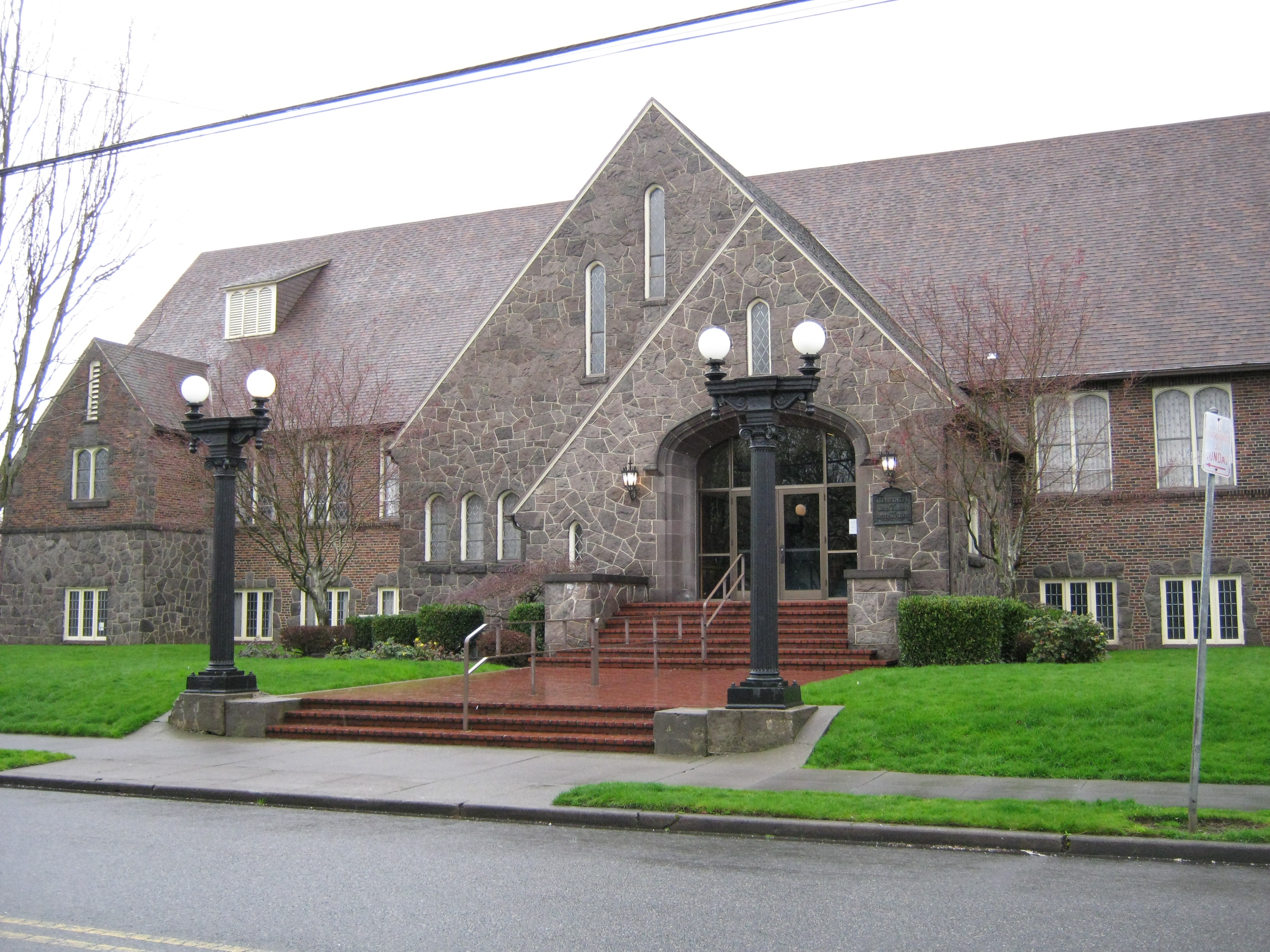
The Portland Tabernacle. The first purpose-built LDS chapel in Oregon.

E. Kimbark MacColl's analysis of Portland history states, "Portland was well endowed with churches, with approximately one for every 600 residents" in the 1890s. In his survey of six leading denominations and all 25 missions, no mention was made of LDS Church denominations or missions.

In 1898, missionaries George and Sam Parkinson of Idaho were sent to Portland to determine whether missionaries should be sent to the city. Jens Christensen Westergaard found out about the missionaries' visit when reading a copy of The Oregonian. Westergaard, who with his wife Petrine had been baptized years before in Sweden but had been unable to practice due to the lack of Church presence in Portland, went to multiple hotels until he found the one with the missionaries. He left a note asking them to come to his house. The next day the missionaries visited with Westergaard and his wife and informed him that they would be writing an unfavorable report about sending missionaries to Portland. The Westergaards asked the elders to send missionaries to Portland and they soon arrived. The Westergaards were later re-baptized in the Willamette River.

The Portland Branch was created on December 19, 1899, and met in a rented room in the Alisky Building at the corner of Morrison and Third. Westergaard was called as Branch President. A permanent chapel, the Portland Tabernacle, was built in 1929, ready for an open house on February 15–17. The building "carried the architectural scheme of an old English manor, being constructed of dense lava stone and bricks of the clinker type, and is declared particularly suited to western Oregon climate and surroundings." It included a maternity room and a basement with 14 classrooms. The architect was C. R. Kaufman, and construction had begun on August 1, 1928.

The completion of the Oregon Short Line Railroad helped bring additional Church members into Oregon, as did the defense industry from World War I and World War II. In 1930 the only wards in Oregon were La Grande 1st and 2nd, Baker, Union, Imbler, and Mt. Glen, with branches in Bend, Eugene, Klamath Falls, Medford, Portland, Hood River, and Salem and total membership of 3,226. A stake was created in Portland on June 26, 1938, with four more in the 1950s, thanks to membership increase with the post-World War II boom. The Medford Stake became the Church's 400th in 1964, and the Portland Temple was dedicated in 1989.

=== Contemporary history ===
The Medford Temple was dedicated in 2000, with the Willamette Valley Temple being announced in 2021 and dedicated in 2026. In 2023, a temple was announced for Vancouver, Washington which is likely to serve some members in Oregon. A Visitors Center was added on the ground of the Portland Temple in 2012. Oregon is now home to 3 temples, the latest of which is the Willamette Valley Temple.

In 2026, Oregon was home to 233 wards, 45 branches, 34 stakes, and 153,936 Church members. Oregon currently has 76 FamilySearch Centers.

== County statistics ==
List of LDS Church adherents in each county as of 2010 according to the Association of Religion Data Archives: Note: Each county adherent count reflects meetinghouse location of congregation and not by location of residence. Census count reflects location of residence which may skew percent of population where adherents reside in a different county as their congregational meetinghouse.

County	Congregations	Adherents	% of Population
Baker	4	1,363	8.45
Benton	6	2,892	3.38
Clackamas	29	14,058	3.74
Clatsop	2	1,483	4.00
Columbia	5	2,477	5.02
Coos	4	2,626	4.17
Crook	2	1,027	4.90
Curry	3	994	4.45
Deschutes	9	5,174	3.28
Douglas	7	4,540	4.22
Gilliam	0		
Grant	2	462	6.21
Harney	2	678	9.14
Hood River	1	689	3.08
Jackson	15	8,471	4.17
Jefferson	1	584 26.89	2.69
Josephine	7	4,143	5.01
Klamath	8	3,133	4.72
Lake	2	412	5.22
Lane	24	12,687	3.61
Lincoln	3	1,563	3.40
Linn	11	4,224	3.62
Malheur	13	4,284	13.68
Marion	25	10,201	3.24
Morrow	2	785	7.03
Multnomah	25	16,721	2.27
Polk	11	4,648	6.16
Sherman	0		
Tillamook	2	879	3.48
Umatilla	13	4,748	6.26
Union	7	2,348	9.12
Wallowa	1	330	4.71
Wasco	2	1,084	4.30
Washington	45	23,763	4.49
Wheeler	1	48	3.33
Yamhill	10	4,446	4.48

== Stakes ==
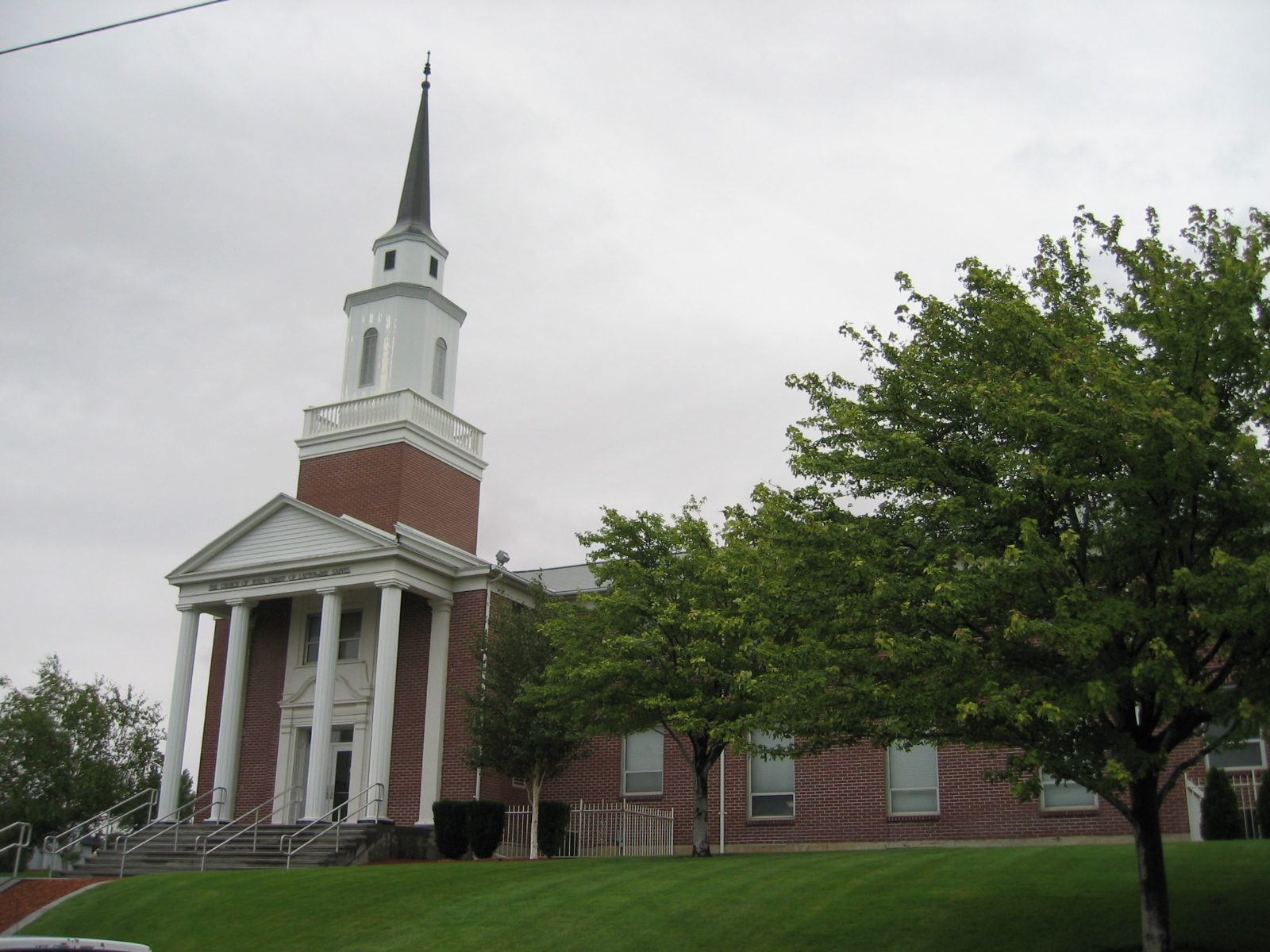
LDS Church meetinghouse in Pendleton, Oregon.

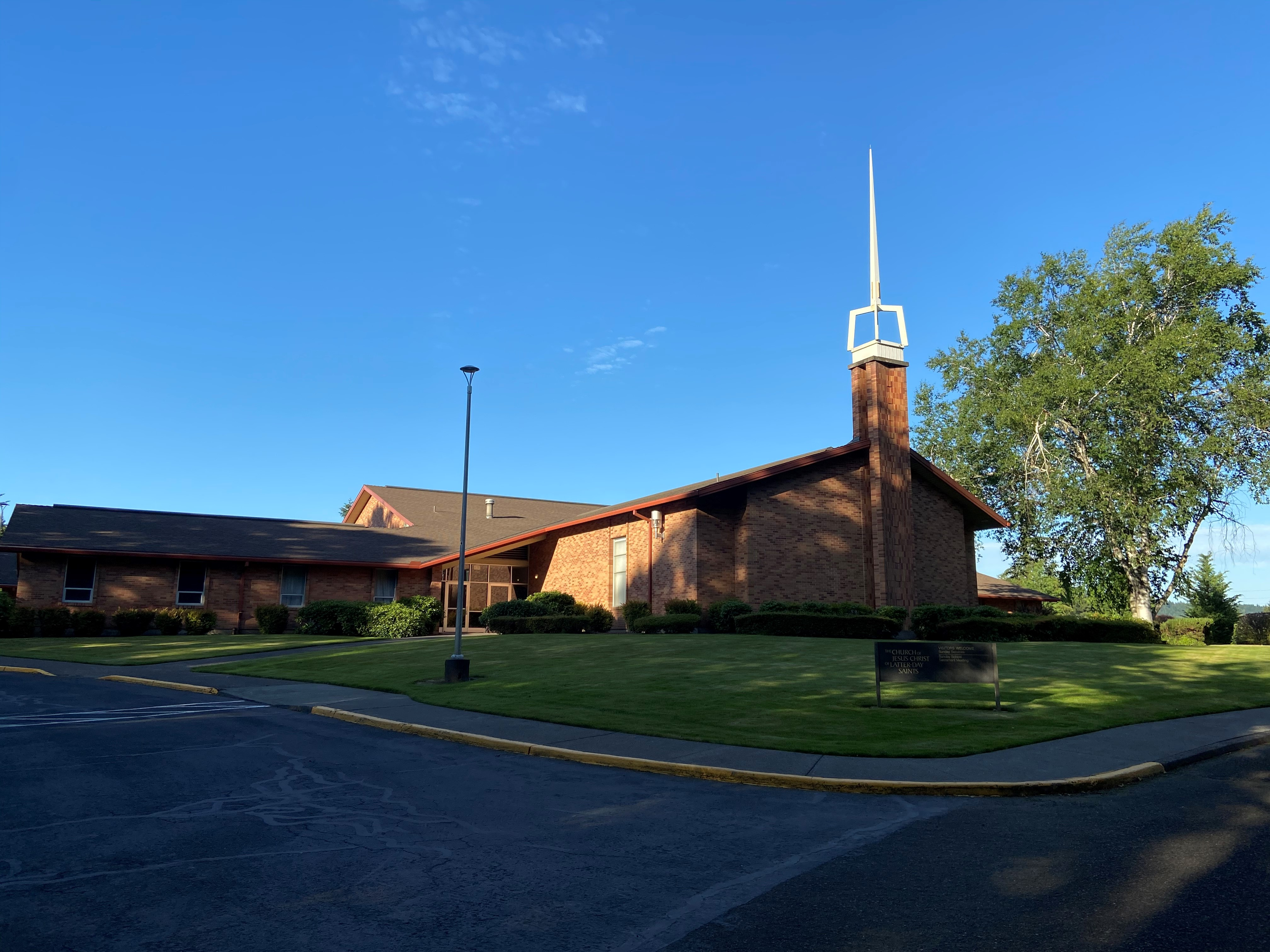
A Meetinghouse in Milwaukie

As of June 2026, Oregon had the following stakes:

Stake	Organized	Mission	Temple District
Beaverton Oregon	10 Nov 1963	Oregon Portland	Portland Oregon
Beaverton Oregon West	12 Nov 1995	Oregon Portland	Portland Oregon
Bend Oregon	15 Dec 1968	Oregon Salem	Willamette Valley Oregon
Caldwell Idaho Snake River (Note: Stake located outside of Oregon with congregation(s) meeting in Oregon)	26 Mar 2023	Idaho Boise	Meridian Idaho
Cedar Mill Oregon	31 Oct 1982	Oregon Portland	Portland Oregon
Central Point Oregon	7 Mar 1982	Oregon Eugene	Medford Oregon
Coos Bay Oregon	14 Sep 1969	Oregon Eugene	Willamette Valley Oregon
Corvallis Oregon	3 Nov 1963	Oregon Eugene	Willamette Valley Oregon
Eugene Oregon Santa Clara	17 Apr 1983	Oregon Eugene	Willamette Valley Oregon
Eugene Oregon	12 Sep 1976	Oregon Eugene	Willamette Valley Oregon
Forest Grove Oregon	20 May 2007	Oregon Salem	Portland Oregon
Grants Pass Oregon	31 Oct 1976	Oregon Eugene	Medford Oregon
Gresham Oregon	26 May 1974	Oregon Portland	Portland Oregon
Hermiston Oregon	26 Oct 1980	Washington Kennewick	Columbia River Washington
Hillsboro Oregon	12 Oct 1975	Oregon Portland	Portland Oregon
Keizer Oregon	8 Feb 1976	Oregon Salem	Portland Oregon
Klamath Falls Oregon	22 Mar 1953	Oregon Eugene	Medford Oregon
La Grande Oregon	9 Jun 1901	Idaho Boise	Columbia River Washington
Lake Oswego Oregon	29 Apr 1984	Oregon Portland	Portland Oregon
Lebanon Oregon	3 Feb 1980	Oregon Salem	Willamette Valley Oregon
McMinnville Oregon	25 Oct 1981	Oregon Salem	Portland Oregon
Monmouth Oregon	24 Aug 1980	Oregon Salem	Portland Oregon
Mount Hood Oregon	10 Oct 1982	Oregon Portland	Portland Oregon
Medford Oregon	23 Aug 1964	Oregon Eugene	Medford Oregon
Nyssa Oregon	8 Jan 1950	Idaho Boise	Meridian Idaho
Ontario Oregon	18 Nov 1984	Idaho Boise	Meridian Idaho
Oregon City	16 Jan 1972	Oregon Portland	Portland Oregon
Portland Oregon	26 Jun 1938	Oregon Portland	Portland Oregon
Rainier Oregon	8 Mar 1992	Washington Vancouver	Portland Oregon
Redmond Oregon	1 Mar 1981	Oregon Salem	Willamette Valley Oregon
Roseburg Oregon	15 May 1977	Oregon Eugene	Willamette Valley Oregon
Salem Oregon	22 Jan 1961	Oregon Salem	Portland Oregon
Springfield Oregon	2 Dec 1951	Oregon Eugene	Willamette Valley Oregon
The Dalles Oregon	26 Jun 1977	Washington Yakima	Portland Oregon
Tualatin Oregon	16 Aug 1992	Oregon Portland	Portland Oregon
Walla Walla Washington	11 Mar 1979	Washington Kennewick	Columbia River Washington

== Missions ==
On July 26, 1897, the Northwestern States Mission was organized to search out Latter-day Saints who had moved to Oregon and Washington. On June 10, 1970, its name changed to the Oregon Mission and ultimately the Oregon Portland Mission on June 20, 1974. On July 1, 1990, the Oregon Eugene Mission was organized; and in July 2013, the Oregon Salem Mission was organized.

Mission	Organized
Oregon Eugene Mission	July 1, 1990
Oregon Portland Mission	July 26, 1897
Oregon Salem Mission	July 1, 2013

In addition to these missions, the Idaho Boise Mission covers the eastern portion of the state while the Washington Kennewick, Washington Vancouver, and Washington Yakima missions cover portions of Northern Oregon.

== Notable Oregonian members ==
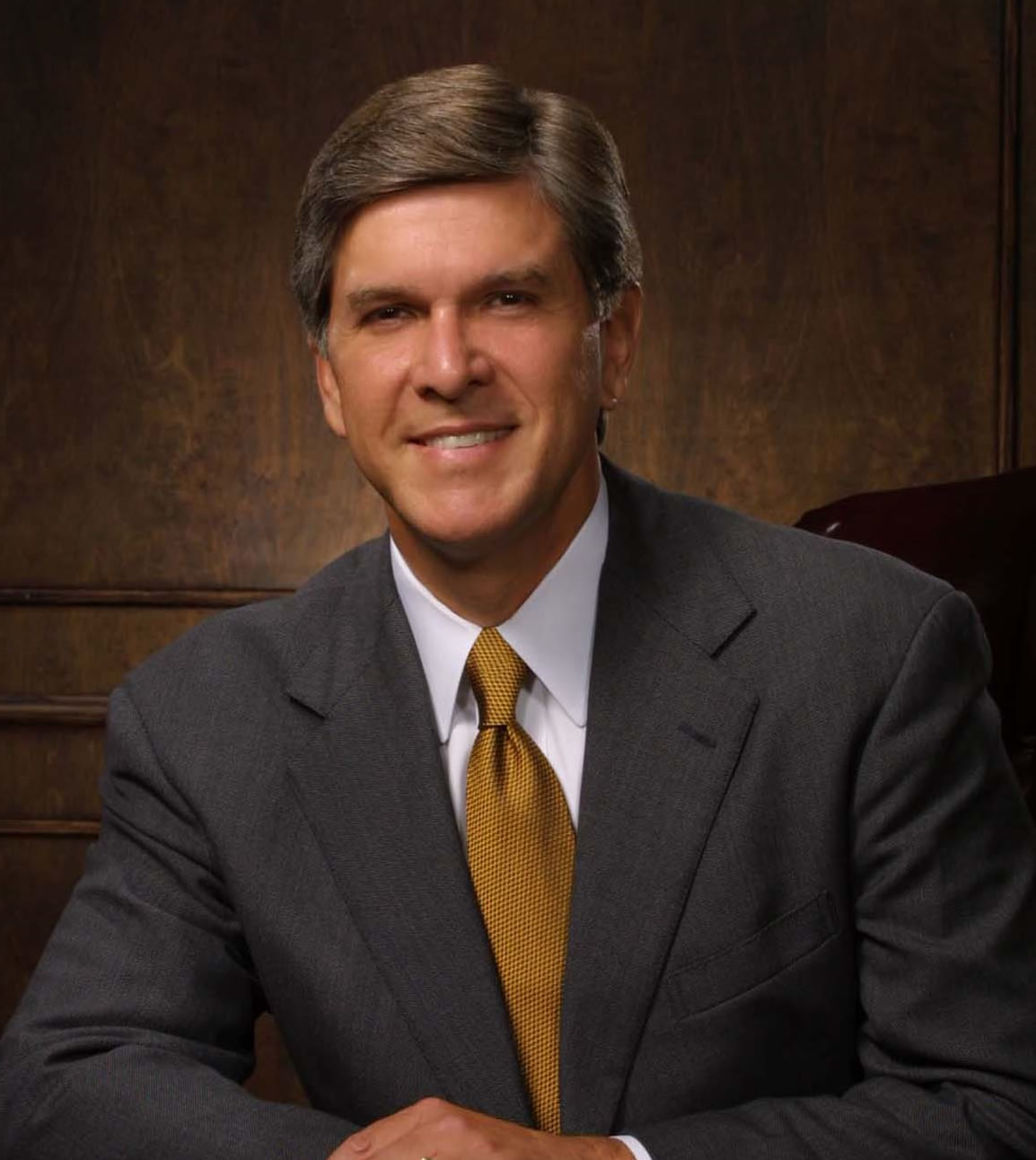
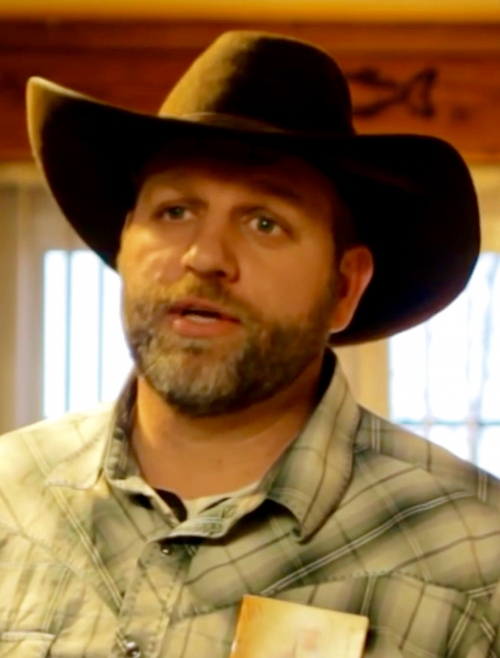
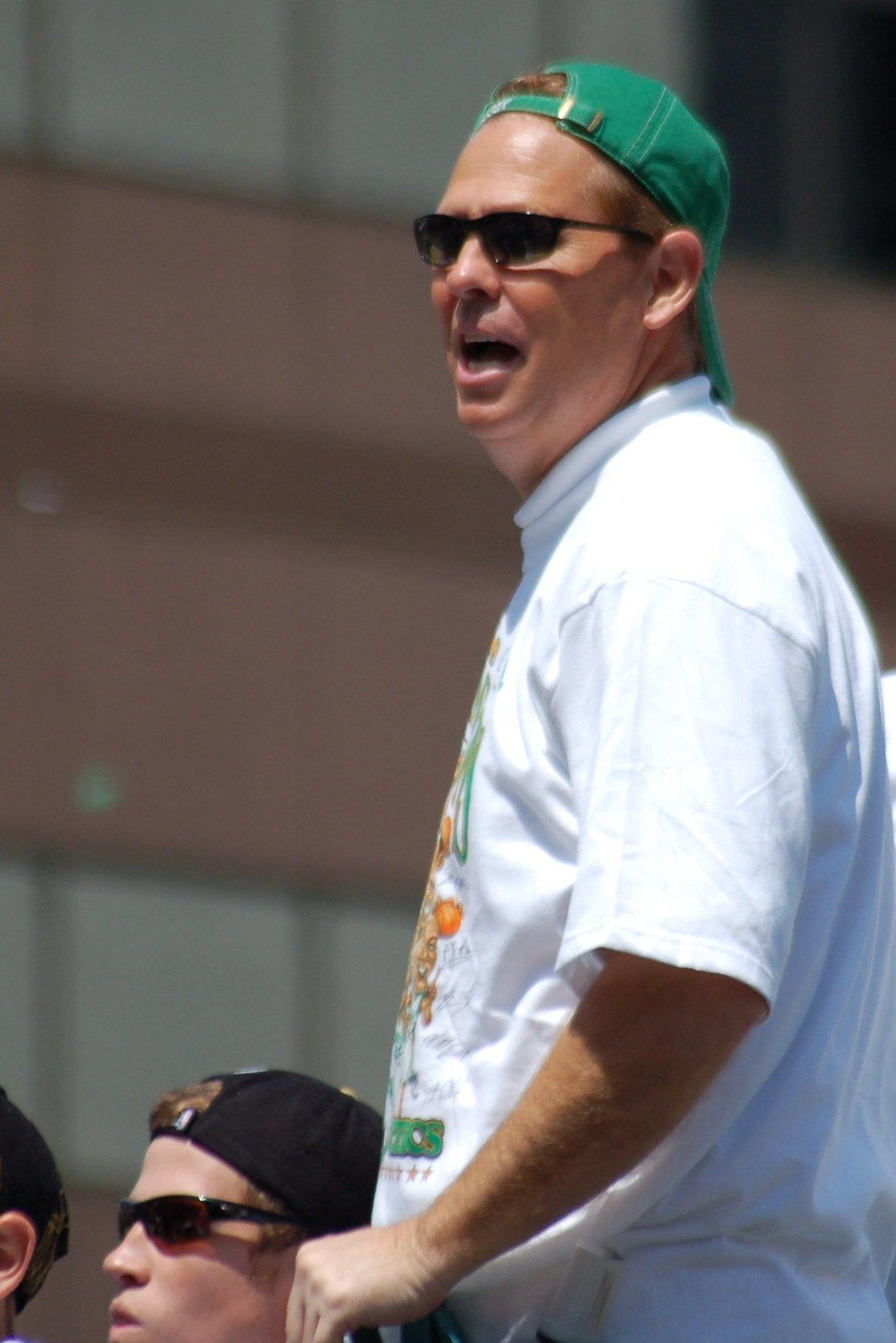
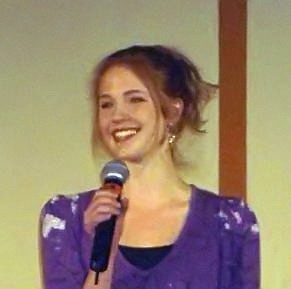
Senator Gordon H. Smith, Ammon Bundy, Danny Ainge, and Erin Chambers are examples of notable Saints from Oregon, showing the influence of the LDS Church in the state.

See Also: List of Latter Day Saints and Category:Latter Day Saints from Oregon

- Danny Ainge, Basketball player and executive
- Ammon Bundy, Activist and leader of the Malheur Wildlife Refuge Standoff
- Tom Butler, Former State Representative, (R-HD60)
- Erin Chambers, Actress
- Jacoby Ellsbury, Professional baseball player (Boston, New York - Yankees)
- Jeremy Guthrie, Professional baseball player (multiple teams)
- Shawn Lindsay, Former State Representative, (R-HD30)
- Dale Murphy, Professional baseball player (Atlanta, Philadelphia, Colorado)
- Dennis Richardson, Oregon Secretary of State (R), 2017–19
- Gordon H. Smith, US Senator (R), 1997–2009
- Rich Vial, Former Deputy Secretary of State, Nonpartisan candidate for Oregon Secretary of State in 2020

== Temples ==

Temples in and near Oregon
= Operating
= Under construction
= Announced
= Temporarily Closed

Oregon currently has two operating temples and one under construction. The Columbia River and Meridian Idaho temples serve portions of Eastern Oregon.

42. Portland Oregon Temple; Official website; News & images	
Location: Announced: Groundbreaking: Dedicated: Size: Style:	Lake Oswego, Oregon, United States; April 7, 1984 by Spencer W. Kimball; September 20, 1986 by Gordon B. Hinckley; August 19, 1989 by Gordon B. Hinckley; 80,500 sq ft (7,480 m^{2}) on a 7.3-acre (3.0 ha) site Modern, six-spire design - designed by Leland A. Gray
79. Medford Oregon Temple; Official website; News & images	
Location: Announced: Groundbreaking: Dedicated: Size: Style:	Central Point, Oregon, United States; March 15, 1999 by Gordon B. Hinckley; May 20, 1999 by D. Lee Tobler; April 16, 2000 by James E. Faust; 10,700 sq ft (990 m^{2}) on a 2-acre (0.81 ha) site Classic modern, single-spire design - designed by Dan Park, Church A&E Services, Joseph E. Marty, Architect
218. Willamette Valley Oregon Temple; Official website; News & images	
Location: Announced: Groundbreaking: Dedicated: Size: Notes:	Springfield, Oregon, U.S. 4 April 2021 by Russell M. Nelson; 29 October 2022 by Valeri V. Cordón; 7 June 2026 by Dieter F. Uchtdorf; 30,635 sq ft (2,846.1 m^{2}) on a 10.29-acre (4.16 ha) site Official name, anticipated size, location, and exterior rendering released on September 2, 2021.

== Gallery ==
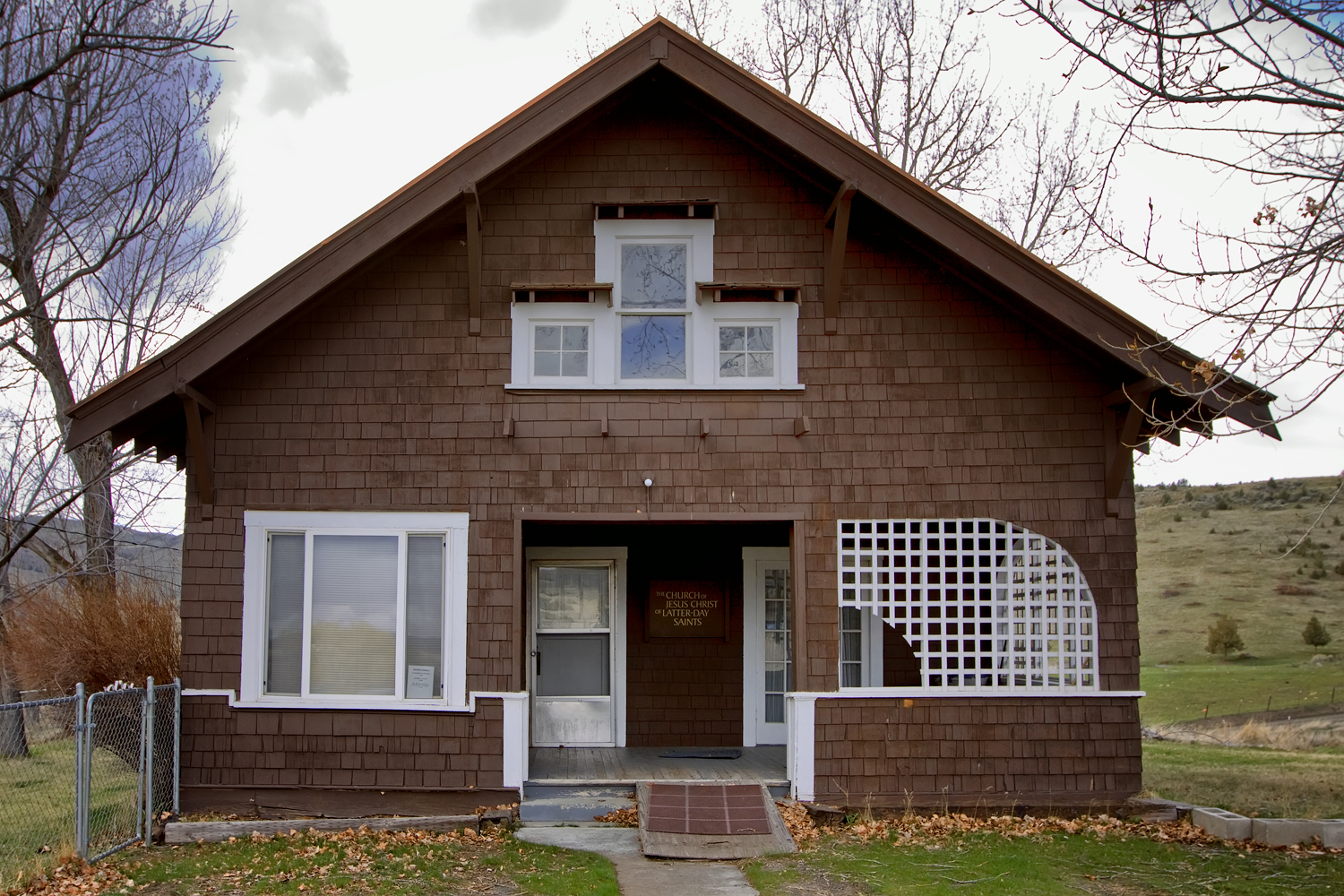
An LDS chapel in Fossil.

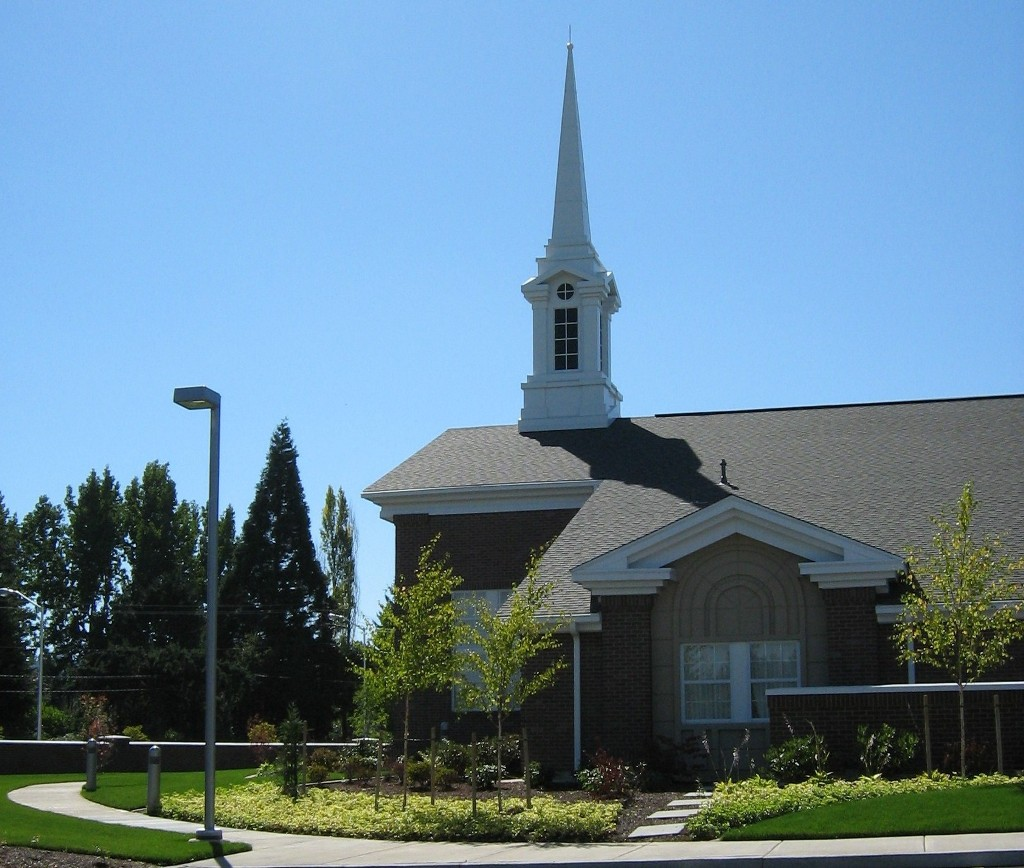
A contemporary LDS chapel in Beaverton.

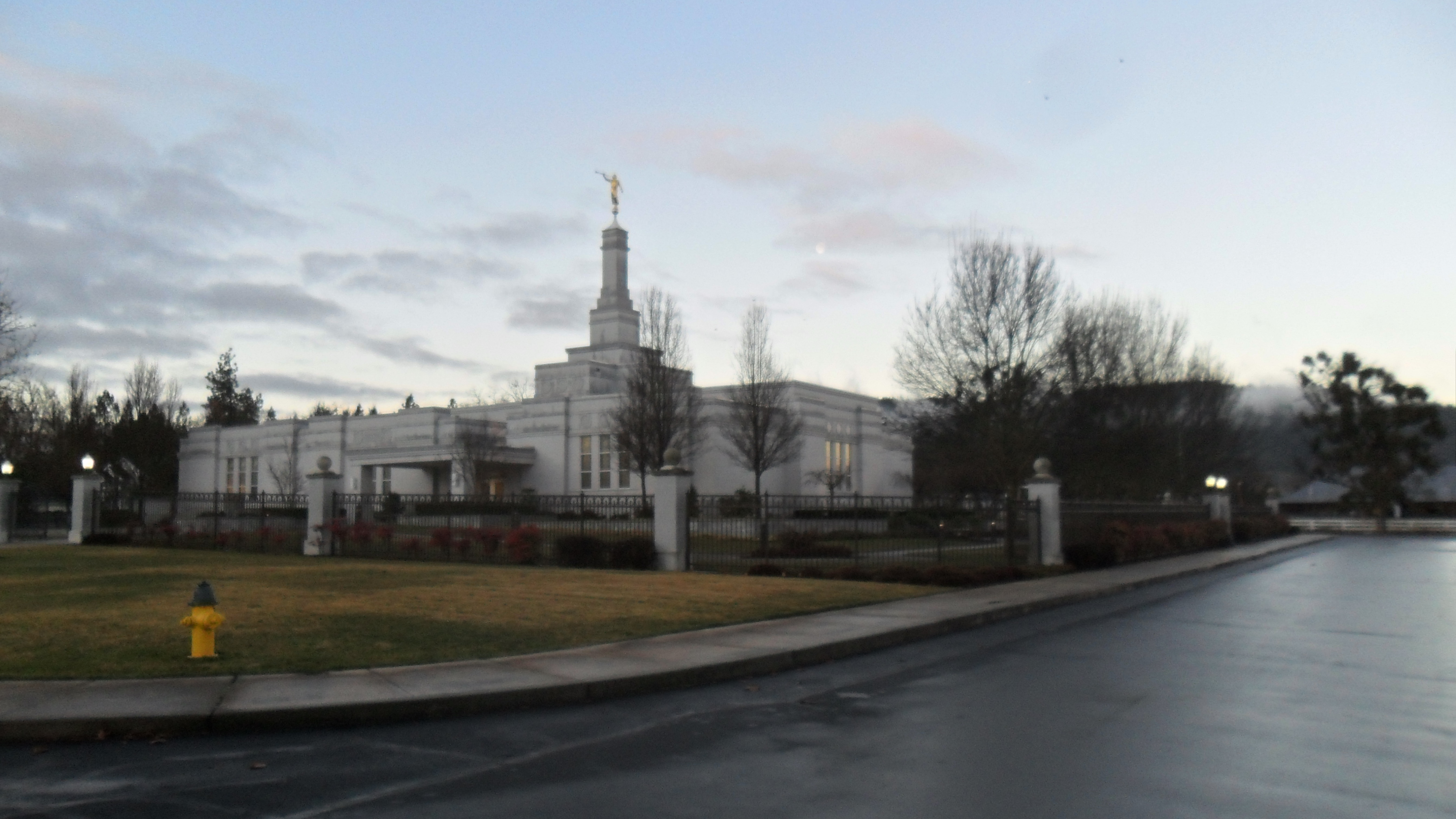
The Medford Oregon Temple.

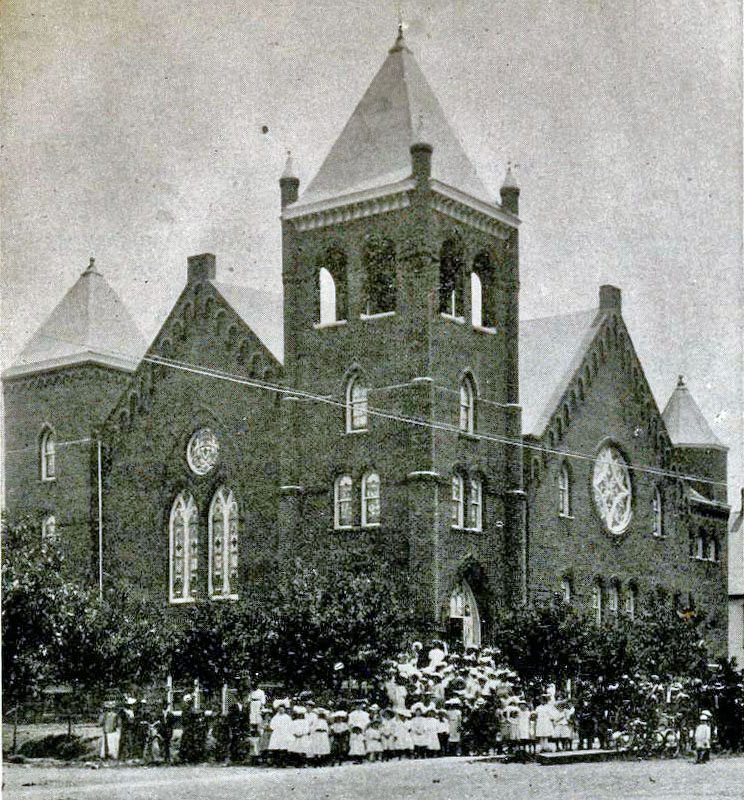
The Union Stake Tabernacle in La Grande.

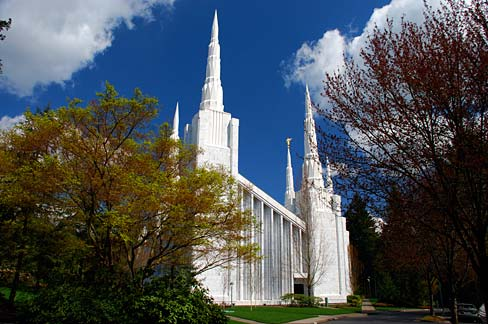
The Portland Oregon Temple.

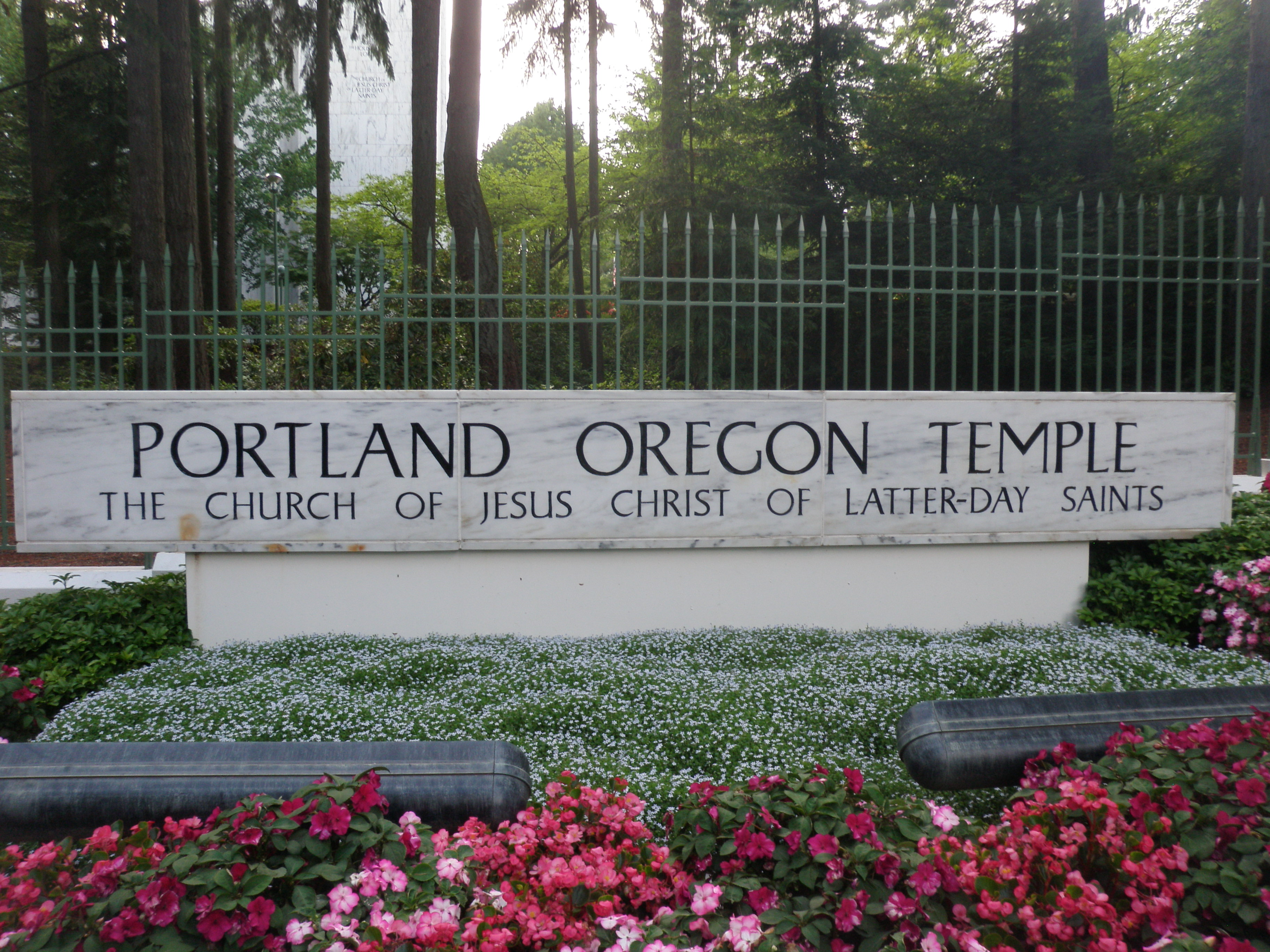
The sign to the Portland Oregon Temple.

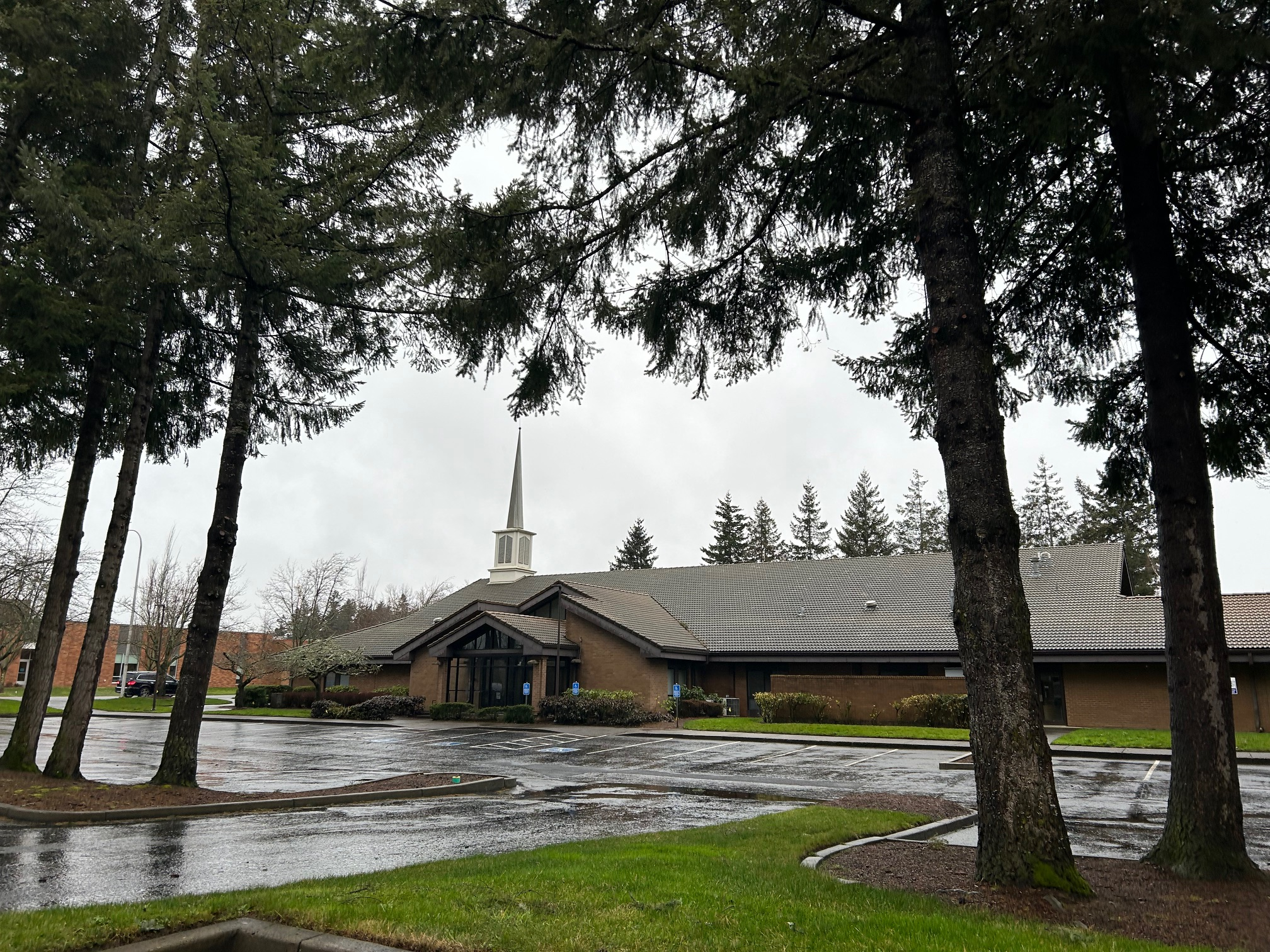
An LDS Meetinghouse in Troutdale

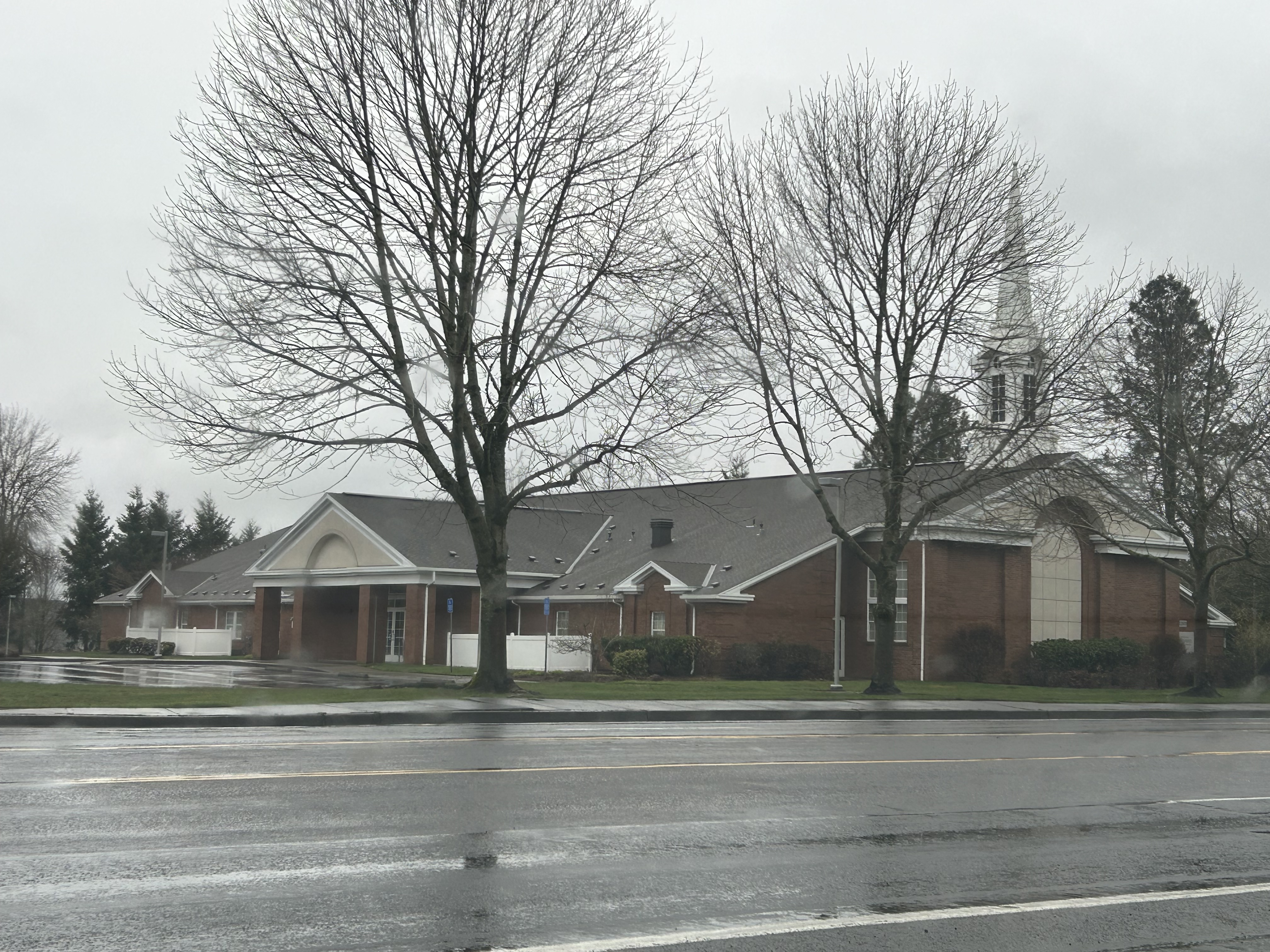
An LDS Meetinghouse in Gresham

== See also ==
- The Church of Jesus Christ of Latter-day Saints membership statistics (United States)
- Religion in Oregon
- Religion in Portland, Oregon
