= Portland Stake Tabernacle =

Historic church in Portland, Oregon

Portland Stake Tabernacle (Church of Jesus Christ of Latter-day Saints)
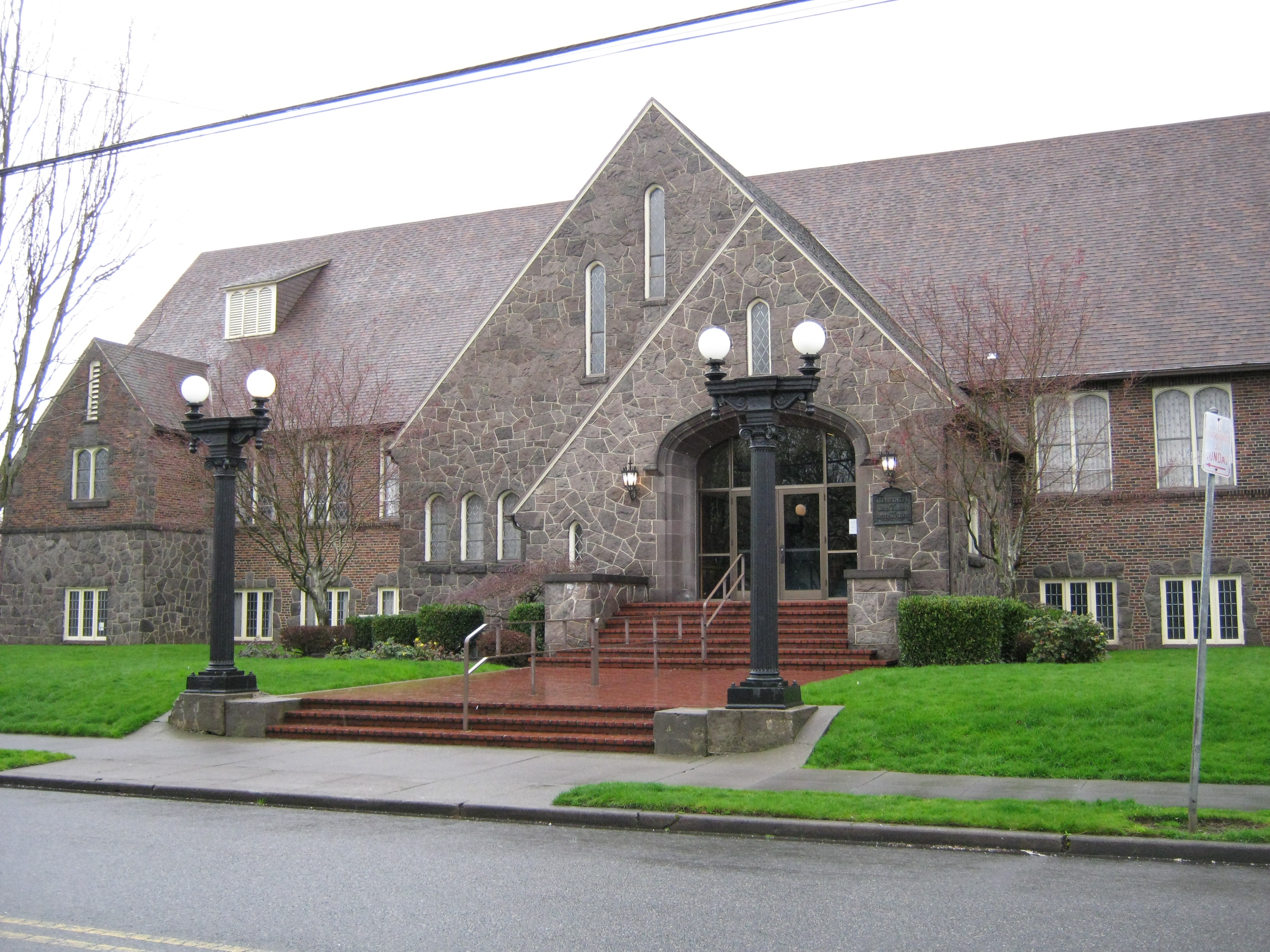

- Location in Portland, Oregon

Religion
- Affiliation: The Church of Jesus Christ of Latter-day Saints
- Ecclesiastical or organisational status: Meetinghouse/Church (1928 – 2019); Family History Center (2019 – 2022); Church event space (from 2022)

Location
- Location: 2931 SE Harrison Street, Richmond, Portland, Oregon
- Country: United States
- Coordinates: 45.5087°N 122.6354°W

Architecture
- Architect: Charles Kaufman
- Type: Church
- Style: Gothic Revival
- Groundbreaking: August 25, 1928
- Completed: 1929; 97 years ago

Specifications
- Direction of façade: South
- Capacity: 2,000
- Church of Jesus Christ of Latter Day Saints
- Oregon Historic Site
- Portland Significant Resource

The Portland Stake Tabernacle, (also known as the Portland First Ward Meetinghouse and the Colonial Heights Building), is a historic church building for The Church of Jesus Christ of Latter-day Saints located in the Richmond neighborhood of Portland, Oregon. The building is designated as an Oregon Historic Site and as a Significant Resource by the Portland Historic Landmarks Commission.

George Wesley Bowers, one of the builders of the Tabernacle, is known for his nearby house.

== Building ==
The 26,222 square foot meetinghouse seats over 2,000. The adjoining parking lot combined make the entire property 43,082 square feet. As of 2022, the property has a market value of $11.4 million.

== History ==
In 1915, Hyrum Pope and Harold W. Burton designed a prairie school style meetinghouse on SE 25th and Madison. By 1928, Latter-day Saints in Portland outgrew this building. The plot for the Portland Stake Tabernacle was purchased and the cornerstone was laid on August 25, 1928. The tabernacle was designed by architect Charles E. Kaufman.

The tabernacle was first used on the same day the old meetinghouse was sold to the Reorganized Church of Jesus Christ of Latter-day Saints (now the Community of Christ) in early February 1929. The old meetinghouse is now a Buddhist place of worship. The tabernacle was dedicated on February 18, 1929 with Anthony W. Ivins and Charles W. Nibley of the Church's First Presidency in attendance.

Apostle LeGrand Richards served as President of the Portland Branch in the tabernacle, and it has received multiple visits from Apostles and president of the Church David O. McKay.

The building was used as a meetinghouse until 2019 and as a Family History Center, providing Genealogy resources to the public, until 2022. The building is currently used only for Church events and occasional tours.

== Gallery ==
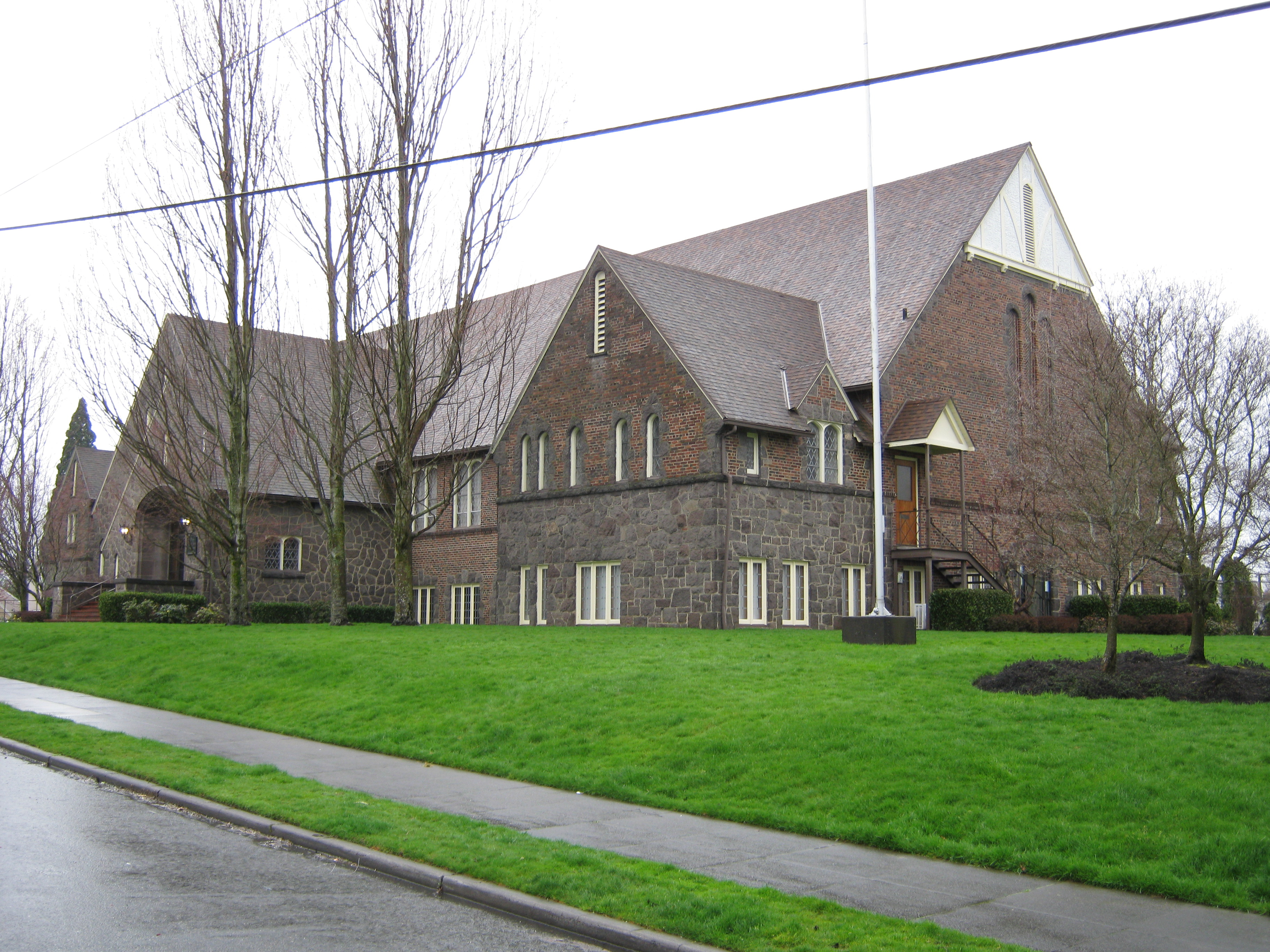
From the Southeast

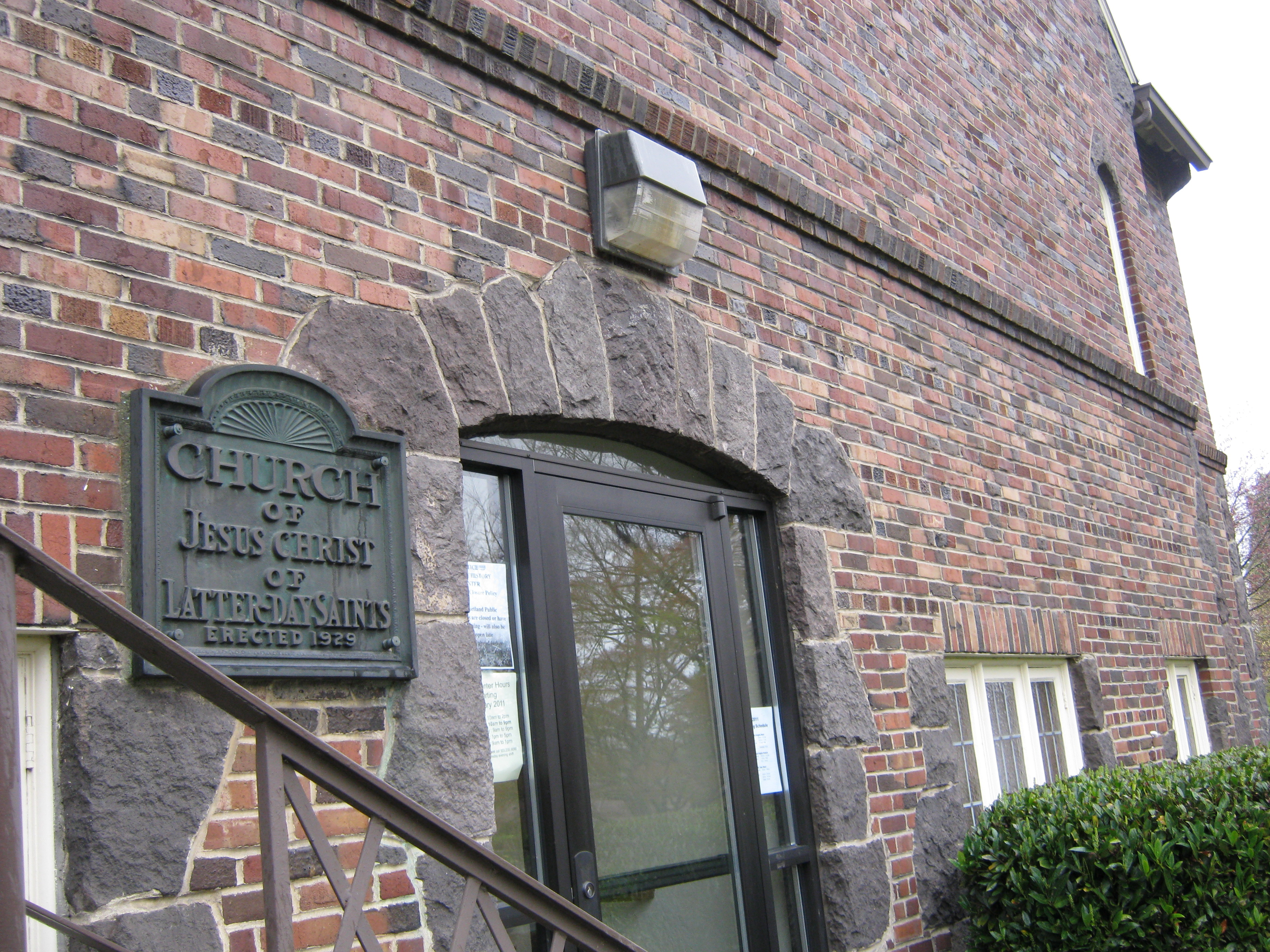
East entrance

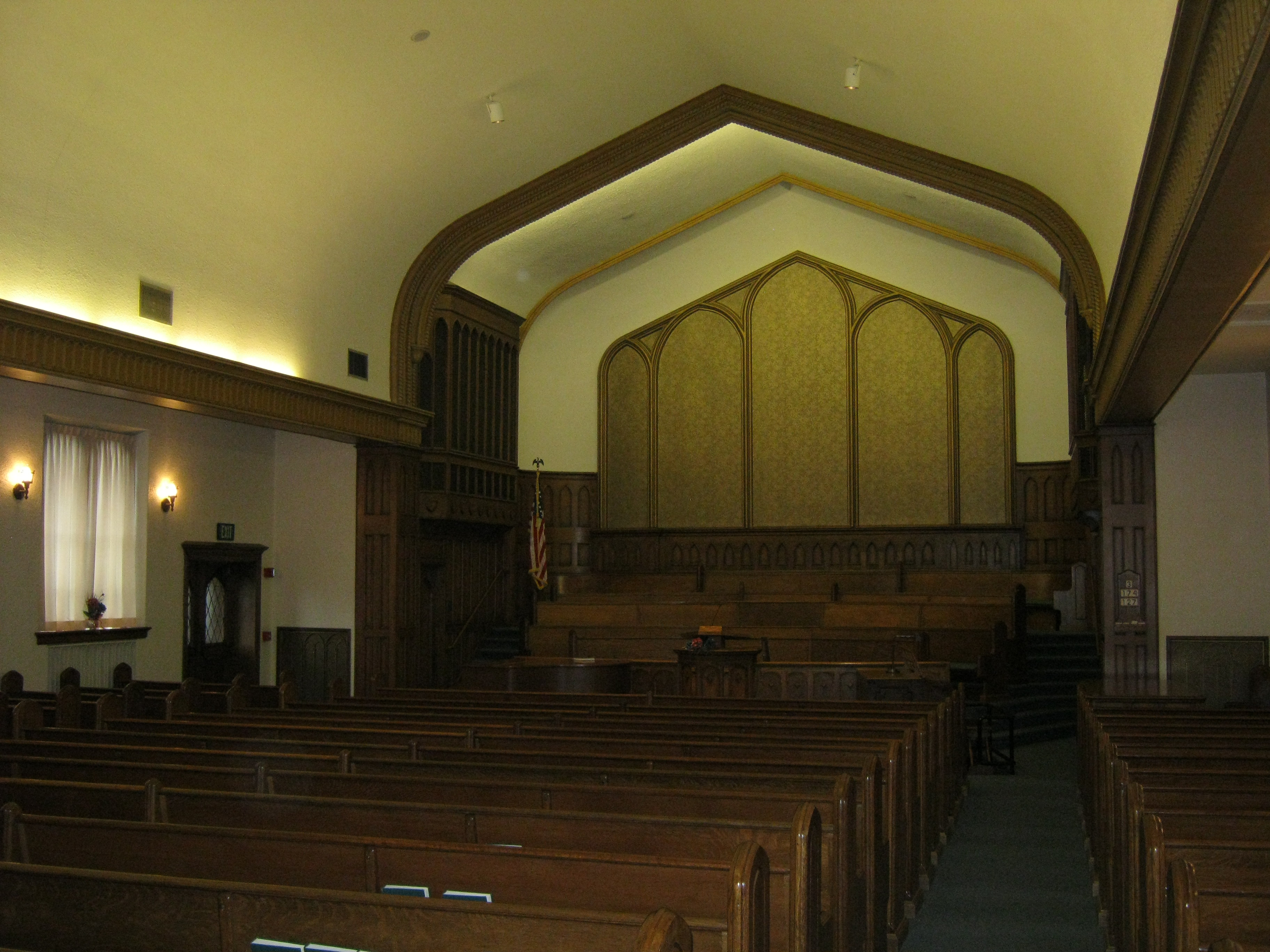
The chapel

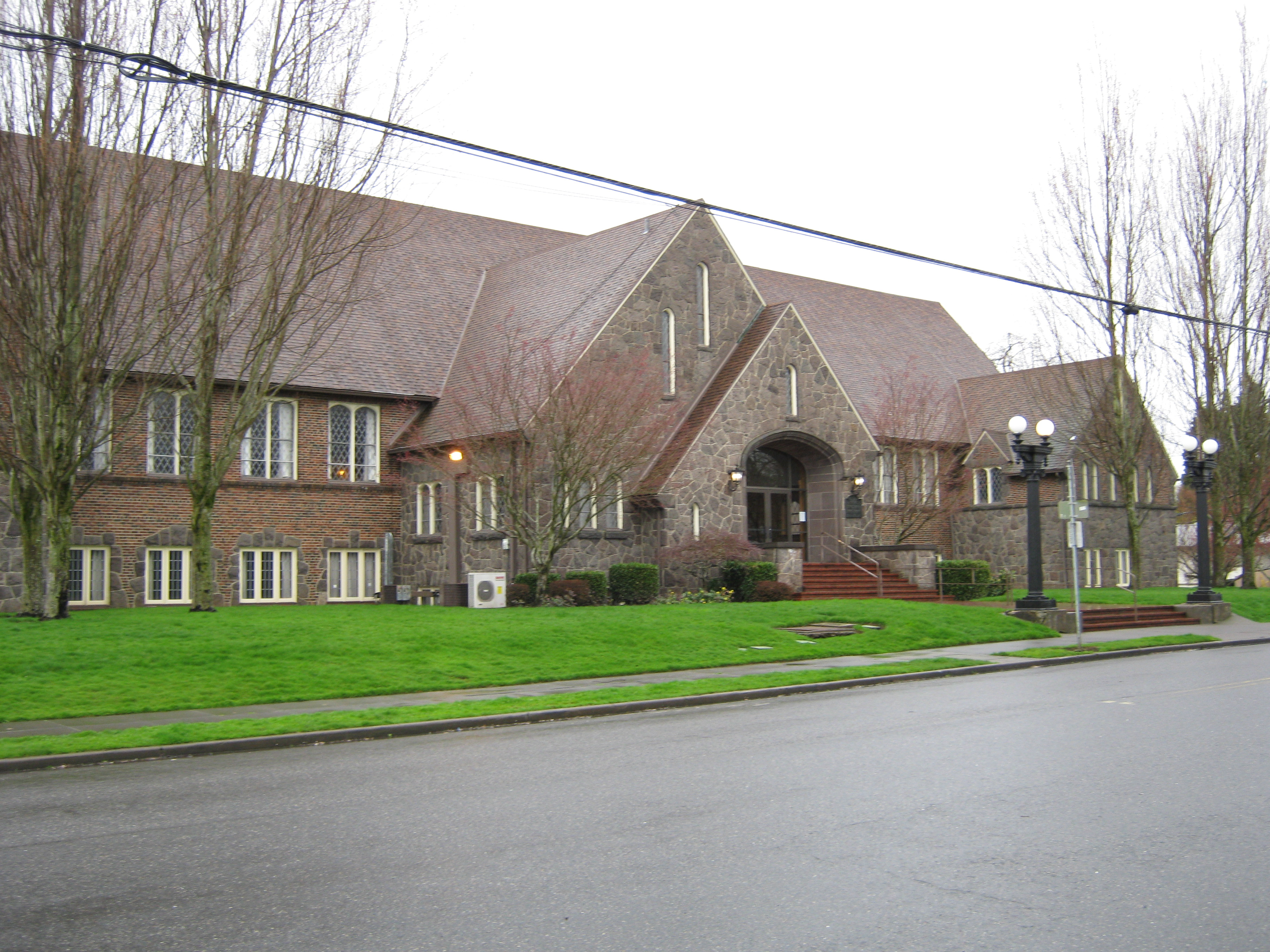
From the southwest

== See also ==
- The Church of Jesus Christ of Latter-day Saints in Oregon
- Religion in Portland, Oregon
