= George W. and Hetty A. Bowers House =

Historic building in Portland, Oregon, U.S.

- U.S. National Register of Historic Places
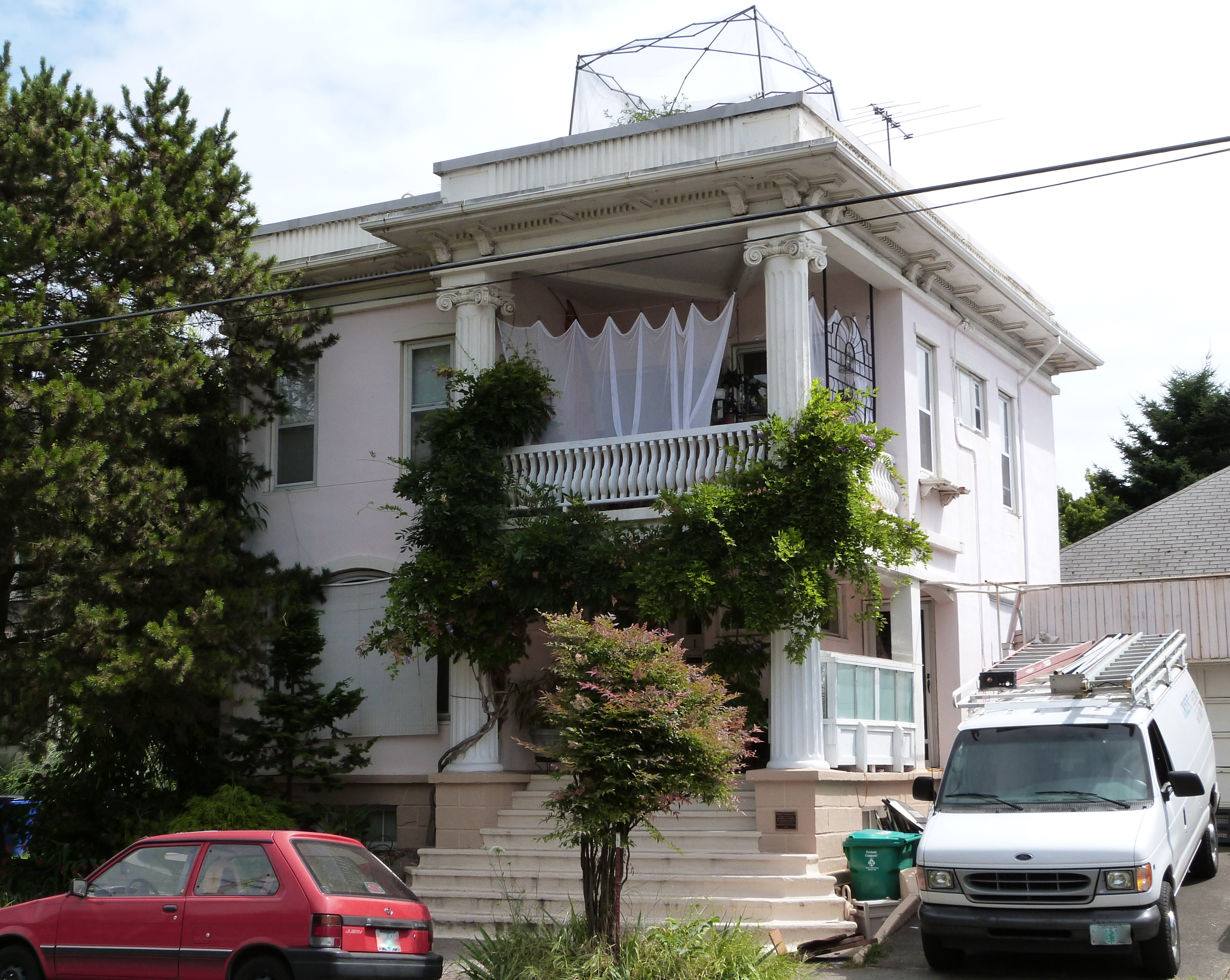
- The Bowers House in 2012

- Location within the United States Location within Oregon Location within Portland, Oregon
- Location: 114 NE 22nd Avenue; Portland, Oregon
- Coordinates: 45°31′26″N 122°38′36″W
- Built: 1910
- Architectural style: Classical Revival
- NRHP reference No.: 11000702
- Added to NRHP: September 23, 2011

The George W. and Hetty A. Bowers House is a historic residence located in the Kerns neighborhood of Portland, Oregon, United States. The finest of only three poured-concrete houses in Portland, this 1910 residence was built at the height of the short-lived national trend of experimentation with this building method. Although the method largely died out soon after and especially never gained popularity in Portland, this house was at the cutting edge in its time.

The house was entered on the National Register of Historic Places in 2011.

George Bowers was a prominent Latter-day Saint Elder and helped with the construction of the Portland Stake Tabernacle.

== See also ==
- National Register of Historic Places listings in Northeast Portland, Oregon
