= W. Craig Zwick =

American religious leader

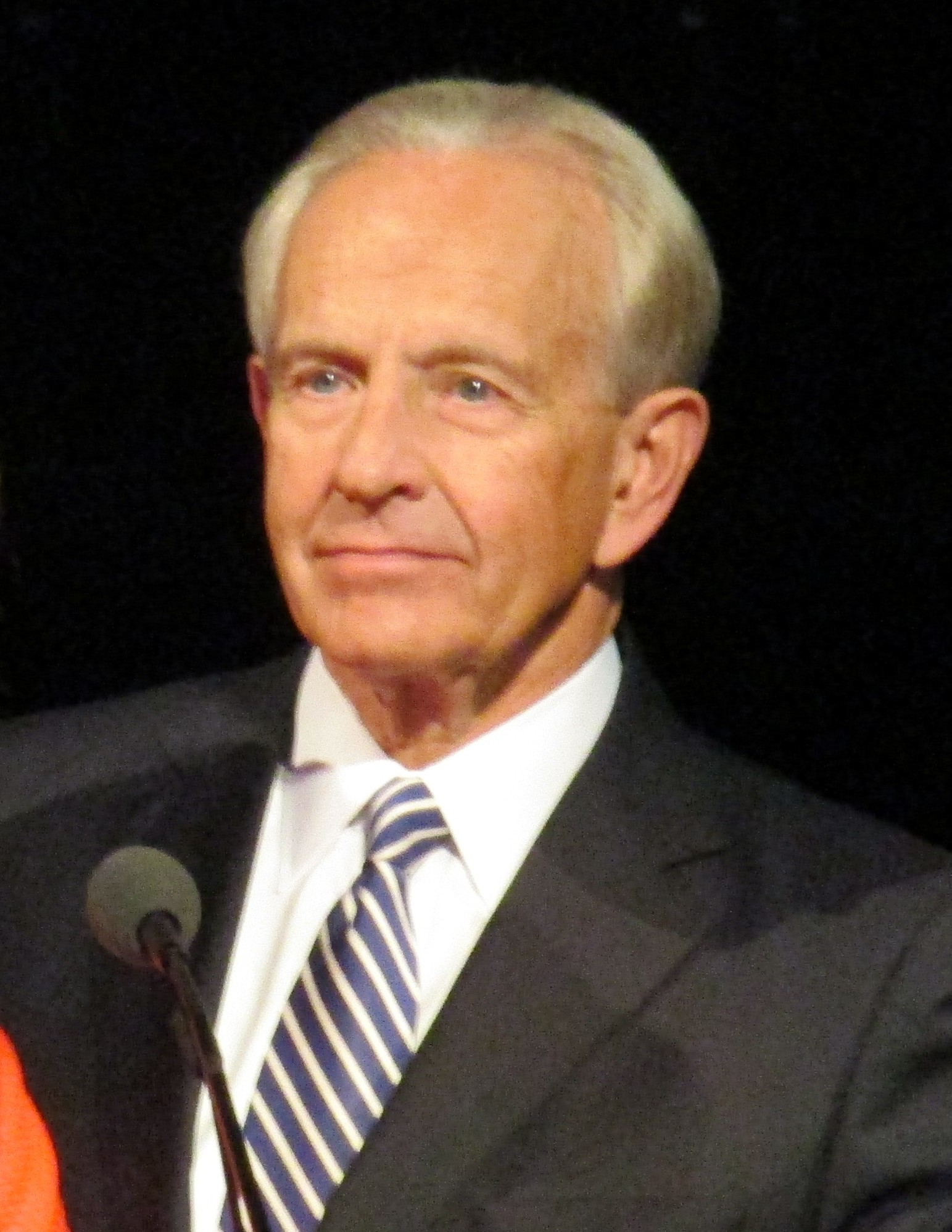
- W. Craig Zwick in 2018

First Quorum of the Seventy
- April 1, 1995 – September 30, 2017
- Called by: Gordon B. Hinckley
- End reason: Became emeritus general authority

Emeritus General Authority
- September 30, 2017
- Called by: Thomas S. Monson

Personal details
- Born: William Craig Zwick; June 30, 1947 (age 77); Salt Lake City, Utah, United States

William Craig Zwick (born June 30, 1947) has been a general authority of the Church of Jesus Christ of Latter-day Saints (LDS Church) since 1995. Zwick was born in Salt Lake City, Utah. He received a degree in business management and finance from the University of Utah.

== Career ==
Zwick started working for his father's construction company, Zwick Construction Inc., and eventually became the owner and operator. They built many hospitals and schools. The company also frequently performed construction jobs for the LDS Church. These projects included the Family History Library, the South Visitors Center on Temple Square, the Museum of Church History and Art, and the Portland Oregon Temple. He also worked for three years as executive director of the Utah Department of Transportation.

== LDS Church service ==
He served as a missionary for the LDS Church in Argentina. Richard G. Scott of the Quorum of the Twelve was one of Zwick's mission presidents. While serving on this mission he worked on his first LDS Church chapel construction project. Prior to his call as a general authority, Zwick served as president of the church's Chile Santiago South Mission. Since becoming a general authority, he has served as president of the church's Brazil, Brazil South, and North America Northeast areas. He has also served in the presidencies of the Europe West and Europe Central areas. In 2011, he was appointed an Assistant Executive Director of both the church's Missionary and Correlation departments. In 2014, he served temporarily as president of the Puerto Rico San Juan Mission. On September 30, 2017, Zwick was released and designated an emeritus general authority. He gave his final address in General Conference the following day.

== Family ==
Zwick married Janet Johnson and they are the parents of four children. In an interview, Zwick said his maternal ancestors go "back in church history to Hyrum [Smith]." One of his children, Spencer, served with Mitt Romney in Massachusetts and then on Romney's 2012 presidential campaign as national finance chair. Zwick was criticized for allegedly using his LDS Church email account to solicit donations to Romney's campaign.
