= Medford Oregon Temple =

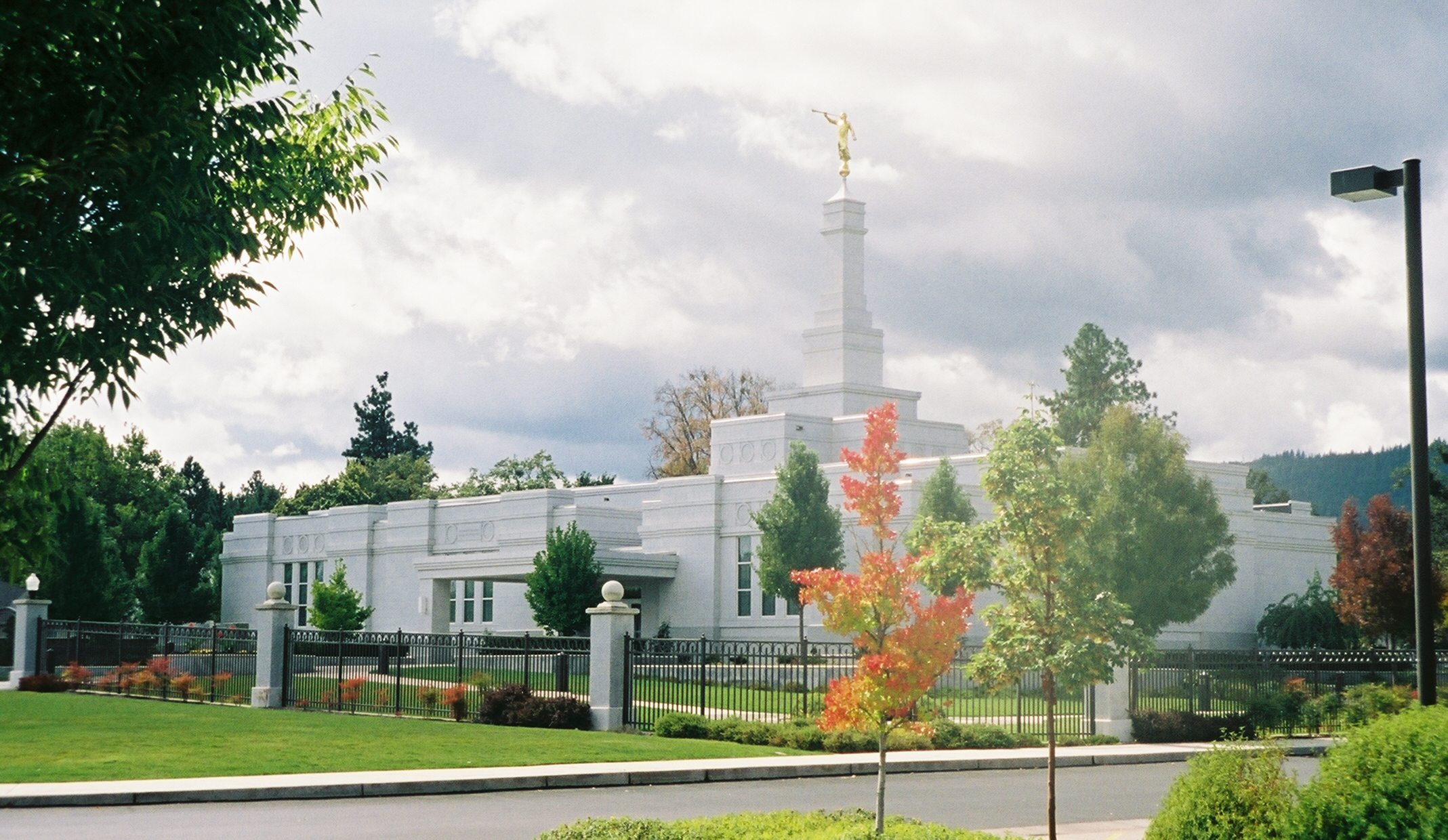
- Interactive map of Medford Oregon Temple
- Number: 79
- Dedication: April 16, 2000, by James E. Faust
- Site: 2 acres (0.81 ha)
- Floor area: 10,700 ft^{2} (990 m^{2})
- Height: 71 ft (22 m)
- Official website • News & images

Church chronology
← Fresno California Temple	Medford Oregon Temple	→ Memphis Tennessee Temple

Additional information
- Announced: March 15, 1999, by Gordon B. Hinckley
- Groundbreaking: May 20, 1999, by D. Lee Tobler
- Open house: March 24–31, 2000
- Current president: Kelly E Thompson
- Designed by: Dan Park, Church A&E Services, Joseph E. Marty, Architect
- Location: Central Point, Oregon, United States
- Coordinates: 42°22′23.96639″N 122°55′57.88559″W
- Exterior finish: Gray granite quarried from Mount Airy, North Carolina
- Design: Classic modern, single-spire design
- Baptistries: 1
- Ordinance rooms: 2 (two-stage progressive)
- Sealing rooms: 2

The Medford Oregon Temple is the 79th operating temple of the Church of Jesus Christ of Latter-day Saints.

The intent to build the temple was announced on March 15, 1999, by the church's First Presidency. It was the state's second, after the Portland Oregon Temple. It is located midway between the Oakland California and Portland Oregon temples. As of 2010 it served nine stakes in northern California and Oregon.

== History ==
The temple was announced by the First Presidency on March 15, 1999, in a letter to local church leaders. A groundbreaking ceremony, marking the commencement of construction, was held on May 20, 1999, with D. Lee Tobler, a general authority presiding, with local church members and community leaders attending.

After construction was completed, the church announced on February 19, 2000 the public open house that was held from March 24-25 and 27-31, 2000. During the open house nearly 35,000 people toured the building, James E. Faust, second counselor in the First Presidency, dedicated the Medford Oregon Temple on April 16, 2000.

== Design and architecture ==
Designed by Dan Park and church architectural services, it uses a traditional Latter-day Saint temple design and reflects both the cultural heritage of the area and its spiritual significance to the church.

The temple is on a 2-acre plot, is 77 feet tall, and is constructed with gray granite quarried from Mount Airy, North Carolina. The temple has a total floor area of 10,700 square feet and includes two endowment rooms, two sealing rooms, and a baptistry.

The design uses elements representing Latter-day Saint symbolism, to provide deeper meaning to its appearance and function. Symbolism is important to church members and includes a statue of the angel Moroni on the steeple, which represents “the restoration of the gospel of Jesus Christ.”

== Temple presidents ==
The church's temples are directed by a temple president and matron, each typically serving for a term of three years. The president and matron oversee the administration of temple operations and provide guidance and training for both temple patrons and staff.

Serving from 2000 to 2004, the first president was Richard M. Ericson, with Kathleen M. Ericson as matron. As of 2025, Kenneth B. Brinkerhoff is the president, with Kim R. Brinkerhoff serving as matron.

== Admittance ==
In February 2000, the church announced the public open house that was held on March 24-25 and 27-31, 2000. The temple was dedicated by James E. Faust on April 16, 2000, in four sessions.

Like all the church's temples, it is not used for Sunday worship services. To members of the church, temples are regarded as sacred houses of the Lord. Once dedicated, only church members with a current temple recommend can enter for worship.

== See also ==

Temples in and near Oregon
= Operating
= Under construction
= Announced
= Temporarily Closed

- The Church of Jesus Christ of Latter-day Saints in Oregon
- Comparison of temples of The Church of Jesus Christ of Latter-day Saints
- List of temples of The Church of Jesus Christ of Latter-day Saints
- List of temples of The Church of Jesus Christ of Latter-day Saints by geographic region
- Temple architecture (Latter-day Saints)
