= Portland Oregon Temple =

Building in Oregon, United States

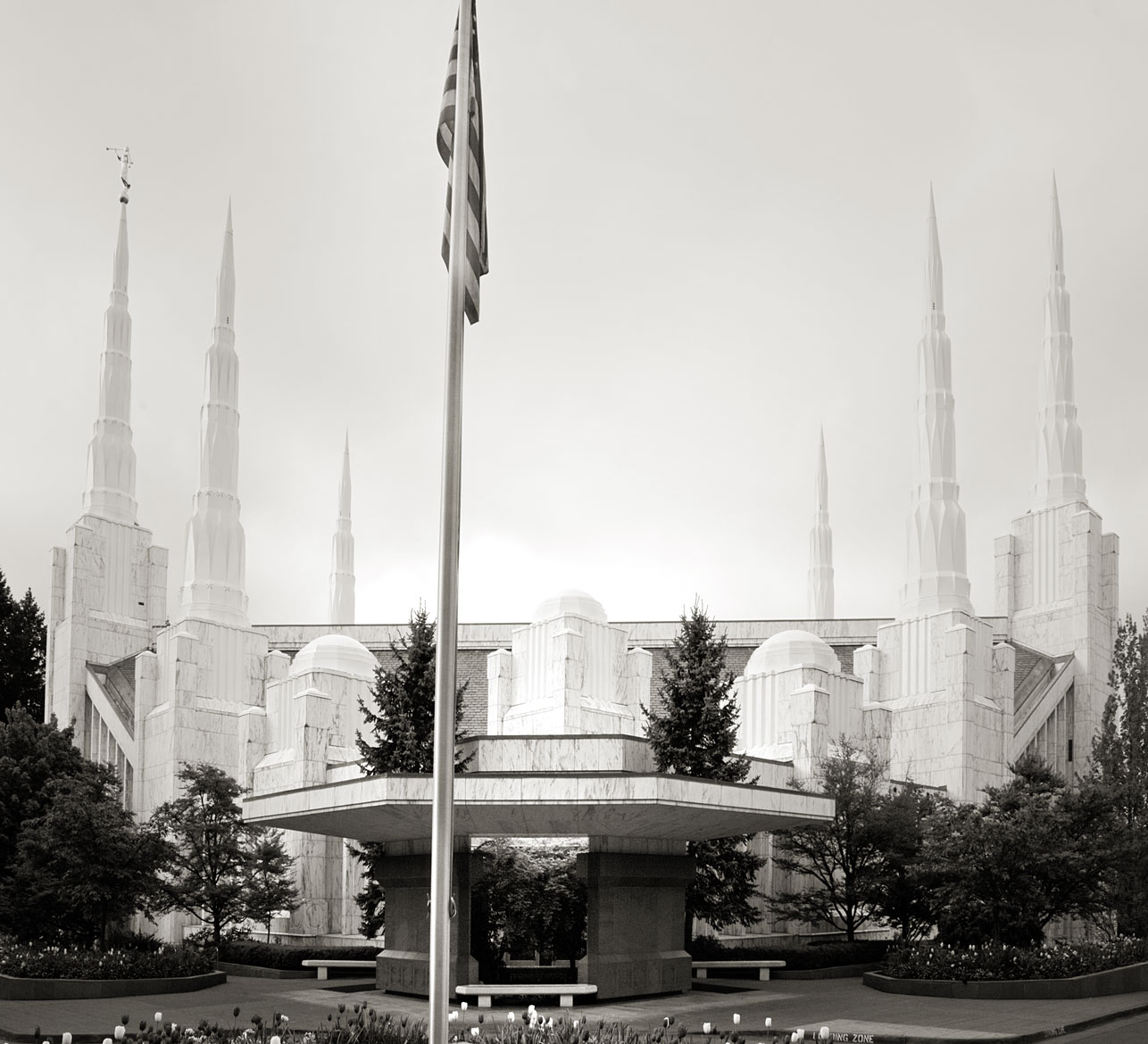
- Interactive map of Portland Oregon Temple
- Number: 42
- Dedication: August 19, 1989, by Gordon B. Hinckley
- Site: 7.3 acres (3.0 ha)
- Floor area: 80,500 ft^{2} (7,480 m^{2})
- Height: 181 ft (55 m)
- Official website • News & images

Church chronology
← Frankfurt Germany Temple	Portland Oregon Temple	→ Las Vegas Nevada Temple

Additional information
- Announced: April 7, 1984, by Spencer W. Kimball
- Groundbreaking: September 20, 1986, by Gordon B. Hinckley
- Open house: June 15 – July 8, 1989
- Designed by: Leland A. Gray
- Location: Lake Oswego, Oregon, United States
- Coordinates: 45°25′31.24200″N 122°44′32.00639″W
- Exterior finish: White Vermont marble walls with green Vermont slate roof
- Design: Modern, six-spire design
- Baptistries: 1
- Ordinance rooms: 4 (stationary)
- Sealing rooms: 14
- Clothing rental: Yes
- Visitors' center: Yes

The Portland Oregon Temple is a temple of the Church of Jesus Christ of Latter-day Saints (LDS Church) located on 7 acres (28,000 m^{2}) of land near the intersection of Highway 217 and I-5 in Lake Oswego, Oregon. The intent to build the temple was announced on April 7, 1984 by church president Spencer W. Kimball, during the church's general conference. Dedicated in 1989, the Portland Oregon Temple was the church's first temple in Oregon and the 42nd in the church. Prior to its dedication by Gordon B. Hinckley, over 314,000 people attended the public open house.

== History ==
The temple was dedicated in 1989 by Gordon B. Hinckley and was the church's first in Oregon, with the Medford Oregon Temple completed in 2000. The temple serves members in the Portland metropolitan area, other parts of Oregon, and cities in Washington. In 1988, during its construction, the church stated it had 90,000 members and was the second largest denomination (behind the Roman Catholic Church) in the area .

University of New Mexico historian, Ferenc Morton Szasz, places the structure in a group of Post-World War II temples built in the western American States, calling the group of temples "the most impressive religious structures of the entire western postwar building boom."

The church's acquisition of the property in Lake Oswego in the 1960s marked the beginning of a transformative journey. Initially intended for a junior college, two decades later, church leaders decided to repurpose the site as the location for the temple. The announcement on April 7, 1984, of the intent to construct the temple set the stage for a property development process that faced early opposition. The approval process included at least 27 public hearings, eight lawsuits, and four petition drives intended to stop development.

The groundbreaking ceremony, to signify beginning of construction, was attended by local church members and community leaders, was held on September 20, 1986, with Hinckley, then a member of the First Presidency, presiding.

The temple was dedicated on August 19, 1989 by Hinckley. In 1994, the Royal Rosarians of Portland, Oregon awarded the temple first place for commercial rose plantings. In 2020, like the church's other temples, the temple was closed in response to the coronavirus pandemic.

== Construction and challenges ==
In addition to the difficulties faced during the approval process for the temple, the construction process faced various challenges. These included a demanding schedule, coordination intricacies, and the sensitivity of working in the neighborhood. The supersaturated soil required a redesign of the foundation, and the church hired an arborist to protect the trees during construction. W. Craig Zwick, a church general authority with a construction background, played a role as the general contractor for the temple.

Before the dedication ceremony, the temple had a symbolic cornerstone placed in a recess, a capsule that contained scriptures, photographs, historical records, artifacts, and items related to the church in the area.

== Design and architecture ==
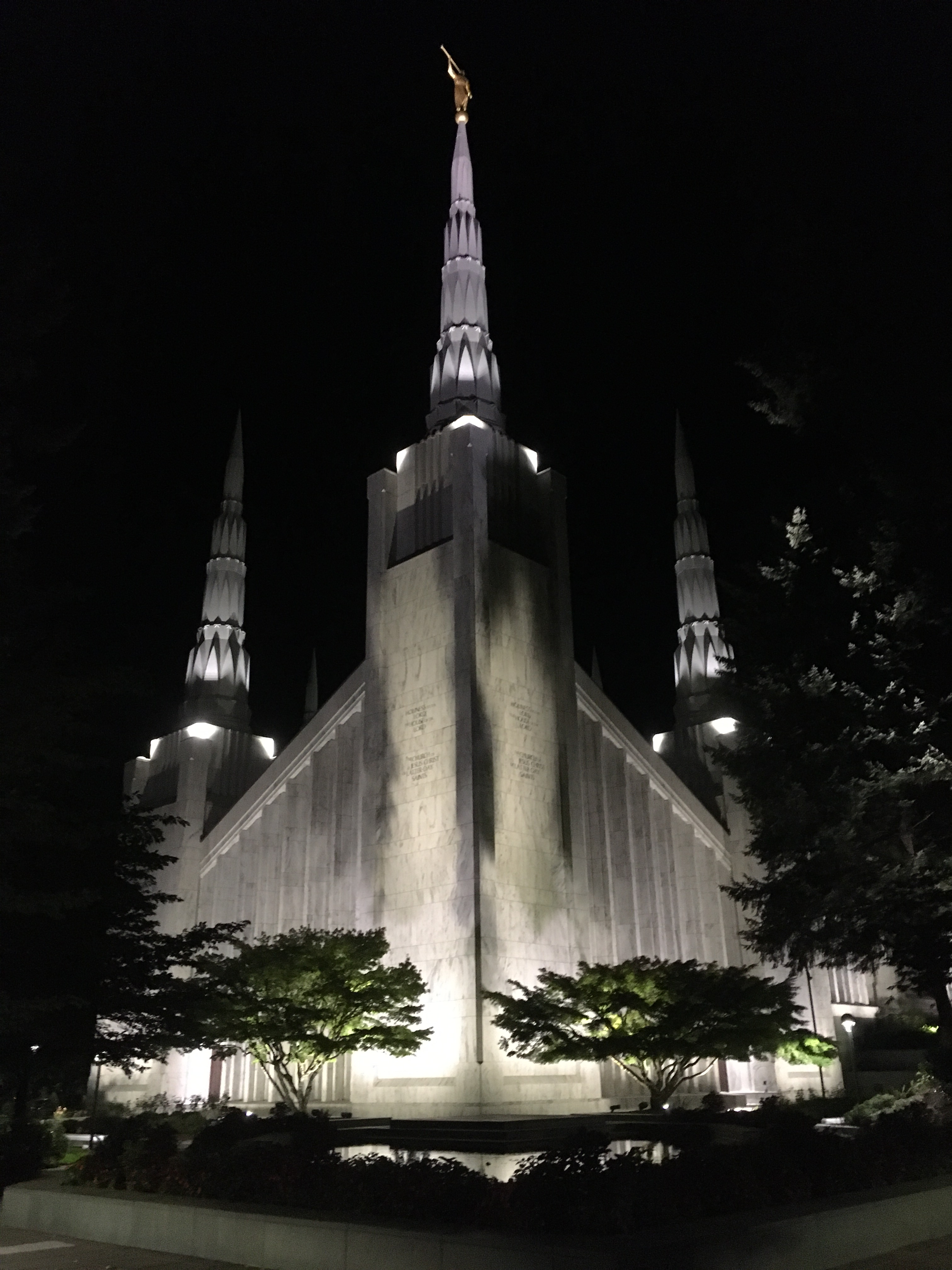
The Portland Oregon Temple at night

The temple uses marble walls, with a tower design with six spires, meant to be a symbol pointing to heaven, against the backdrop of the forest. The tallest spire goes to 170 feet, adding to 183 ft, including the 13 foot statue of the angel Moroni on the top (which is meant to represent the spreading of the gospel). The statue of Moroni is covered in a gold leaf. The 65,000 square foot building has 127 rooms, with the original design featuring a cafeteria, nursery, and baptistry. The total cost of the building was $22 million, with all costs set aside before construction began. Funding was raised in part by local members, with the rest funded by tithing. The temple's design has been compared to a medieval castle. The temple has the second highest number of sealing rooms of the church's temples (with 14), behind the Jordan River Utah Temple (with 17). The interior has a skylit atrium in the foyer, and uses mahogany woodwork throughout the interior.

The architect of the Portland Oregon Temple was Leland A. Gray, who also worked on the designs of the Manhattan New York Temple, Dallas Texas, Johannesburg South Africa, Stockholm Sweden, and Abba Nigeria temples, among others. The building has modern features coupled with traditional Latter-day Saint temple designs, reflecting both the cultural heritage of Portland and the spiritual significance of the church.

Site

The temple was constructed on a 7.3 acres (3.0 ha) property located about 10 miles south of Portland. The preliminary plans called for a three-story structure of 80,500 square feet. The landscaping around the temple features gardens, large trees, fountains, and reflective pools with walkways that surround the temple. There is also a visitors' center on the grounds where individuals can read materials, watch videos, and participate in exhibits which teach about Jesus Christ. These elements are provide a peaceful setting aimed to enhance the site's sacred atmosphere.

Exterior

The temple is constructed with white Vermont marble. The exterior is characterized by its white marble walls, spires, domes, and its green Vermont slate roof, each chosen for their symbolic significance and alignment with temple traditions. The six spires symbolize what Brigham Young who taught about them representing the priesthood, according to the direction of the temple. The three spires on the east represent the First Presidency and the Melchizedek Priesthood. The three spires on the west, which are slightly lower in height, represent the Presiding Bishopric and the Aaronic Priesthood. The design incorporates elements that are reflective of both the local culture and the broader church symbolism.

Interior

The interior features a two-story celestial room that has three chandeliers, long wall tapestries, and a grand staircase, designed to foster a spiritually uplifting environment. The temple includes a baptistry, celestial room, four ordinance rooms used for the endowment ceremony, fourteen sealing rooms, and an assembly hall, each of which have ceremonial use. Symbolic elements are integrated into the design, providing deeper meaning to the temple's function and aesthetics.

Symbols

Incorporated into the design are symbolic elements representing the Bible and the Book of Mormon, which provide deeper spiritual meaning to the temple's appearance and function. Symbolism is an important subject to church members and include the spires and baptismal font. The central spire represents reaching upwards to heaven, with the angel Moroni on its top symbolizing the church’s mission to spread the gospel of Jesus Christ. In the temple, baptismal fonts rest on the back of 12 oxen, symbolizing the twelve tribes of Israel and the strength and power of God’s work.

== Dedication ==
After the temple's completion in 1989, an open house was held where members and non-members could tour the temple and learn about its significance to the church. The temple's open house drew over 300,000 visitors. Guided tours during the open house experienced high demand, with some visitors waiting up to 45 minutes in line to enter. Approximately 2,500 visitors per hour flowed through the temple. The tours for this temple were originally done in silence.

Involvement of local church members included about 9,000 volunteers contributing to the open house experience, including distribution of church literature and promoting the event through various media channels. Various inserts were sent out about the temple open house along with invitations, with as many as 1.5 million copies distributed. A movie about the temple was produced and shown on cable television, that was filmed on the grounds. Testimonials included spiritual experiences during the open house, with one anecdote involving a man initially distributing anti-Mormon literature. He opted to take a tour of the temple, after which he stopped distributing the information. The temple's grounds continue to be enjoyed by the surrounding community: in 2014, it was reported that 900 people visit daily.

The 1989 dedication of the temple took place in gatherings held from August 19 to 21 and included over 40,000 church members from the temple district of Oregon and Washington participation in the 11 dedicatory sessions.

Church president Ezra Taft Benson presided at the dedication, and was the first to use a trowel of mortar at the ceremony, along with his counselors in the First Presidency, and other leaders in attendance. The temple was dedicated by Benson's first counselor, Gordon B. Hinckley, who emphasized the temple's significance as "a place of peace and holiness, a refuge from the storms of life," and "There is no compensation for service in terms of the coin of the world, but somehow there is a balm in these houses." Thomas S. Monson, Benson's second counselor, celebrated his 62nd birthday during the services, and adding a personal touch to the dedication, he invited a young local girl to join him, and presenting her with a white rose, he encouraged her to preserve it as part of the temple and return one day for a marriage ceremony.

Other remarks were directed at youth during the sessions (the minimum age for attendance was eight years old), encouraging them to prepare to do baptisms for the dead, missionary service, receive the endowment, and to be sealed.

== Visitors' center ==
On February 25, 2012, the church opened a new visitors' center adjacent to the temple. The visitors’ center replaced a former Church Distribution Center. The temple expanded its offerings with the addition of a visitors' center that was dedicated by Gary E. Stevenson in June 2013. The new visitors’ center serves as a place to learn about Jesus Christ, the restoration and doctrine of the church, temples, and eternal families.

Among its features, the visitors' center houses a replica of Danish sculptor Bertel Thorvaldsen's Christus similar to those found in other church visitors' centers. Additionally, there is a mural depicting a sunrise over the local landscape, exhibits detailing the history of the temple, explanations of temples and their significance to families, and displays featuring members sharing their testimonies of Jesus Christ.

An interactive exhibit introduces visitors to the Book of Mormon and its teachings, while another exhibit focuses on Jesus Christ as the Savior of the world, providing insights into His life, teachings, and the biblical settings associated with them. Furthermore, there are exhibits showcasing the testimonies of the First Presidency and members of the Quorum of the Twelve Apostles, along with teachings drawn from recent general conference addresses.

== Temple presidents ==
Since its dedication in 1989, the temple has been overseen by a series of temple presidents, each serving for a term of three years. The president administers all temple operations and provides spiritual guidance for both temple patrons and staff. The first president of the Portland Oregon Temple was Lorin Edwarde (Ted) Perry, who served from 1989 to 1992. As of 2025, Rick Lynn Marshall is the current president and his wife Bonnie Jean Bowen Marshall is the Temple Matron.

== Admittance ==
Like all temples of the church, the Portland Oregon Temple is not used for Sunday worship services. To members of the church, temples are regarded as sacred houses of the Lord. Once dedicated, only church members with a current temple recommend can enter for worship. The visitors’ center is available to the public.

== See also ==

Temples in and near Oregon
= Operating
= Under construction
= Announced
= Temporarily Closed

- List of temples of The Church of Jesus Christ of Latter-day Saints by geographic region
- The Church of Jesus Christ of Latter-day Saints in Oregon
- Religion in Portland, Oregon

== Gallery ==
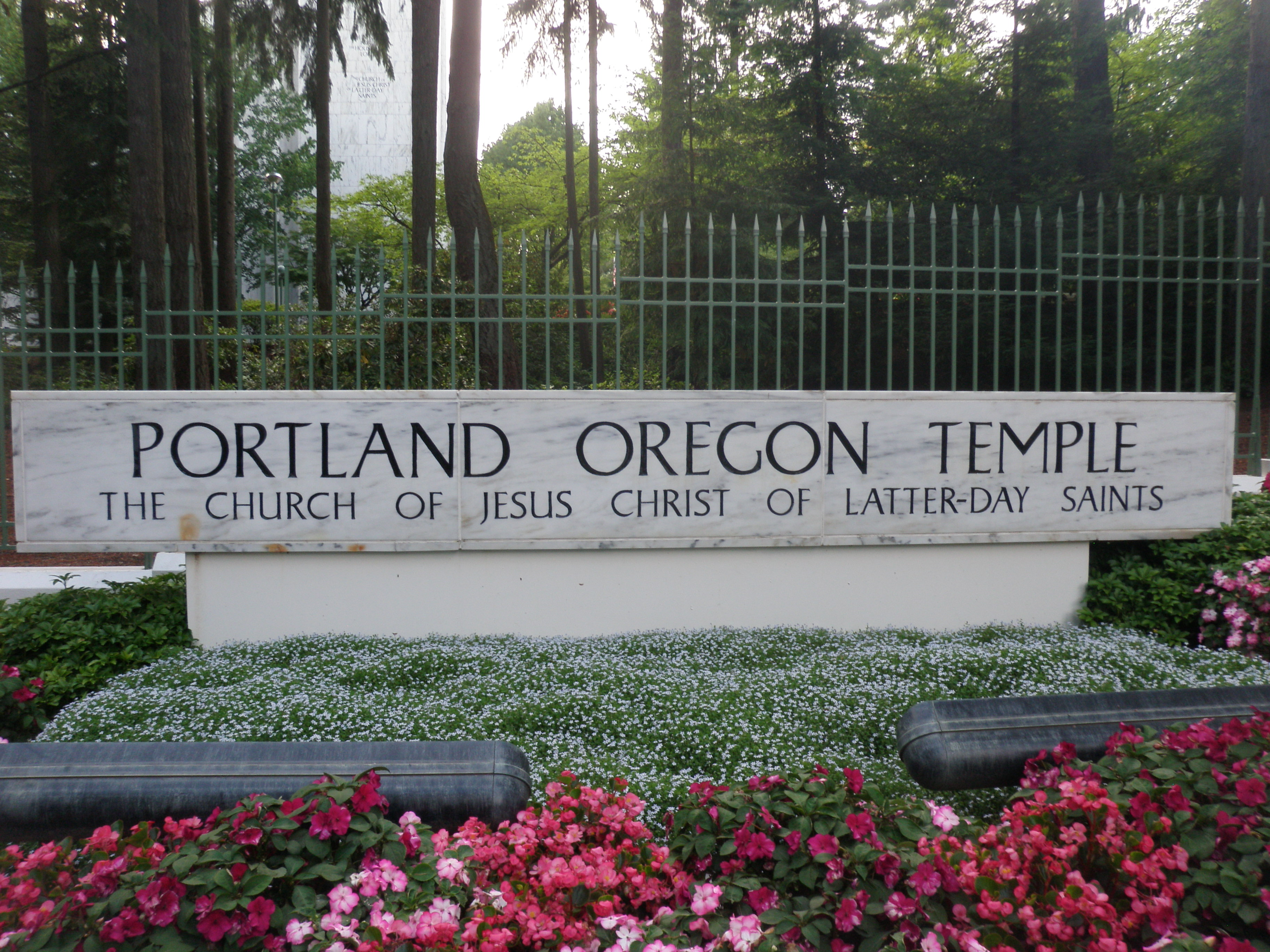
Portland Temple Sign

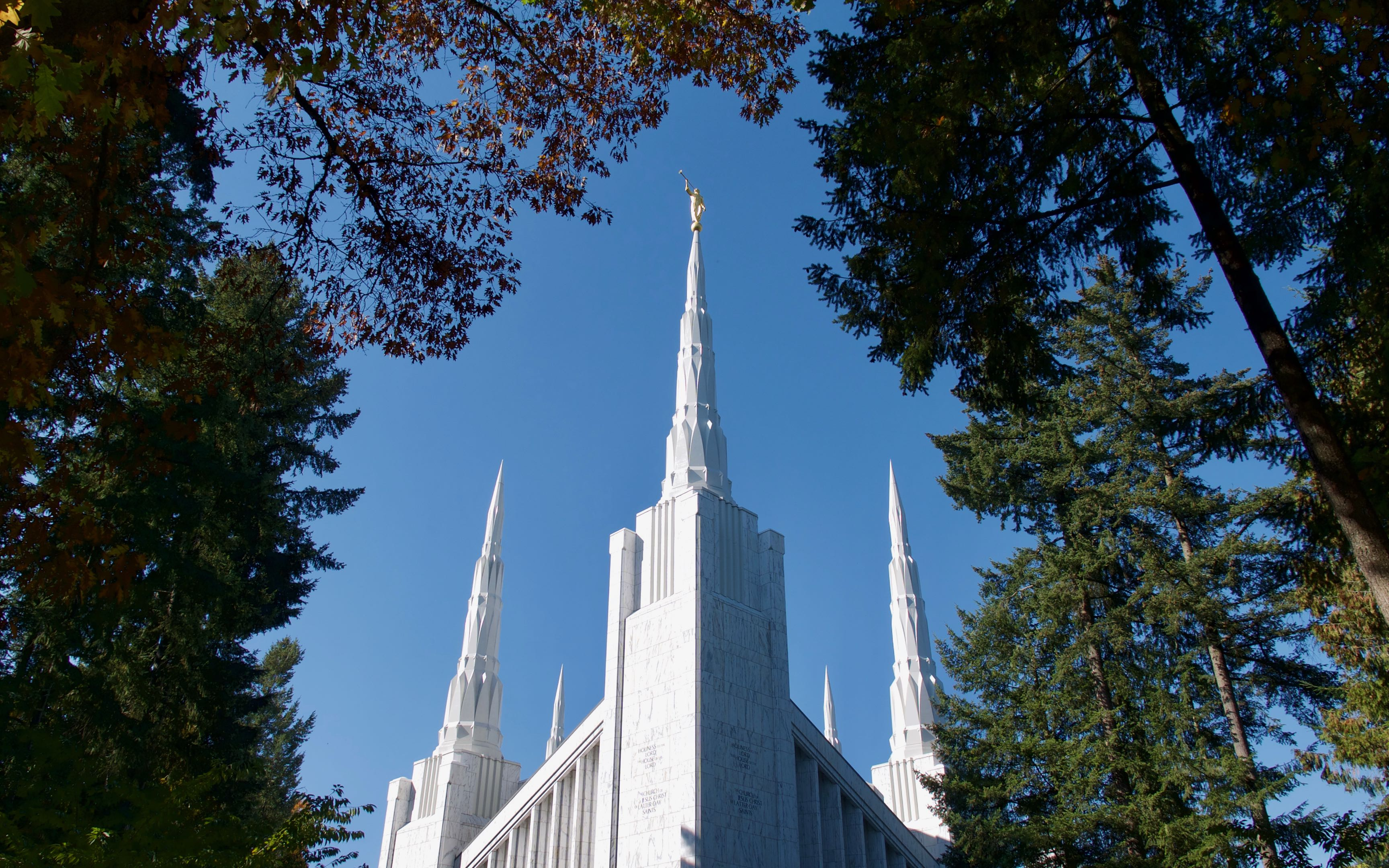
Spire of the Portland Oregon Temple

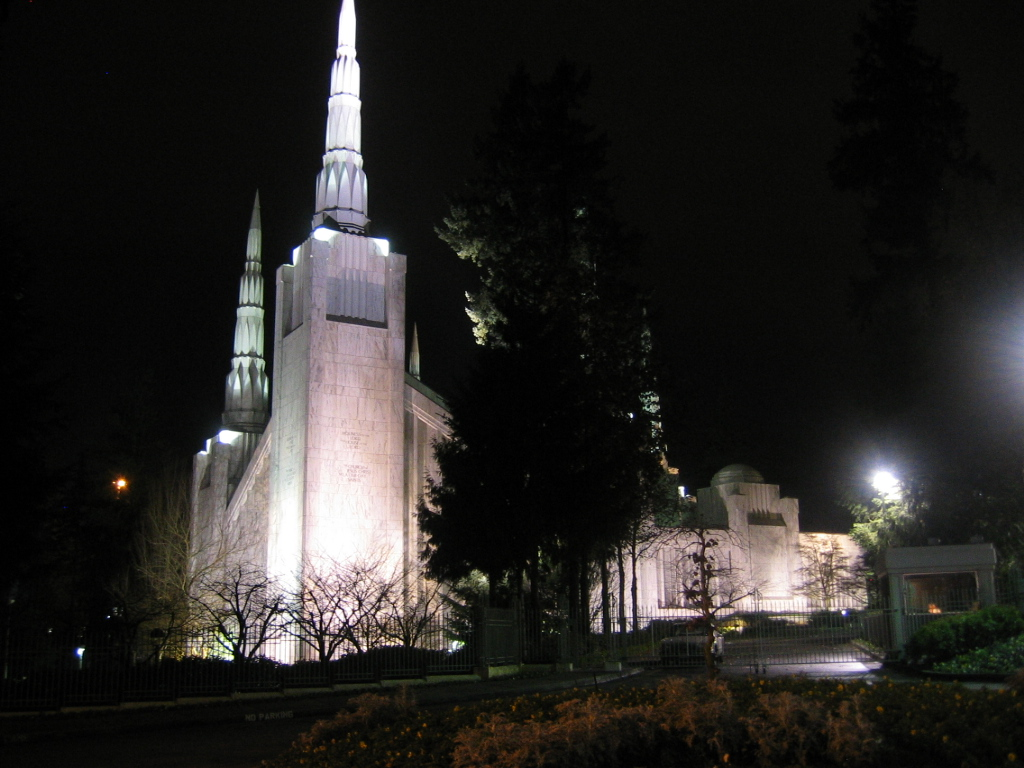
Portland Temple at night
