= Temple architecture (LDS Church) =

Architectural style

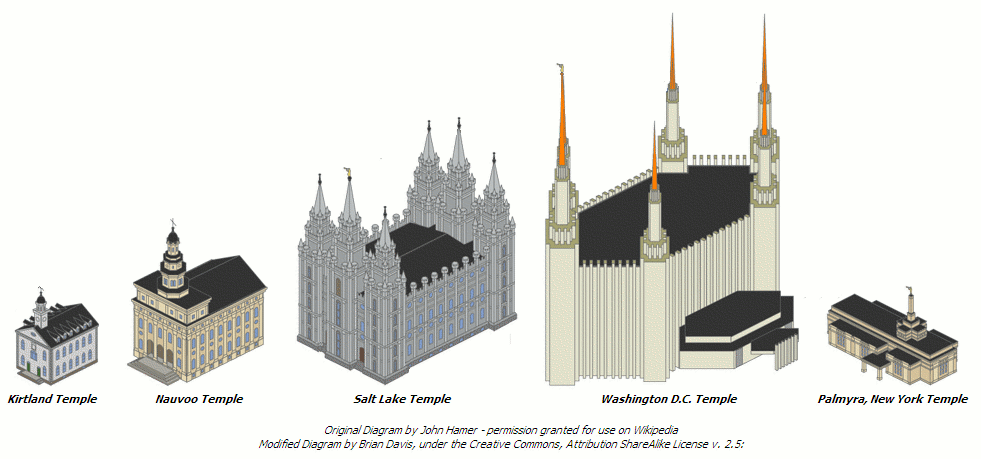
Comparison of several Latter Day Saints temples

On December 27, 1832, two years after the organization of the Church of Christ (Latter Day Saints), the movement's founder, Joseph Smith, stated he received a revelation that called upon church members to restore the practice of temple worship. The Latter Day Saints in Kirtland, Ohio, were commanded to:

"Establish a house, even a house of prayer, a house of fasting, a house of faith, a house of learning, a house of glory, a house of order, a house of God."

The largest of the denominations that emerged from the Latter Day Saint movement, the Church of Jesus Christ of Latter-day Saints (LDS Church), views temples as the fulfillment of a prophecy found in Malachi 3:1 (King James Version).

The Kirtland Temple was the first temple of the Latter Day Saint movement and the only one completed in Smith's lifetime. Its unique design was replicated on a larger scale with the Nauvoo Temple and in subsequent temples built by the LDS Church. As the needs of the church have changed, so has temple architecture—from large castellated structures adorned with celestial symbols to smaller, simpler designs often derived from a standard set of plans.

== Historic Temples ==
=== Kirtland Temple ===
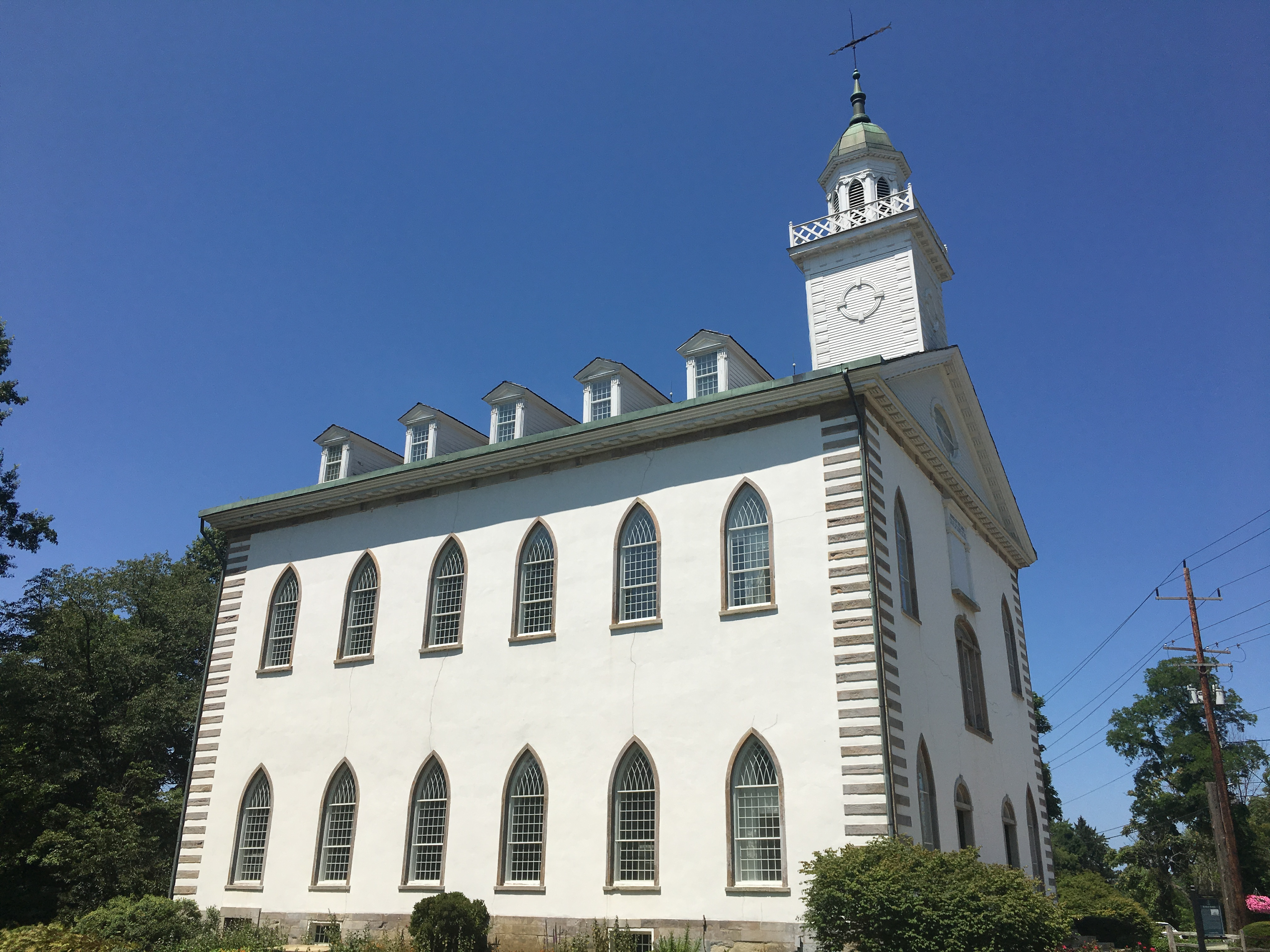
The Kirtland Temple

The Kirtland Temple, built in Kirtland, Ohio, was not designed as a church or cathedral. It was intended as a house of learning, where the School of the Prophets could meet. The temple was not built to accommodate the endowment ceremony, which was introduced later. It has no baptistery, as baptism for the dead was not yet practiced. The structure has two unique sets of pulpits, representing the Aaronic Priesthood and the Melchizedek Priesthood. The American architect Truman O. Angell recorded in his journal that around this time Frederick G. Williams, one of Smith's counselors in the church's First Presidency, came into the temple during construction and related the following account:

Joseph received the word of the Lord for him to take his two counselors, Frederick G. Williams and Sidney Rigdon, and come before the Lord and He would show them the plan or model of the house to be built. We went upon our knees, called on the Lord, and the building appeared within viewing distance, I being the first to discover it. Then all of us viewed it together. After we had taken a good look at the exterior, the building seemed to come right over us, and the makeup of this hall seemed to coincide with what I there saw to a minutia.

Following Smith's death and the associated succession crisis, Angell continued as the architect of the LDS Church, designing the Salt Lake Temple, Lion House, Beehive House, Utah Territorial Statehouse, St. George Temple, and many other public buildings.

The sandstone used to build the Kirtland Temple was quarried from south of the temple. Native timbers were cut from the surrounding forests. The temple, begun in 1833 and dedicated in 1836, was one of the largest buildings in Northern Ohio. It is a combination of Greek, Georgian, Gothic Revival, and Federalist architectural styles. The building has been designated a National Historical Landmark, and it has been recognized by the Architects Society of Ohio and the Ohio Historical Society.

The pulpits and the pews are among the distinctive features of the temple's interior. Two sets of pulpits grace the main floor, with another two sets on the second floor. The seats in the pew boxes are benches that can be shifted from back to front, thus making it possible for the congregation to face either the front or the rear pulpit.

The main floor of the Kirtland Temple was used for various worship services, and the second floor was used as a school for the ministry. The third floor contained rooms for the "Kirtland High School" during the day and church quorum meetings during the evening. The west third-floor room was Smith's office.

=== Nauvoo Temple ===
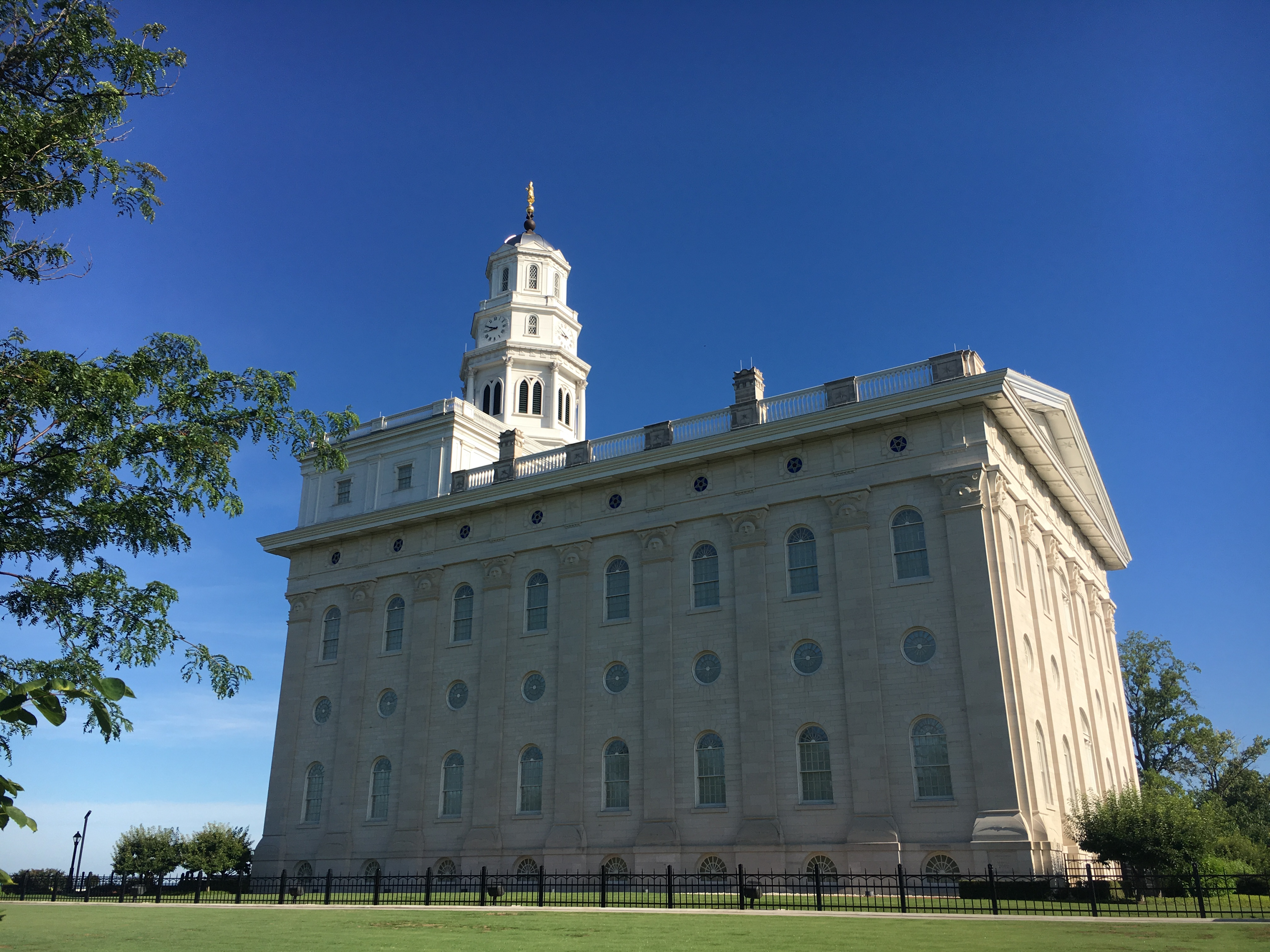
The Nauvoo Illinois Temple, which was completed in 2002

Construction of the original Nauvoo Temple began on April 6, 1841, and its final dedication was in May 1846. Differing from the Kirtland slightly in that it leaned more towards neoclassical in style, this temple was designed in the Greek Revival style by architect William Weeks, under the direction of Smith. Weeks' design made use of sunstones, moonstones, and starstones. Some people have thought that these represented distinctively Latter-day Saint motifs, the Three Degrees of Glory in the LDS Church's conception of the afterlife (D&C 76: 70–81). The placement of these symbols on the building in descending order—starstones, sunstones, and moonstones—does not support the preceding claim, but rather reflects Revelation 12:1.

At its base, the building was 128 ft (39 m) long and 88 ft (27 m) wide, with a clock tower and weather vane reaching 165 ft (50 m)—a 60% increase over the dimensions of the Kirtland Temple. Like the Kirtland, the Nauvoo Temple contained two assembly halls, one on the first floor and one on the second, called the lower and upper courts. Both temples had classrooms and offices in the attic. Unlike the Kirtland, the Nauvoo Temple had a full basement, which housed a baptismal font.

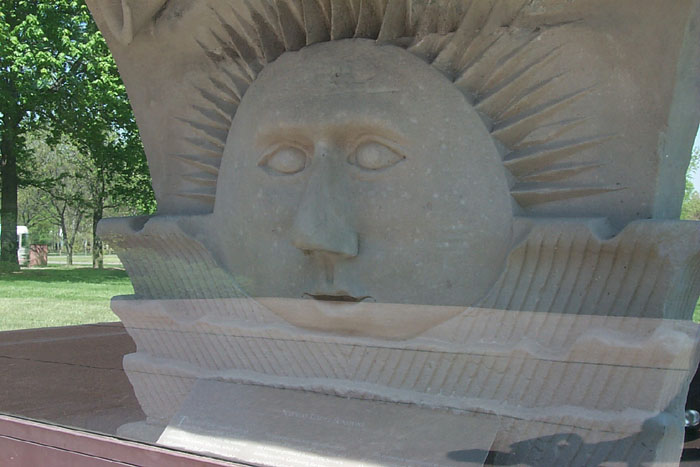
A sunstone from the original Nauvoo Temple in Illinois. The stone is in a case in front of the Visitor Center of The Church of Jesus Christ of Latter-day Saints in Nauvoo, Illinois.

==== Basement ====
The basement of the Nauvoo Temple, used as the baptistery, contained a large baptismal font in the center of the main room. The basement proper was 100 ft (30 m) long and 40 ft (12 m) wide, with six rooms of varying size on either side. The basement originally featured a tongue-and-groove white-pine font painted white. The font was 16 ft (4.9 m) long, 12 ft (3.7 m) wide, and 4 ft (1.2 m) deep. This font was replaced with a limestone one after several years to better handle water. Two railed stairways led to the font from the north and south sides. A well on the east side of the font provided the water supply.

==== Great Hall ====
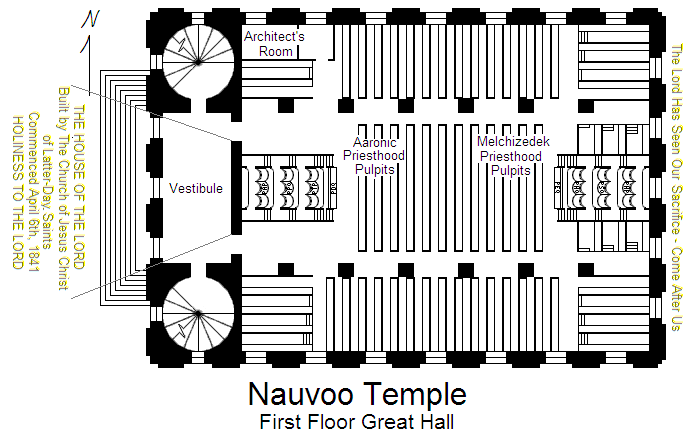
Floor plan of the Nauvoo Temple's first-floor Great Hall and vestibule

A flight of eight broad steps led to a landing, where two more steps entered three archways. These archways led to the vestibule, the formal entrance to the temple. The archways were approximately 9 ft (2.7 m) wide and 21 ft (6.4 m) high.

Two large double doors on the east wall opened to the first-floor assembly hall of the lower court, known as the "Great Hall", which occupied the remainder of the floor space east of the vestibule. Two doors—one on the north wall and another on the south—opened to the landing of two spiral staircases (one in the northwest corner and the other in the southwest) which led to the attic. These were the only points of access to the rest of the building. The room was flanked on either side by seven large, arched windows, with four similar windows along the east wall. An arched ceiling spanned some 50 ft (15 m) in breadth, in the center of the room. The floor was stained wood, and the walls were painted white.

One report mentioned that on the east wall of the vestibule was an entablature, similar to the one on the facade, which read in bright gilded letters as follows: "THE HOUSE OF THE LORD – Built by The Church of Jesus Christ of Latter-day Saints – Commenced April 6th, 1841 – HOLINESS TO THE LORD."

At the east and west ends of the hall were two sets of similar pulpits. These were arranged with four levels, the top three consisting of a group of three semi-circular stands. The lowest level was a drop table that was raised for use in the sacrament. The pulpits to the east, standing between the windows, were reserved for the Melchizedek Priesthood. Written in gilded letters along the arch of the ceiling, above the eastern pulpits, were the following words: "The Lord Has Seen Our Sacrifice – Come After Us." The pulpits at the west end were reserved for the Aaronic Priesthood.

The hall was fitted with enclosed pews with two aisles. The room could accommodate as many as 3,500 people. Because there were pulpits at both ends of the room, the pews had movable backs that could be swung to face either direction, depending on who was presiding—the Melchizedek Priesthood or the Aaronic Priesthood. The first floor also included a mezzanine with fourteen small rooms.

==== Stairwells ====
The two stairwells were constructed of dressed limestone walls. One rose from the northwest corner and the other from the southwest corner of the temple. They were not true circles but were flattened on four sides; they were also asymmetrical, measuring 16 ft (4.9 m) in diameter from east to west and 17 ft (5.2 m) from north to south. This was done to support landings and other support structures.

The staircases, made of wood, provided access to all levels of the temple, with a landing at each floor. The southwest staircase was completely finished, but the staircase in the northwest corner was never completed—it was roughed in with temporary boards resting on the risers. Workmen used this staircase to gain access to the building during its construction, especially during the winter of 1845–1846, when persons were using the other staircase to reach the attic for ordinance work.

==== Second-floor assembly hall ====
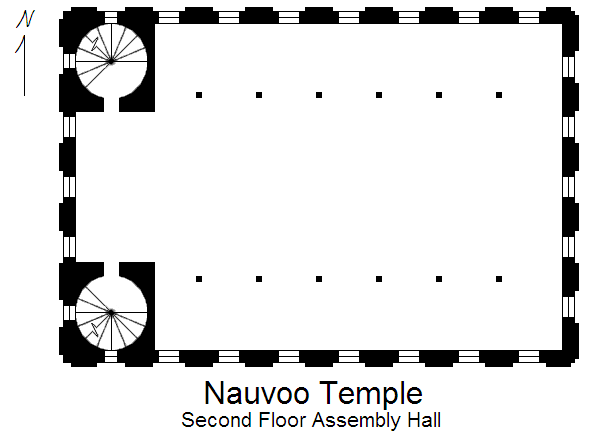
Floor plan of the Nauvoo Temple's second-floor assembly hall

The second-floor hall was similar in construction to the Great Hall, except that it included the foyer area, the location of the vestibule. This made the room about seventeen ft longer than the Great Hall. A 41-foot-long (12 m) stone arch ran north and south between the circular stairwells supporting the massive timbers for the tower above. The room had seven large windows along the north and south walls, with four windows along the east wall.

The floor would have had a similar configuration as the Great Hall with a set of double pulpits and pews, but the interior was never completed. The room was furnished with wooden benches for an occasional meeting. The second-floor hall also included a mezzanine with fourteen small rooms.

==== Attic ====
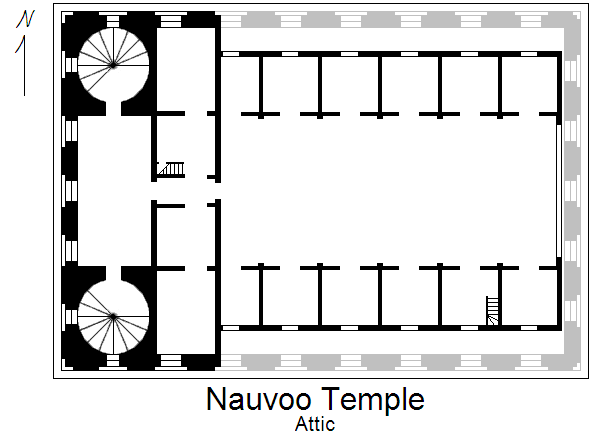
Floor plan of the Nauvoo Temple's attic

At the top of the temple's two stairways, opening to a foyer, was the attic floor. The attic was built not of limestone, but of wood. The west end of the temple was a flat-roofed section that supported the tower. The rest of the attic was a pitched-roof section running the length of the temple. The area was illuminated by six windows along the foyer's west wall. Outside windows also provided light along the north and south sides. The roof had four octagonal skylight windows to provide light for the interior rooms, in addition to a twenty-foot arched window.

==== Tower rooms ====
Rising from the plateau of the attic was an octagonal tower. The tower was divided into three sections, each accessible by a series of stairways leading from the attic to an observation deck above. The lowest section was a belfry containing a bell, which was rung for various occasions. Between the observation deck and the belfry was a section containing four clockwork mechanisms.

==== Reconstruction ====
In 1999, it was announced that the temple would be rebuilt with the same exterior appearance as the original temple. On June 27, 2002, the Nauvoo Illinois Temple was dedicated. The limestone used for the original temple had been quarried from a site just west of the temple. The stone for the new temple was quarried in Russellville, Alabama, a site chosen specifically because the stone best matched the original.

The reconstructed baptistery follows the original, with the addition of a metal lining to prevent deterioration and a platform where witnesses may sit. The floor of the baptistery, the largest of any temple in the LDS Church, was replicated in red brick tile. A dome and chandelier are featured in the ceiling, and an art glass window is at the east end. The room has intricate crown moldings. The window moldings include a framework for six-pointed stars made of red, white, and blue glass to replicate the originals.

== Major designs ==
=== Castellated temples in Utah ===
==== St. George Utah Temple ====
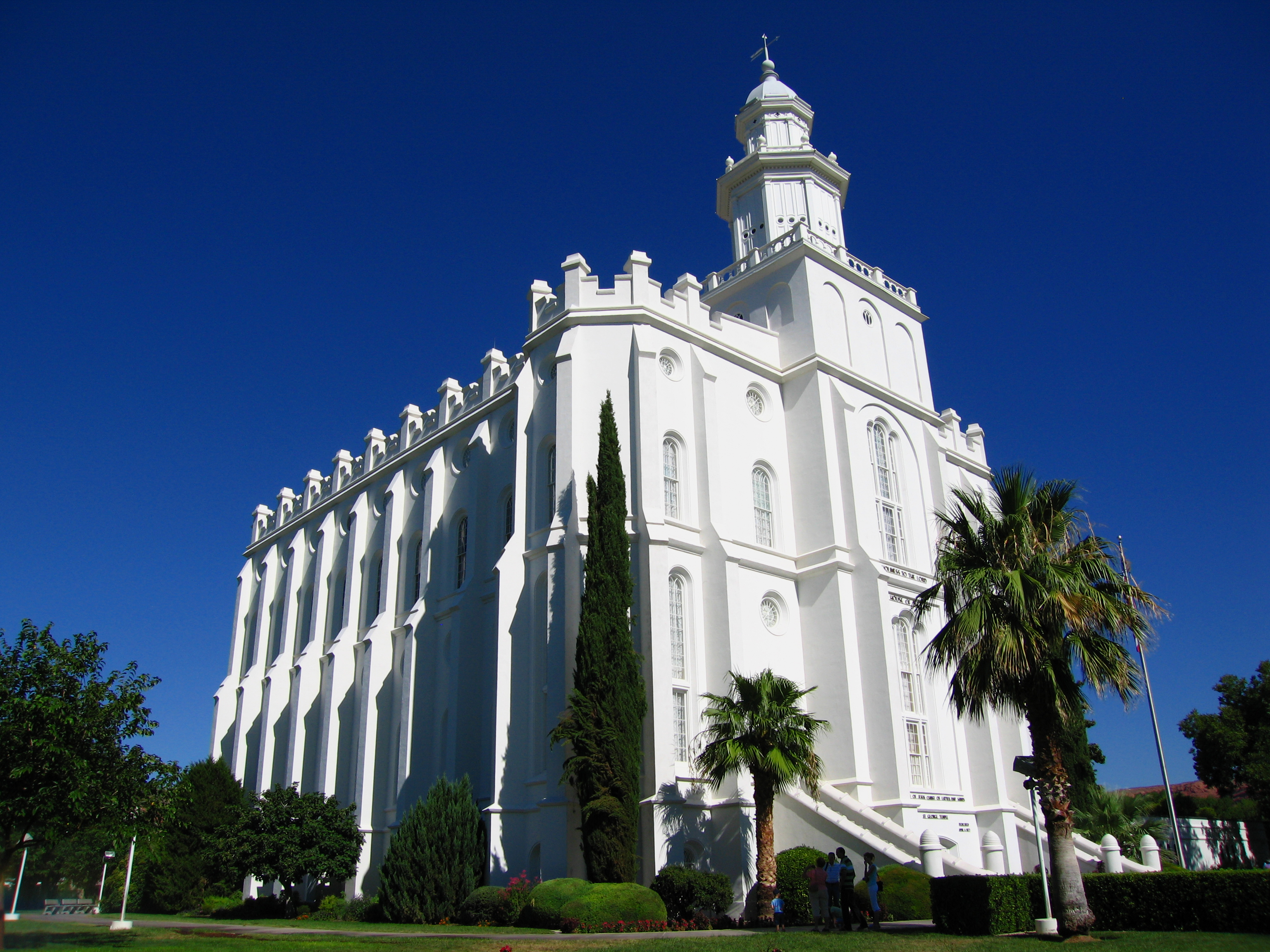
St. George Utah Temple

The St. George Utah Temple (1), described as castellated neo-Gothic and French Norman Revival in style, has three ordinance rooms and eighteen sealing rooms. It has a total floor space of 110,000 sq ft (10,000 m^{2}).

The temple was originally patterned after the Kirtland and Nauvoo Temples, with two large assembly halls featuring a set of pulpits at each end. The lower hall was partitioned with screens for presenting the endowment. The temple was extensively remodeled during 1937–1938, when the lower hall was permanently divided into five progressive-style endowment rooms.

About a year after the original dedication, a lightning storm caused extensive damage to the original tower. It was replaced with a taller tower.

Following a second major renovation project in 1975, the progressive-style ordinance rooms were replaced with three motion-picture ordinance rooms. Live-acting endowment sessions were much longer than the filmed ones, and only three were performed each day. The film version permitted fourteen sessions each day.

==== Logan Utah Temple ====
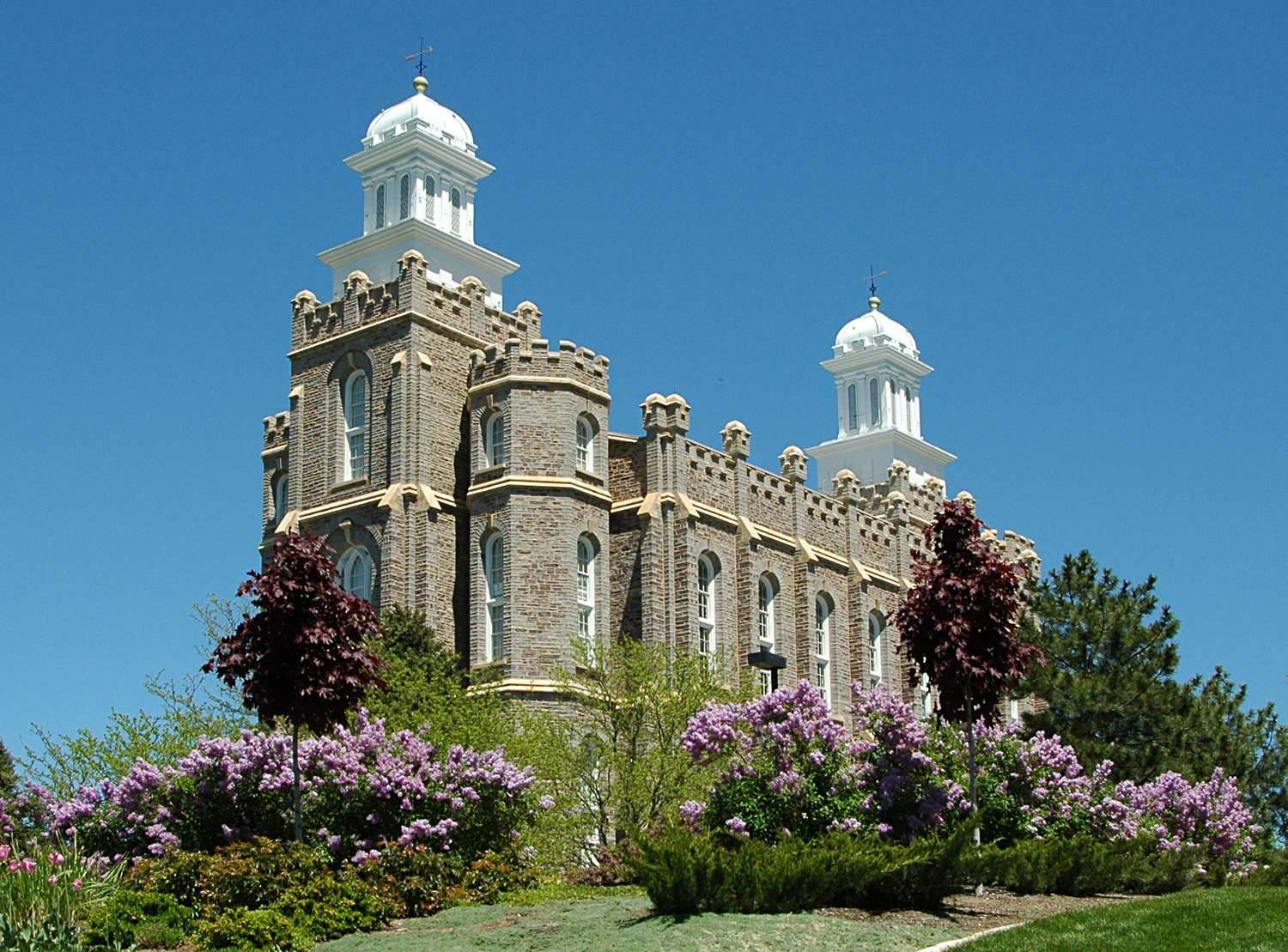
Logan Utah Temple

The Logan Utah Temple (2) was the first temple to feature progressive-style ordinance rooms for presenting the endowment ceremony. This design featured a room symbolizing each stage of human progress: the Creation Room, representing the events of Genesis; the Garden Room, representing the Garden of Eden, where Adam and Eve lived before the fall of man; the World Room, where Adam and Eve lived after the Fall; the Terrestrial Room; and the Celestial Room, representing heaven.

During the 1970s, the interior of the temple was removed, and only the exterior walls remain from the original construction. The two-year project replaced the progressive-style ordinance rooms with motion-picture ordinance rooms, constructed a new annex, and addressed many of the structural problems that the temple had developed. Spencer W. Kimball, the church president who rededicated the completed temple in 1979, regretted the need to reconstruct the temple's interior because of the loss of pioneer craftsmanship. In addition to these ordinance rooms, the temple has eleven sealing rooms with a total floor area of 119,619 sq ft (11,113 m^{2}).

The exterior walls of the Logan Utah Temple were originally painted a buff color to hide the dark, rough-hewn limestone. In the early 1900s, however, the paint was allowed to weather away, uncovering the stone that characterizes the temple today.

==== Manti Utah Temple ====
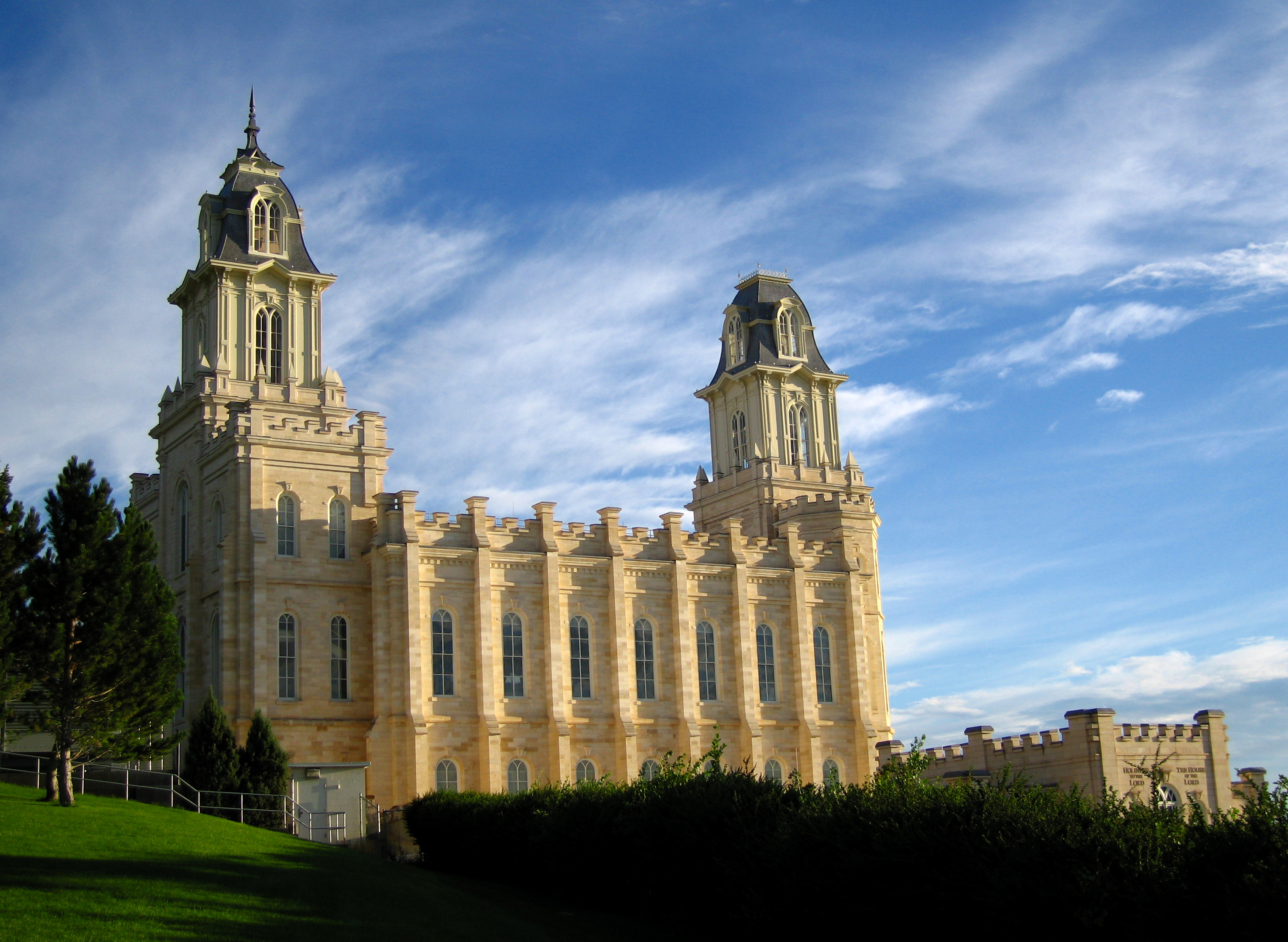
Manti Utah Temple

The Manti Utah Temple (3) is described as castellated in style with influences of Gothic Revival, Neo-Renaissance, Second Empire, and Colonial Revival architecture. The temple has four progressive-style ordinance rooms and eight sealing rooms, the final ordinance room being in the French Baroque style. The total floor area is 100,373 sq ft (9,325 m^{2}). The ordinance rooms feature painted murals. The Creation Room mural is the oldest in any LDS temple. The murals from the Garden and World Rooms were replaced in the 1940s because of extensive water damage. A notable engineering achievement of the early Mormon pioneers is the open-center, self-supporting, spiral staircases located adjacent to the temple's west tower.

==== Salt Lake Temple ====
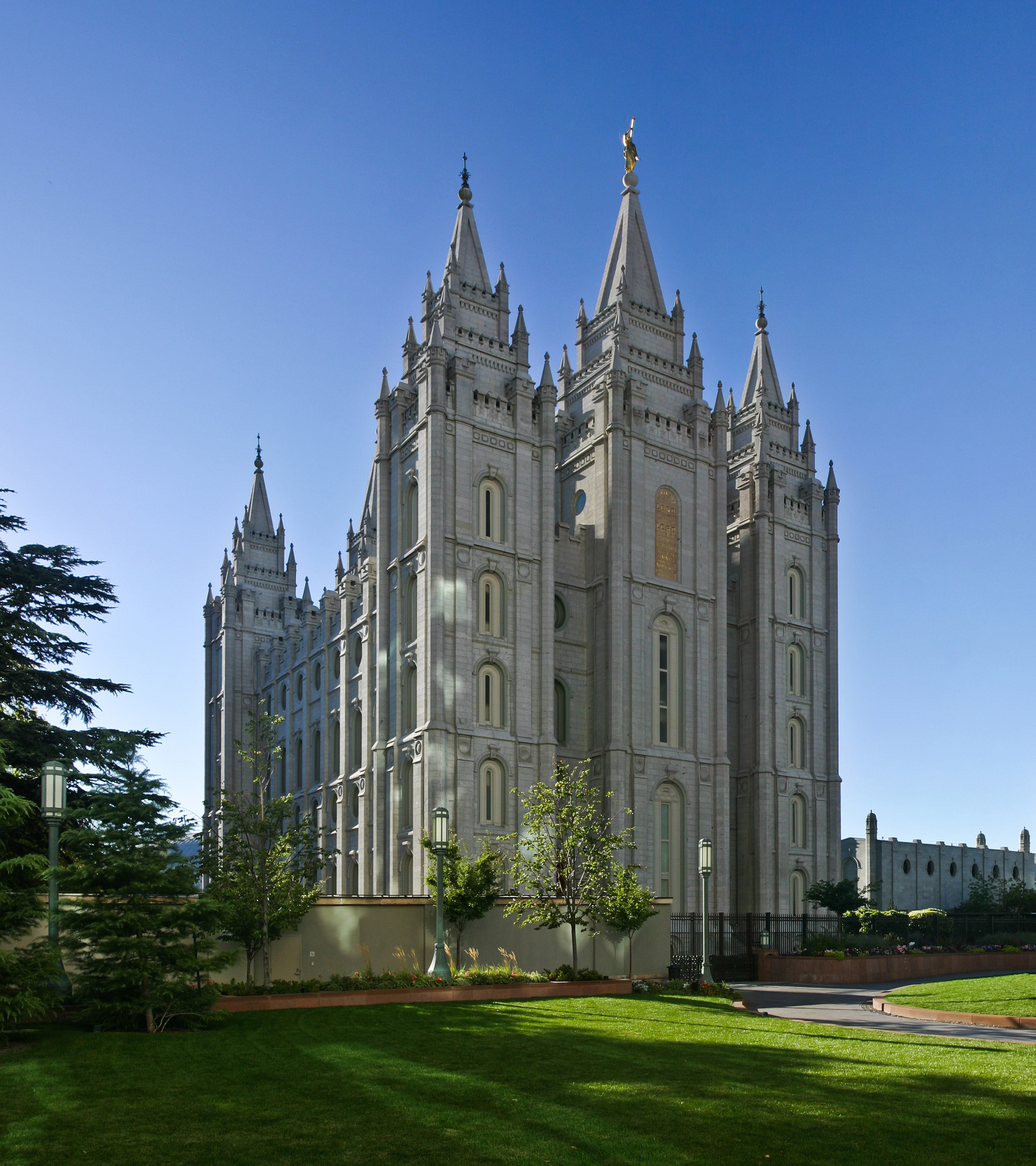
Salt Lake Temple

The Salt Lake Temple (4) is the most recognizable of all Latter-day Saint temples, and it is an international symbol of the Church. It is the LDS Church's largest temple, with a total floor area of 253,000 square feet (23,500 m^{2}). (The Los Angeles California Temple was larger before the Salt Lake Temple was expanded.) The first of the castellated temples to be started, it was the last to be completed, after 40 years of construction. The building has six spires, suggestive of Gothic and other classical styles, but distinctive and symbolic. It has four progressive-style ordinance rooms and fourteen sealing rooms.

The walls of the Salt Lake Temple are nine feet thick at the base and six feet thick at the top. It was the first temple to feature the prominent standing Angel Moroni statue, which was created by Paris-trained sculptor Cyrus E. Dallin. Before the creation of that statue, the Nauvoo Temple had a flying-angel weather vane. Of the dozen temples built between the construction of the Salt Lake Temple and the 1980s, only the Los Angeles, California, and the Washington, D.C., temples had similar statues. Angel Moroni statues then became a standard part of nearly all LDS temples, and these statues have been added to several temples originally built without them.

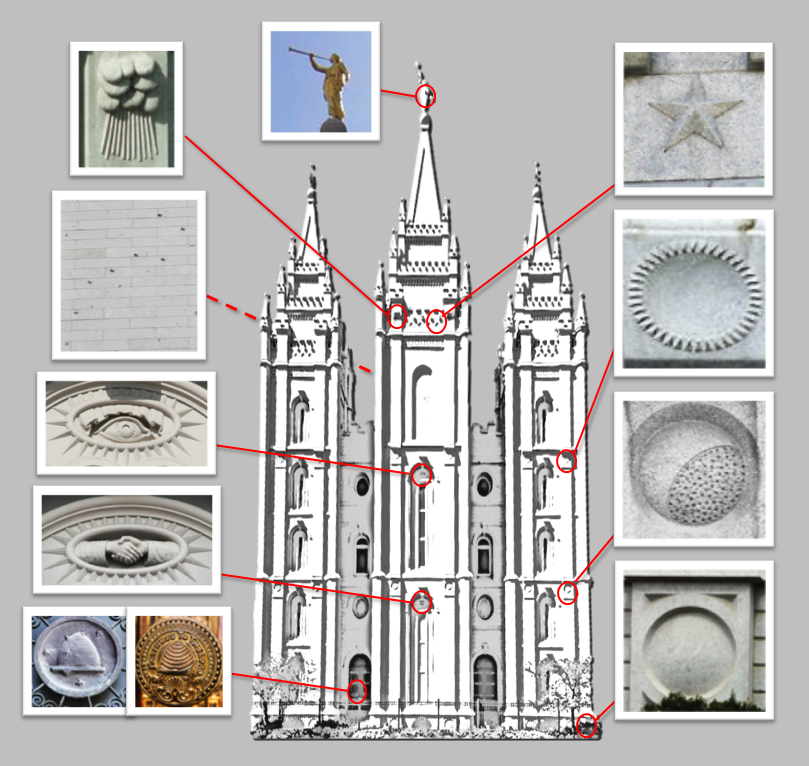
Some of the Salt Lake Temple's exterior symbols

The Angel Moroni represents both a messenger of the restoration of the gospel and a herald of the Second Coming: "for the Son of Man shall come, and he shall send his angels before him with the great sound of a trumpet, and they shall gather together the remainder of his elect from the four winds" (JS-M 1:37).

The Salt Lake Temple features murals on the walls of its progressive-style ordinance rooms, excluding the Terrestrial and Celestial Rooms, which are adorned in an elaborate French Renaissance Revival style.

The east and west towers represent the Melchizedek and Aaronic Priesthoods, just as the east and west-facing pulpits did in the Kirtland and Nauvoo assembly halls. Additional symbolism has been added to the towers. The east-facing towers represent the First Presidency of the LDS Church, the highest office of the Melchizedek Priesthood. The west towers represent the Presiding Bishopric, the highest office of the Aaronic Priesthood. There are twelve pinnacles on each tower: the east pinnacles represent the office of the Twelve Apostles, and the west pinnacles represent the High Council.

Castle-like battlements surround the temple, symbolizing a separation from the world and a protection of the holy ordinances from the outside world.

At the base of each buttress is an earthstone. Earthstones represent the Earth, the "footstool of God". The Earth itself is in a telestial state, but it will transition into a terrestrial state with the coming of the Millennium, and it will finally receive Celestial glory at the end of one thousand years.

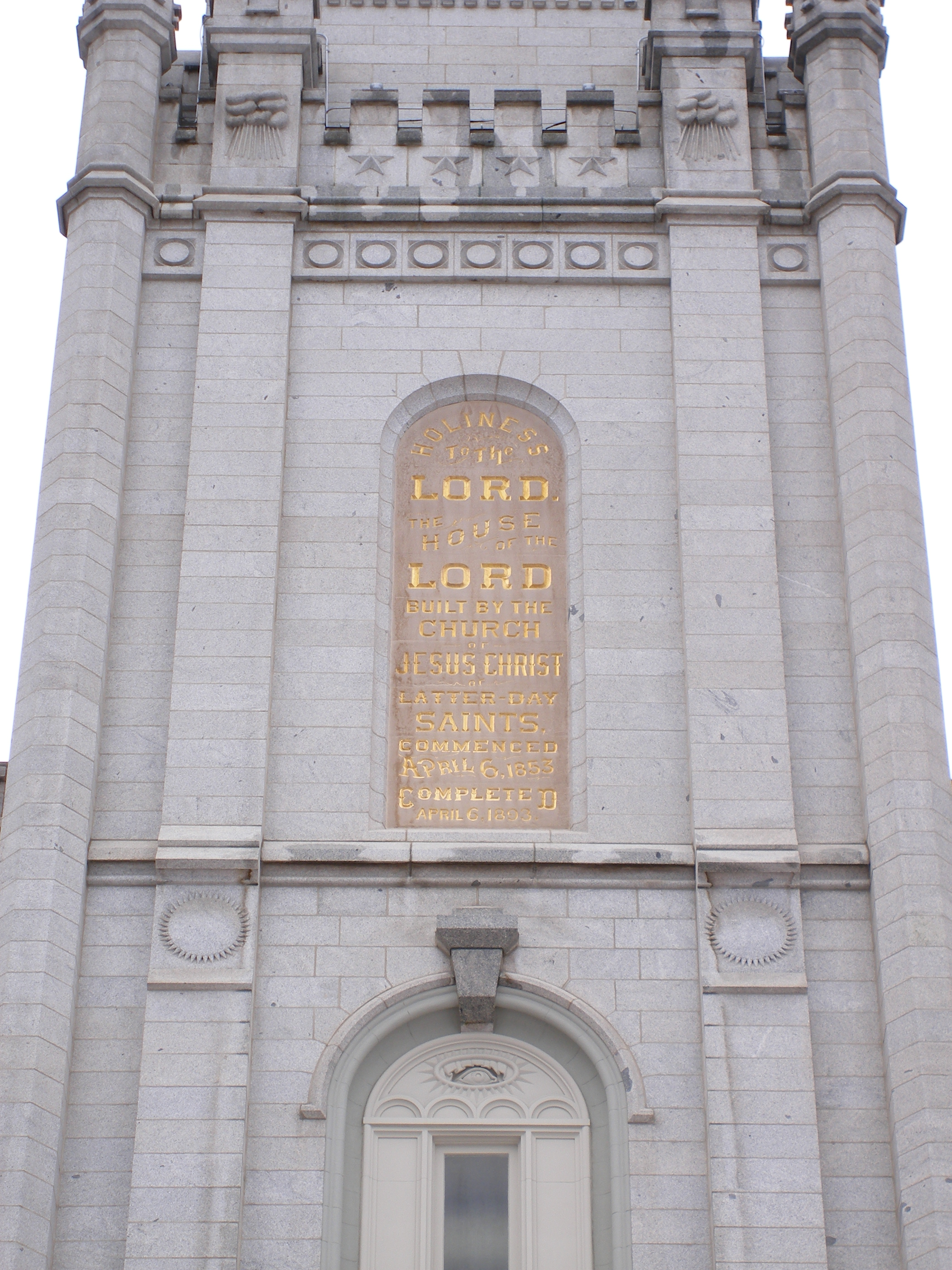
Top of the east side Center Spire of the Salt Lake Temple, featuring cloudstones, starstones, sunstones, and an eye of God

Moonstones are located directly above the earthstones. Each moonstone depicts the Moon in a different phase. The changing Moon represents the stages of the human progression from birth and life to death and resurrection. The Moon also represents a person's journey from total darkness into the full light of Christ. Above the moonstones are sunstones, representing celestial glory.

Two cloudstones are carved on the east center tower, with descending rays of light. The original plan was for one stone to be white and the other black, with descending trumpets. A parallel to this symbolism is found in the Old Testament. Once temples were dedicated in ancient Israel, they were filled with the "cloud of the Lord." At Mount Sinai, the children of Israel saw this cloud as both dark and bright, accompanied by the blasting of a trumpet.

Various starstones adorn the temple. Six-pointed stars represent the stars in the heavens. Inverted five-pointed stars represent morning stars, compared to the "sons of God" in the scriptures. The large upright five-pointed stars may represent the governing power of the priesthood, while the small upright five-pointed stars may represent the saving power of the priesthood for those who attach themselves to it.

The center west tower depicts the Big Dipper constellation. This motif represents the method travelers have used for thousands of years to find the North Star, symbolizing the purpose of the temple in showing the way to God.

Each of the center towers features a pair of clasped right hands identified as the "right hands of fellowship" cited in Galatians 2:9. In Jeremiah 31:32, the Lord uses the handclasp to denote covenant making—an act central to temple worship.

Each of the center towers has a carved All-Seeing Eye, which represents God's ability to see and know all things.

=== No-spire design ===
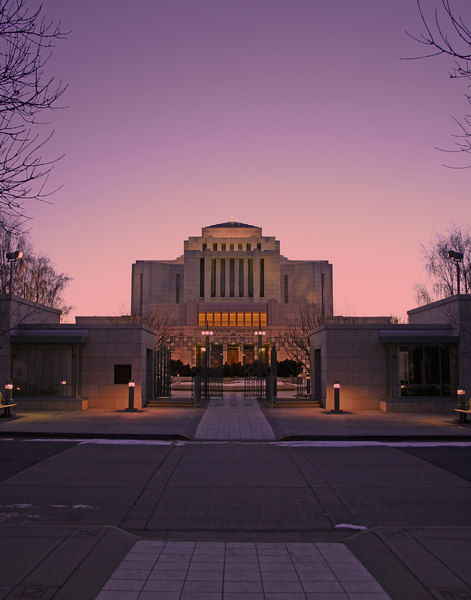
Cardston Alberta Temple

The construction of the Cardston Alberta Temple (6), on June 27, 1913, started two decades after the completion of the Salt Lake Temple. The temple at Cardston had the first design that was put out to bid with prominent architects, and it was the first to be designed without a priesthood assembly hall. This began a transition away from multi-purpose temples. The Cardston temple has 88,562 sq ft (8,228 m^{2}) of floor space. It has four ordinance rooms and five sealing rooms.

The design of the Cardston temple served as the basic pattern for the Laie Hawaii Temple (5), which was completed four years before the Cardston temple due to delays in Canada caused by World War I. Cardston also provided the pattern for the third temple built after Salt Lake, the Mesa Arizona Temple (7). These three temples, the first built outside of Utah, are often described as having the style of Solomon's temple.

The Laie Temple is decorated with carved friezes. Each side depicts four dispensations of time: Old Testament dispensation (west side), New Testament dispensation (south side), Book of Mormon dispensation (north side), and Latter-day dispensation (east side). The Laie Temple is the smallest of the three temples, with a total floor area of 47,224 sq ft (4,387.3 m^{2}), three ordinance rooms, and six sealing rooms.

The Cardston and Mesa temples were originally built at about the same size, but an addition to the Mesa temple in 1974 expanded its area to 113,916 sq ft (10,583 m^{2}). This temple has four ordinance rooms and nine sealing rooms, expanded from the original four sealing rooms.

=== Modern center-spire design ===
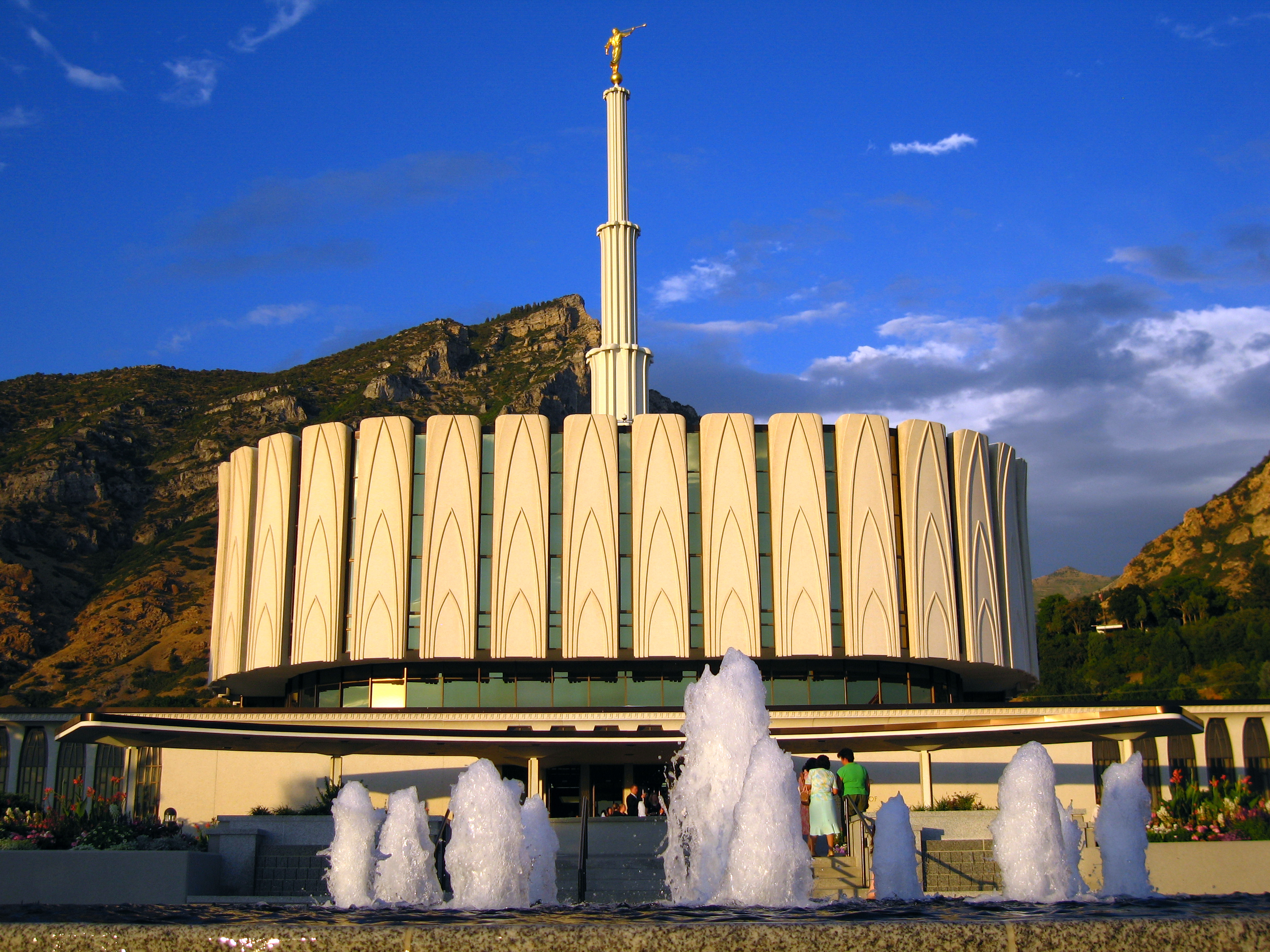
Provo Utah Temple

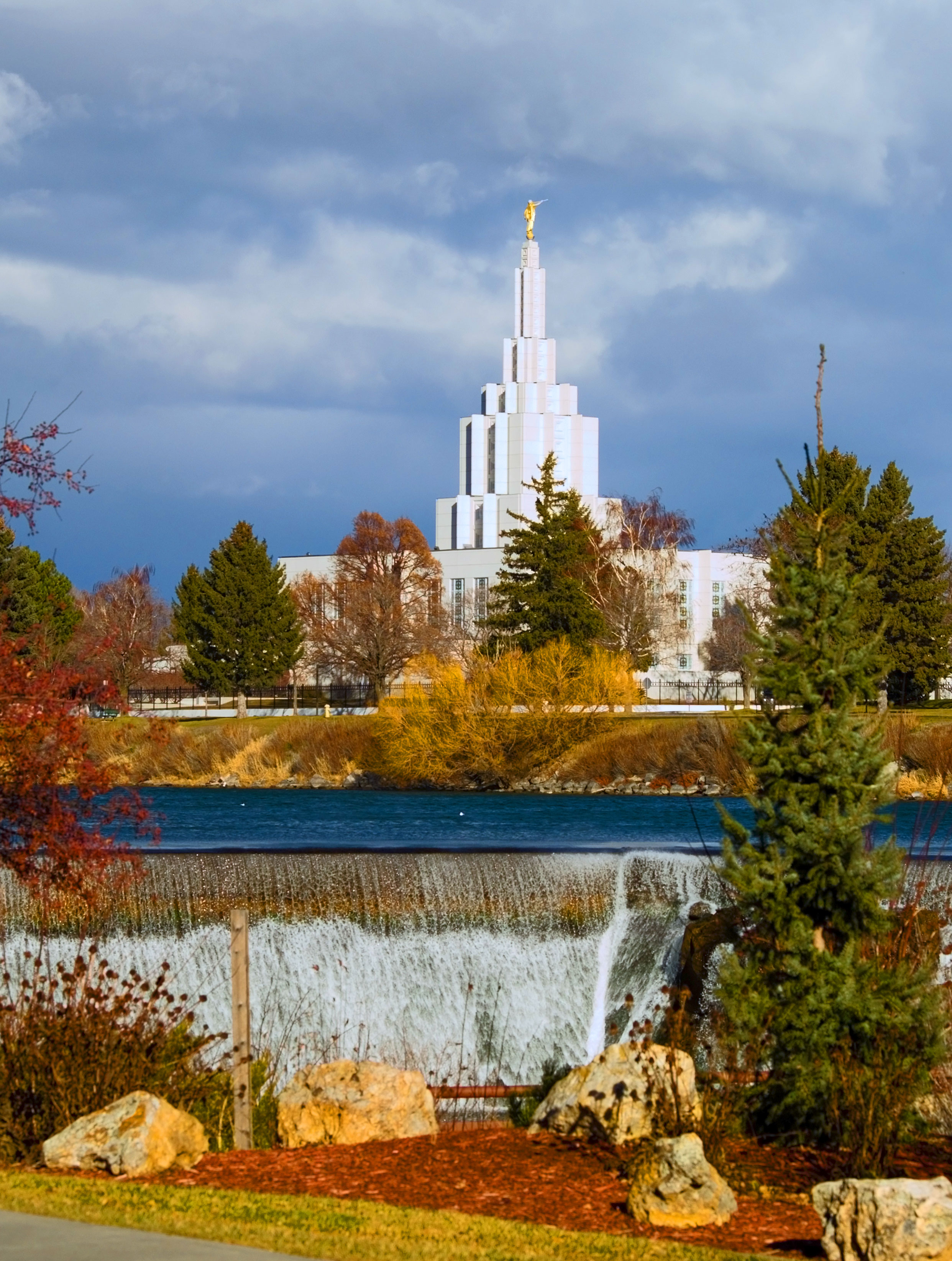
Idaho Falls Idaho Temple

The Idaho Falls Idaho Temple (8) was the first to be designed with a central spire. This design represented a return to spires, as the three previously dedicated temples featured no towers or spires. The temple has four progressive-style ordinance rooms and nine sealing rooms. The floor area is 92,171 sq ft (8,563 m^{2}).

The Oakland California Temple (13) is an unusual variation on the center spire design, because it incorporates four additional spires—one on each corner of the building—for a total of five. The center spire is the tallest. It is the only LDS Church temple with five spires. With a floor area of 95,000 sq ft (8,800 m^{2}), it was built slightly larger than the Idaho Falls temple, and it contains four ordinance rooms and seven sealing rooms.

With the construction of the Ogden Utah Temple (14), the design was expanded, with six ordinance rooms and eleven sealing rooms, and a floor area of 115,000 sq ft (10,700 m^{2}). This trend continued with the Provo Utah Temple (15), and eight years later with the Jordan River Utah Temple (20). Each temple was larger than the previous—at 128,325 sq ft (11,921.8 m^{2}) and 148,236 sq ft (13,771.6 m^{2}), respectively—with twelve sealing rooms for Provo and seventeen for Jordan River.

=== Modern single-spire design ===
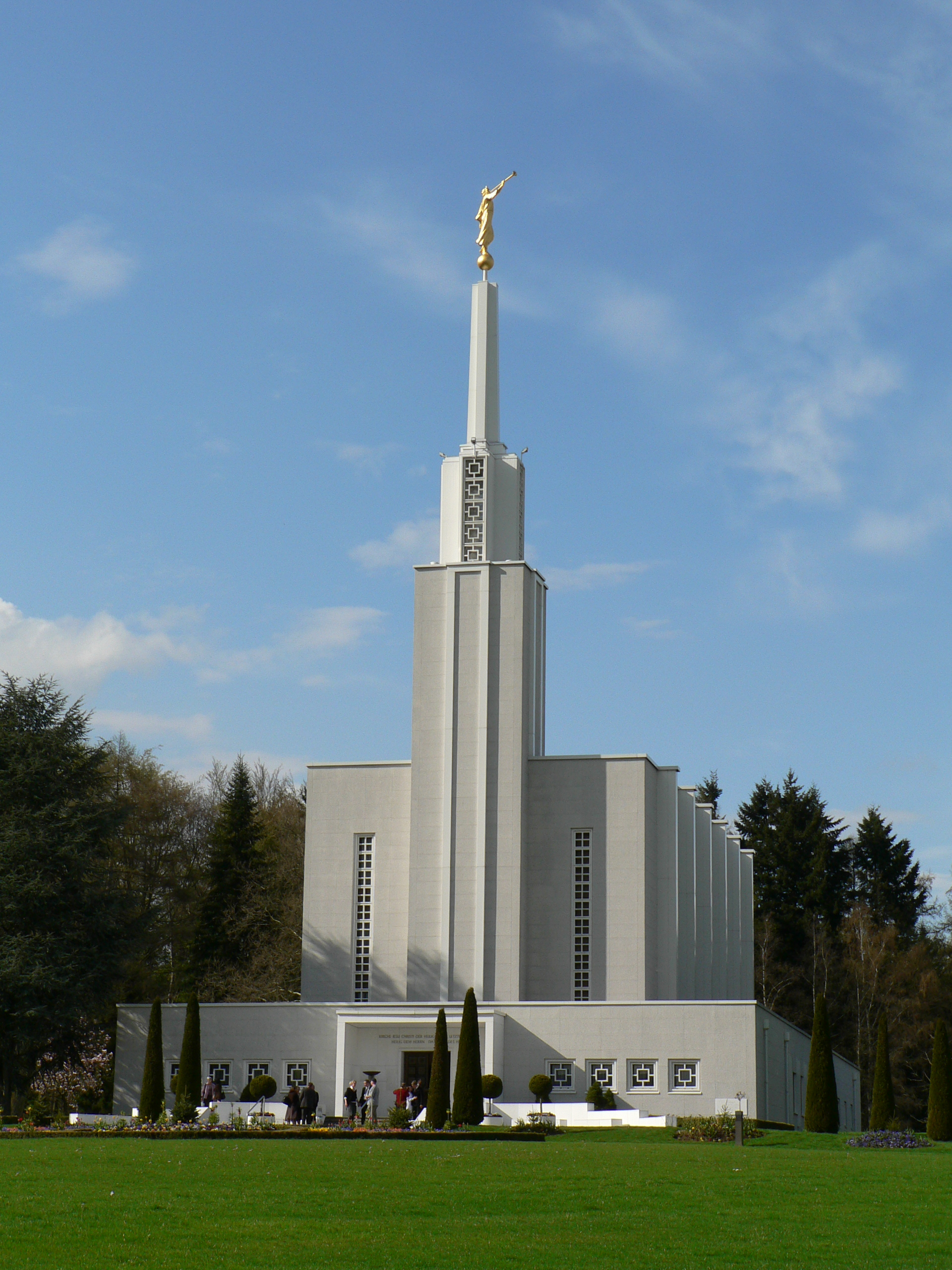
Bern Switzerland Temple in 2008

The first LDS Church temple built in Europe was the Bern Switzerland Temple (9). Its distinctive design diverged from the Idaho Falls style to one reminiscent of older temples such as the Kirtland and the Nauvoo, but more contemporary. This temple was designed to show a film presentation of the endowment, rather than use live actors, to accommodate the many languages of Europe. Originally built with one ordinance room and three sealing rooms, the Bern temple was remodeled in 1992 to update the interiors, as well as add ordinance and sealing rooms. The temple now has four ordinance rooms and seven sealing rooms. It has a floor area of 35,545 sq ft (3,302.2 m^{2}). In 2005, an Angel Moroni statue was added to the spire to commemorate the temple's 50th anniversary.

==== Los Angeles California Temple ====
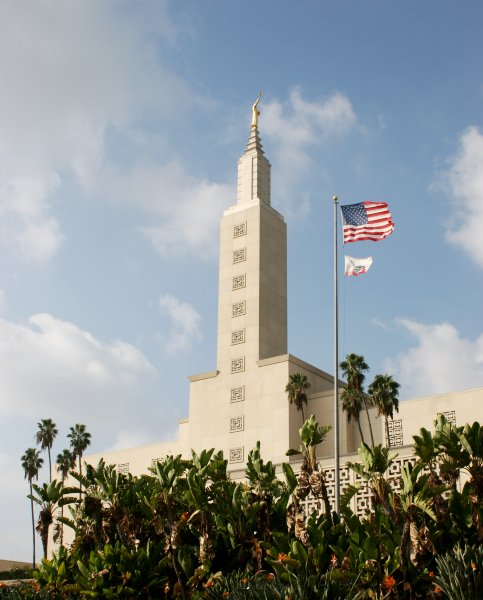
Los Angeles California Temple

At the time of construction, the Los Angeles California Temple (10) was the largest built by the LDS Church. It was dedicated in 1956. It is now second in size to the Salt Lake Temple, which was expanded through renovations. The Los Angeles was the first temple since the Salt Lake to contain a priesthood assembly room, added to the plans when World War II delayed construction. The Los Angeles was the last temple designed for live-actor presentation of the endowment. The ordinance rooms are filled with murals, and it is one of only three temples with murals in the Celestial Room (the others being the Idaho Falls Temple and the Nauvoo Illinois Temple).

When the statue of Angel Moroni was installed, it faced southeast (as does the temple), but it was shortly turned to face due east at the request of the Church president David O. McKay. In 2003, the temple was modified for a progressive-style presentation, with a newly renovated Terrestrial Room. The endowment was still presented on film. In November 2005, the temple was closed for a seismic overhaul and a renovation of the baptistery, which had drainage and mildew problems. The temple reopened July 11, 2006, fifty years after the original dedication.

In addition to the Celestial Room, the temple has four ordinance rooms (i.e., Creation Room, Garden Room, World Room, and Terrestrial Room), and ten sealing rooms. It has a square footage of 190,614 sq ft (17,708.6 m^{2}).

Following the basic design of the Bern temple, the Hamilton New Zealand Temple (11) was dedicated in 1958. It was built, along with the Church College of New Zealand, entirely by volunteer missionaries, and it was the first LDS Church temple in the Southern Hemisphere. It has one ordinance room and three sealing rooms. The floor space is 44,212 sq ft (4,107 m^{2}).

==== London England Temple ====
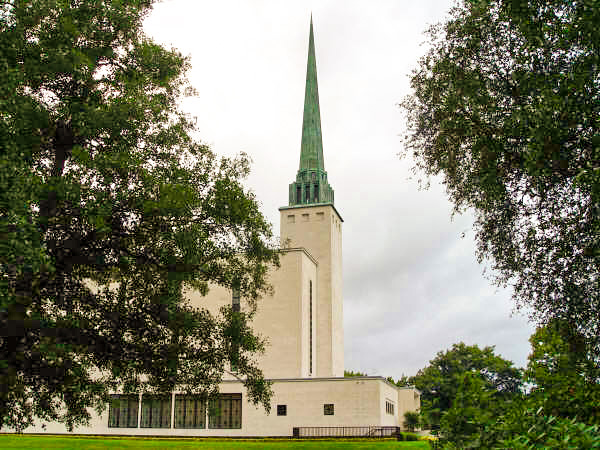
London England Temple

The London England Temple (12), dedicated in 1958, follows the basic pattern of the Bern and Hamilton temples. The London temple was renovated in 1992 to include four ordinance rooms and seven sealing rooms. The floor area is 46,174 sq ft (4,290 m^{2}).

The next temple to incorporate this style was built in 1980. Unlike the other LDS Church temples, the Seattle Washington Temple (19) was designed from the beginning to have four ordinance rooms and twelve sealing rooms. It is larger than the Bern, the Hamilton, and the London, at 110,000 sq ft (10,000 m^{2}).

Ten years later, the church built four temples, similar in style, based on the single-spire design. Each of these temples has four ordinance rooms and four sealing rooms. With sizes ranging from 57,000 to 69,600 sq ft (5,300 to 6,470 m^{2}), these temples are stylistically unique—although the Boston Massachusetts Temple (100), dedicated in 2000, resembles the St. Louis Missouri Temple (50), built three years earlier. The other temples in this style are the Preston England Temple (52), built in 1998, and the unique Santo Domingo Dominican Republic Temple (99), built in 2000.

Lawsuits arguing that the Massachusetts Dover Amendment unfairly discriminates against non-religious groups delayed the addition of the spire for the Boston temple by several years, as the courts decided whether the spire was a required element of the temple's design. In support of the Dover Amendment, which exempts religious structures from local zoning laws, the court continually sided with the LDS Church. Chief Justice Margaret H. Marshall wrote in the 17-page ruling, "A rose window at Notre Dame Cathedral, a balcony at St. Peter's Basilica, are judges to decide whether these architectural elements are 'necessary' to the faith served by those buildings?"

Some later temples have returned to this earlier style, having two floors and a smaller building, with fewer ordinance and sealing rooms:

- Curitiba Brazil Temple (126)
- Twin Falls Idaho Temple (128)
- Vancouver British Columbia Temple (131)

=== Small modern single-spire design ===
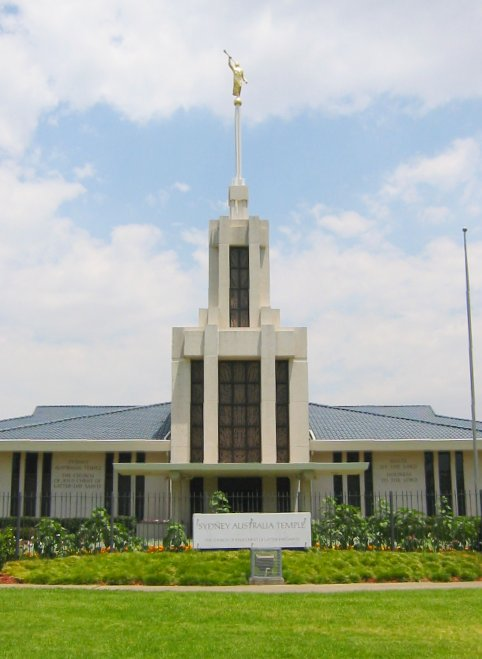
Sydney Australia Temple

In the mid-1970s, starting with the São Paulo Brazil Temple (17) and the Tokyo Japan Temple (18), the LDS Church designed temples based on a more chapel-like design: square buildings with a smaller spire. These first two temples had two ordinance rooms, but because there was no set plan during this time, the temples have four and five sealing rooms, respectively.

Soon after these temples were built, the church built a larger version: the Atlanta Georgia Temple (21). It has four ordinance rooms and five sealing rooms, along with a floor area of 35,360 sq ft (3,285 m^{2}). Later, the church would repeat this pattern with two similar temples: the Denver Colorado Temple (40) and the much larger Toronto Ontario Temple (44), each with six sealing rooms.

The Apia Samoa Temple (22) was built around this time, but during a renovation, the building caught fire and was destroyed. It was immediately rebuilt using a larger design, but still having a single spire. The temple has two ordinance rooms and two sealing rooms, with a total floor area of 18,691 sq ft (1,736.5 m^{2}).

Similar temples with two ordinance rooms are the Nuku'alofa Tonga Temple (23) and the Santiago Chile Temple (24), each having three sealing rooms, as well as the Papeete Tahiti Temple (25) and the Sydney Australia Temple (28), each having two ordinance rooms.

==== Freiberg Germany Temple ====
Located in Freiberg, Saxony, Germany, the Freiberg Germany Temple (33) was announced in October 1982; ground was broken for construction on April 23, 1983; and the temple was dedicated in 1985. Built in what was then the German Democratic Republic, the Freiberg Germany Temple is the only LDS temple to have been built in a communist state.

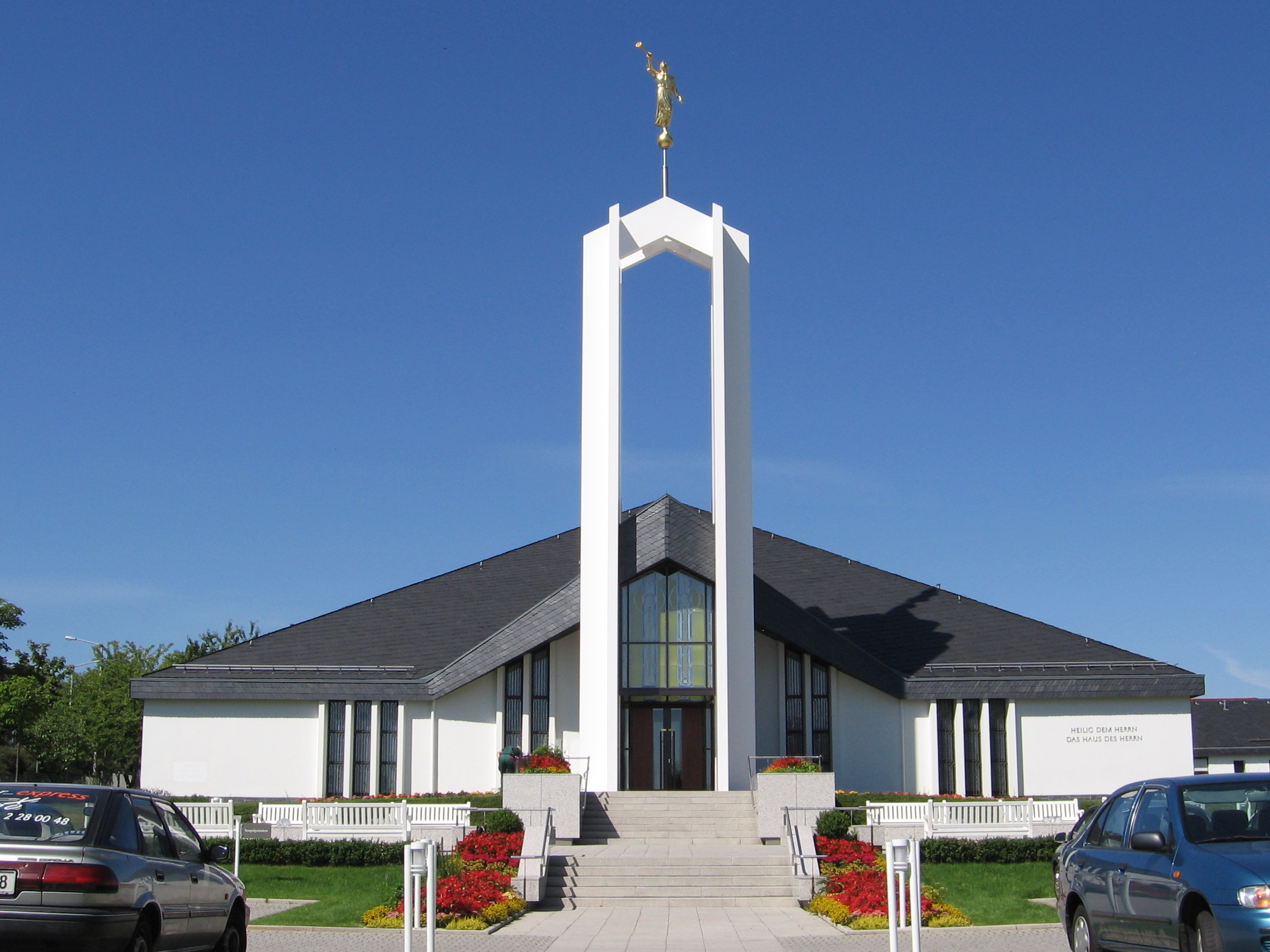
The Freiberg Germany Temple

The East German government approved temple construction on practical grounds, because of the many Latter-day Saints requesting visas to travel to Switzerland, the location of the Bern Switzerland Temple. The East German government wished to minimize citizens' travel outside the country.

The temple was built on a small scale, with no outward adornment. No oxen were used in the baptistery, and only a minimum of functional detail was allowed inside.

After German reunification in 1990, Germany became the first country outside of North America to have more than one temple—this and the Frankfurt Germany Temple.

Political changes in Germany allowed for renovating the temple during 2001–2002 to the high standards of contemporary temples. Additional square footage extending to the east approximately doubled the size of the temple. New amenities included twelve oxen to support the baptismal font, a non-patron waiting room, a matron/brides room, and an office for the temple president. On December 20, 2001, an Angel Moroni statue was placed on top of the temple. The temple is small, with one ordinance room and two sealing rooms, along with a total floor area of 14,126 sq ft (1,312.3 m^{2}).

=== Six-spire sloped roof design ===
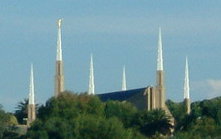
Johannesburg South Africa Temple

The first temple built using the six-spire sloped roof design was the Boise Idaho Temple, whose design started after the temple's announcement on March 31, 1982. Early examples of this design proved inadequate: the Boise, Dallas, and Chicago temples were closed for extensive renovations soon after opening. These renovations restructured rooms, added facilities, and made other enhancements that significantly improved the buildings. The last temple built using this design was the Las Vegas Nevada Temple, which was completed in 1989. This design was then largely replaced by the classic modern, single-spire design. The unifying concept behind this design was six spires and a sloped roof. Beyond those aspects, the temples varied widely in size and capacity, as illustrated in the following table:

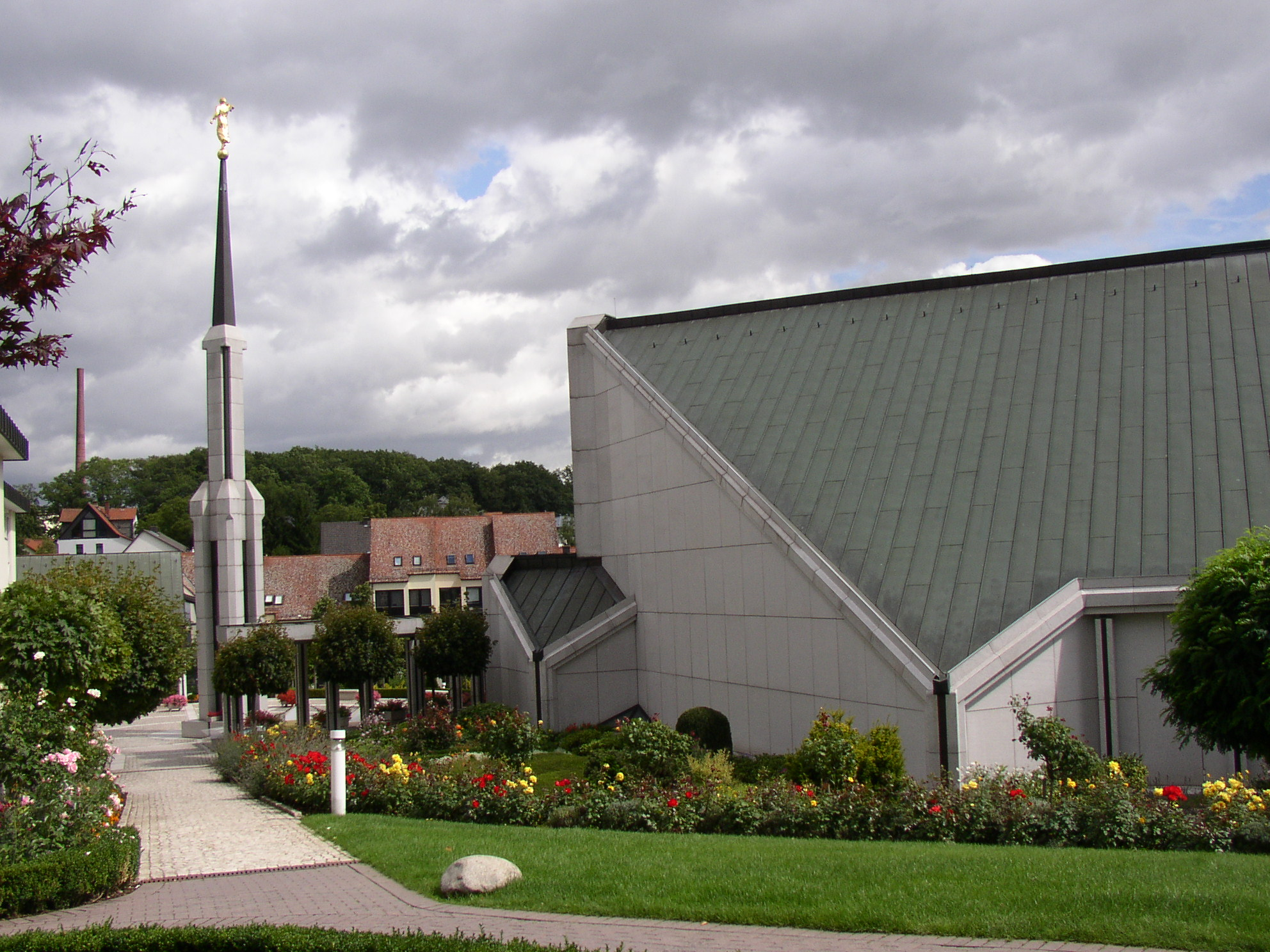
Frankfurt Germany Temple

Temple	Number	Dedicated	Square Feet	Ordinance Rooms	Sealing Rooms
Boise Idaho Temple	27	1984	35,325	4	4
Manila Philippines Temple	29	1984	26,683	4	3
Dallas Texas Temple	30	1984	46,956	5	5
Taipei Taiwan Temple	31	1984	16,000	4	3
Guatemala City Guatemala Temple	32	1984	11,610	4	3
Stockholm Sweden Temple	34	1985	14,508	4	3
Chicago Illinois Temple	35	1985	29,751	5	4
Johannesburg South Africa Temple	36	1985	19,184	4	3
Seoul Korea Temple	37	1985	28,057	4	3
Lima Peru Temple	38	1986	9,600	4	3
Buenos Aires Argentina Temple	39	1986	17,683	4	3
Frankfurt Germany Temple	41	1987	24,170	4	5
Portland Oregon Temple	42	1989	79,220	4	14
Las Vegas Nevada Temple	43	1989	80,350	4	6

=== Classic modern, single-spire design ===
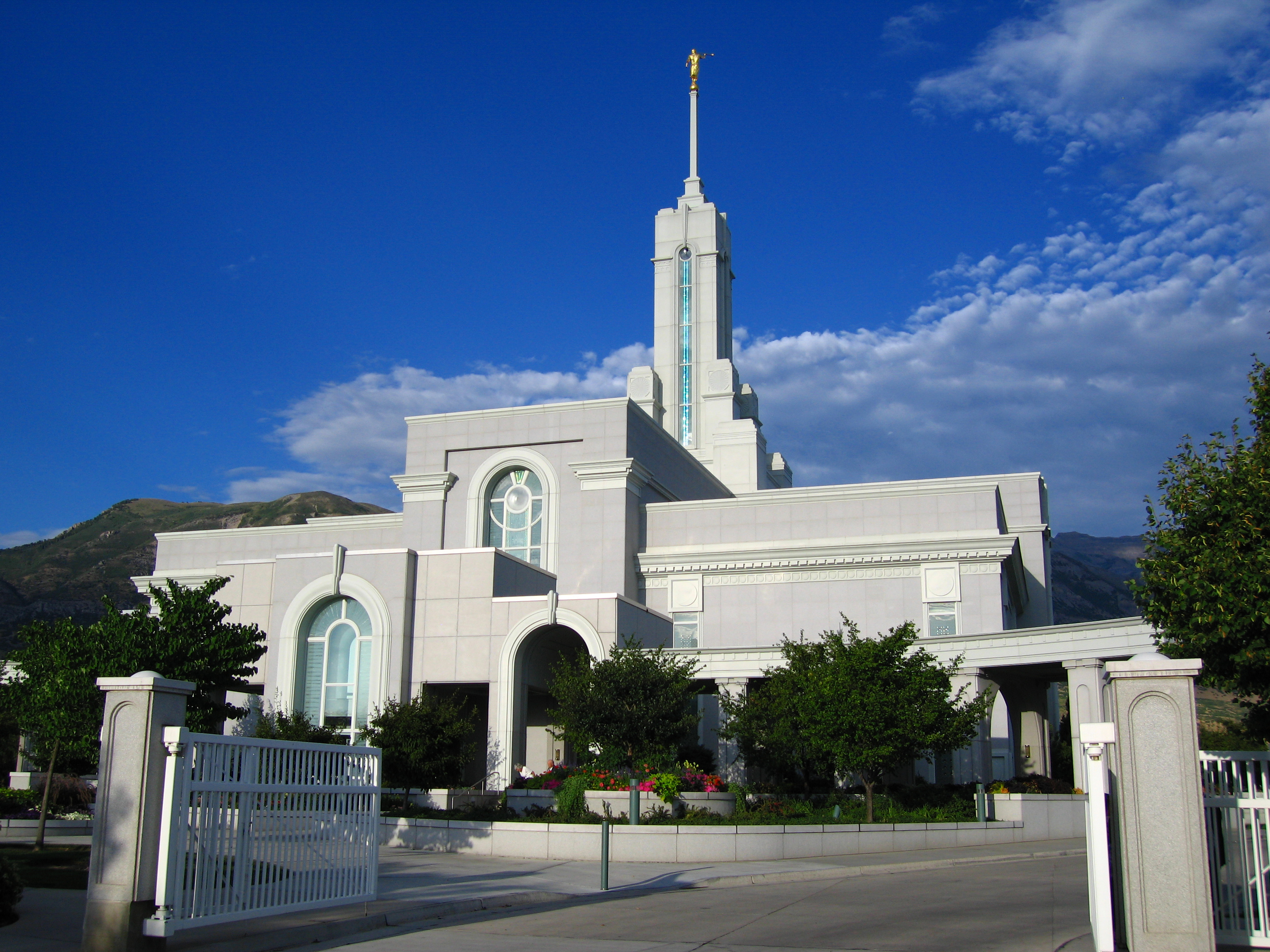
Mount Timpanogos Utah Temple, the largest temple built from a general set of plans

The classic modern, single-spire design initiated a period when temples squared off the roof and returned to a single-spire design. These temples tended to be larger—with the smallest at 45,800 sq ft (4,250 m^{2}), and the largest at 104,000 sq ft (9,700 m^{2})— relative to the earlier six-spire designs, with the smallest temple at 9,600 sq ft (890 m^{2}) and the largest at 80,350 sq ft (7,465 m^{2}). All of the temples built with this design were dedicated between 1994 and 1999, except for the Campinas Brazil Temple, which was dedicated in 2002.

Temple	Number	Dedicated	Square feet	Ordinance rooms	Sealing rooms
Orlando Florida Temple	46	1994	70,000	4	5
Bountiful Utah Temple	47	1995	104,000	4	8
Mount Timpanogos Utah Temple	49	1996	107,000	4	8
Madrid Spain Temple	56	1999	45,800	4	4
Bogotá Colombia Temple	57	1999	53,500	4	3
Guayaquil Ecuador Temple	58	1999	70,884	4	3
Campinas Brazil Temple	111	2002	48,100	4	3

=== Smaller design ===
In October 1997, the LDS Church president Gordon B. Hinckley announced a plan to build smaller temples that would provide the same functionality as larger temples, but would typically be built in areas not suited for the church's previous larger temples. The new temples were built next to existing chapels, to share both office space and parking facilities. As well as lacking offices, these temples have no laundry facilities or waiting rooms, and they have small changing rooms. The design is 6,800 sq ft (630 m^{2}) in area; it includes a single ordinance room that acts as the Creation, Garden, World, and Terrestrial Rooms, leading to the adjacent Celestial Room. A sealing room and small baptistery are also included.

The Monticello Utah Temple (53) was the first of the new generation of smaller temples to be completed, opening in July 1998. It was followed in 1999 by the Anchorage Alaska Temple (54) in January and the Colonia Juárez Chihuahua Mexico Temple (55) in March. The original size proved inadequate for the Monticello and the Anchorage temples, so 4,000 sq ft (370 m^{2}) were added, for Monticello in 2002 and for Anchorage in 2004. The additional space included a second ordinance room and sealing room; a waiting room; offices for temple workers; and laundry facilities. These additions increased the size of each temple to 11,937 sq ft (1,109.0 m^{2}). The Colonia Juárez temple retains the original design and remains the smallest temple built by the Church.

==== Identical design ====
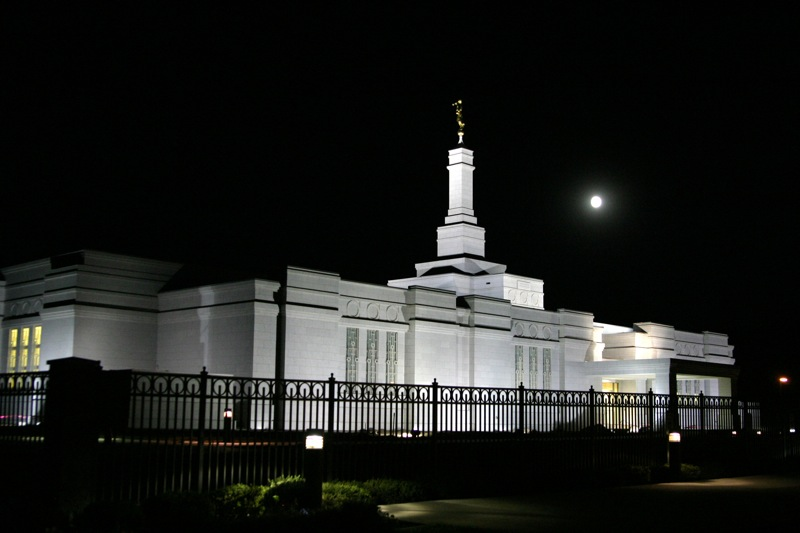
Spokane Washington Temple

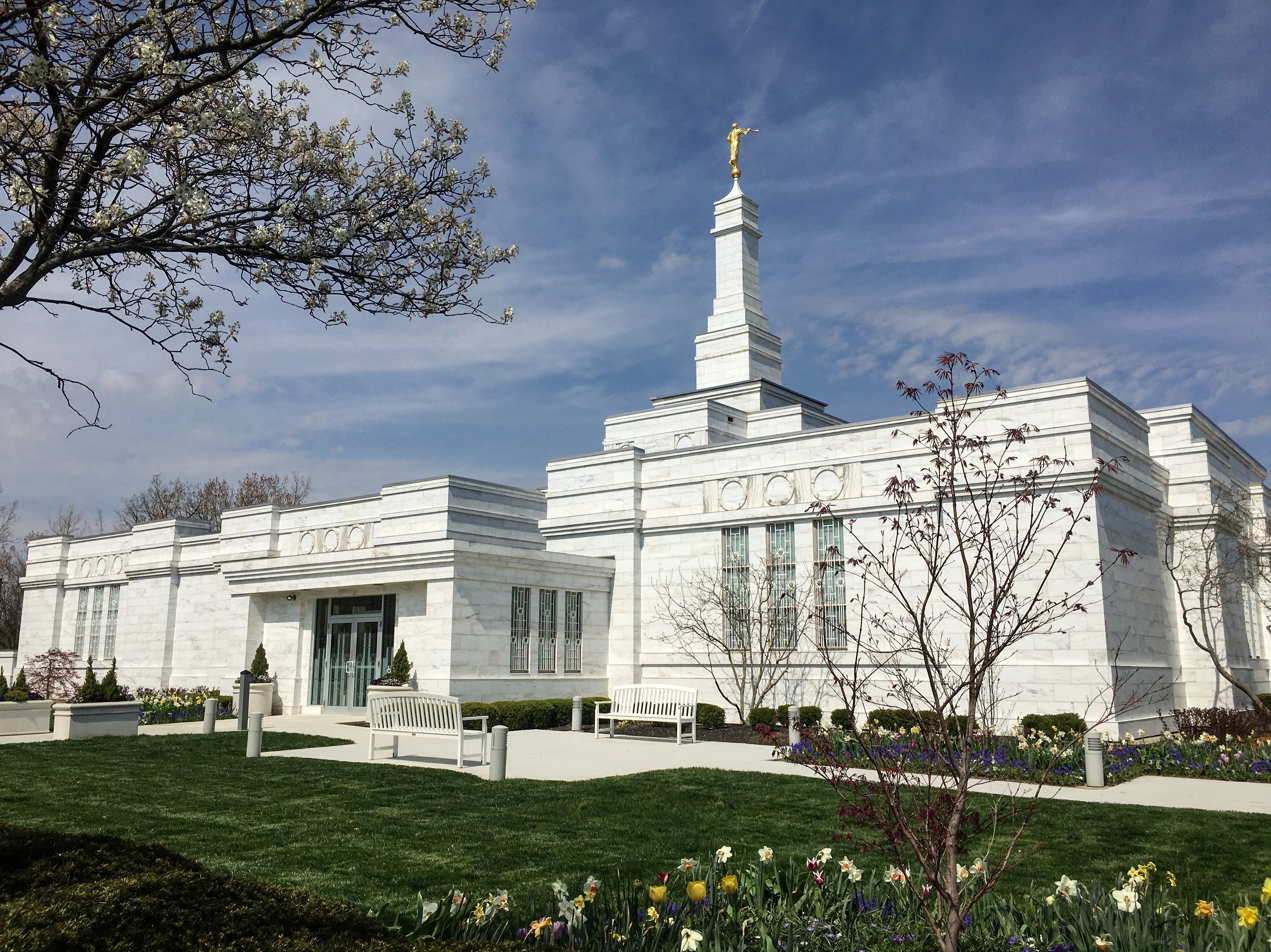
Columbus Ohio Temple

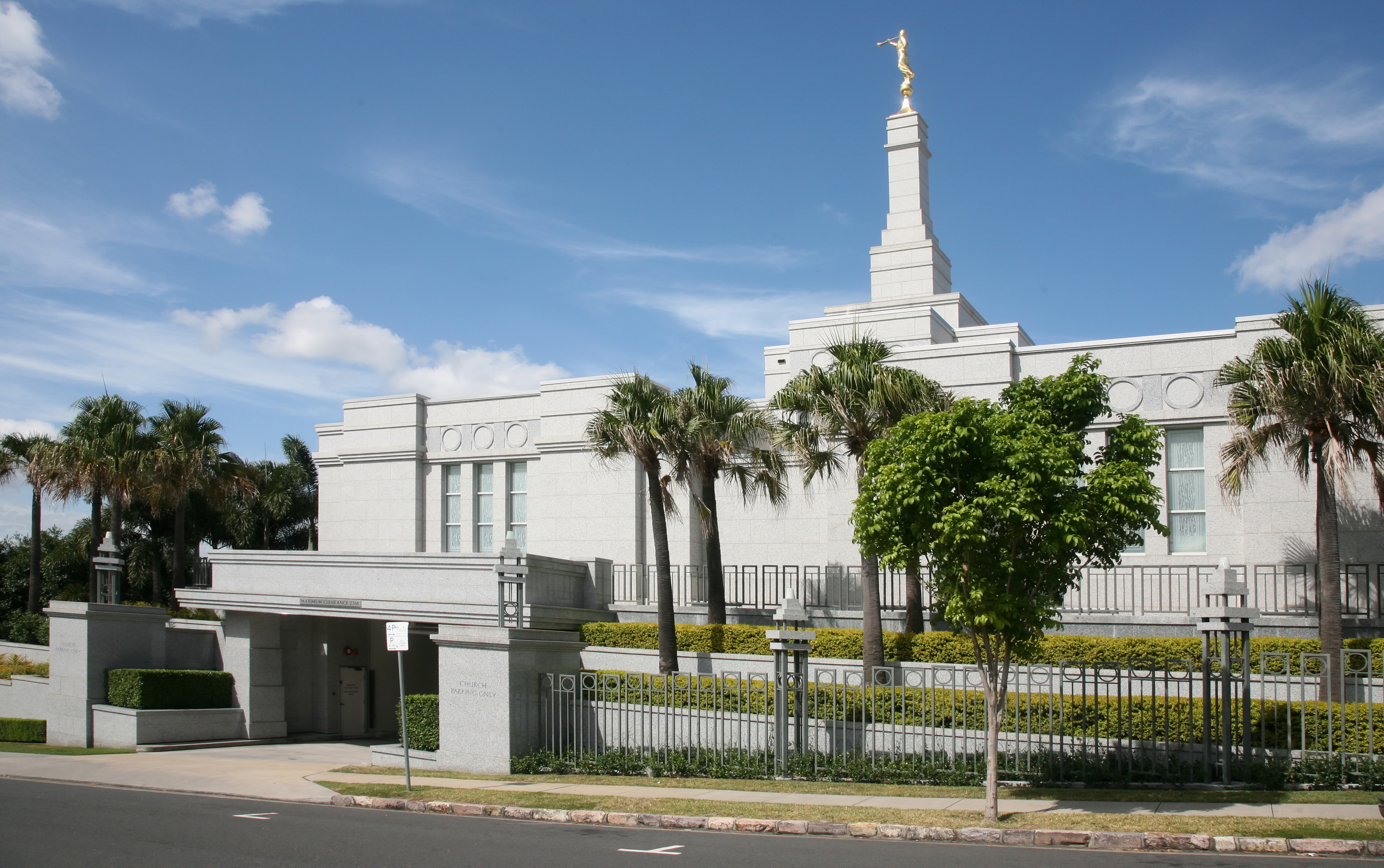
Brisbane Australia Temple

In April 1998, just six months after announcing the plan to build smaller temples, Hinckley announced plans to immediately begin construction of 32 additional temples, with details to follow a consideration of needs; the goal was to have 100 temples in operation by the year 2000. This announcement kicked off an aggressive building cycle, using relatively identical models and floor plans. Described as having a "classic modern, single-spire design," these temples have two progressive ordinance rooms and two sealing rooms. The total floor area for these temples is 10,700 sq ft (990 m^{2}). The exteriors use slightly different finishes. Most are granite or marble from regional quarries—for example, Imperial Danby White variegated marble quarried in Vermont, which was used in many LDS Church temples in the United States. The temples built in Australia and Fiji used granite imported from Italy. Other than minor variations in finish, landscaping, and setting, these temples are almost identical. A total of 38 temples were built between 1999 and 2003 using this design. The Columbus Ohio Temple was the first temple designated to use this floor plan, just a few weeks after Hinckley's initial announcement. The Spokane Washington Temple, dedicated in August 1999, was the first of this design to be completed.

===== Identical temples =====
- Spokane Washington Temple (59)
- Columbus Ohio Temple (60)
- Bismarck North Dakota Temple (61)
- Columbia South Carolina Temple (62)
- Detroit Michigan Temple (63)
- Halifax Nova Scotia Temple (64)
- Regina Saskatchewan Temple (65)
- Edmonton Alberta Temple (67)
- Raleigh North Carolina Temple (68)
- St. Paul Minnesota Temple (69)
- Kona Hawaii Temple (70)
- Ciudad Juárez Mexico Temple (71)
- Oaxaca Mexico Temple (74)
- Tuxtla Gutiérrez Mexico Temple (75)
- Louisville Kentucky Temple (76)
- Palmyra New York Temple (77)
- Fresno California Temple (78)
- Medford Oregon Temple (79)
- Memphis Tennessee Temple (80)
- Reno Nevada Temple (81)
- Tampico Mexico Temple (83)
- Nashville Tennessee Temple (84)
- Villahermosa Mexico Temple (85)
- Montreal Quebec Temple (86)
- San José Costa Rica Temple (87)
- Adelaide Australia Temple (89)
- Melbourne Australia Temple (90)
- Suva Fiji Temple (91)
- Mérida Mexico Temple (92)
- Veracruz Mexico Temple (93)
- Baton Rouge Louisiana Temple (94)
- Birmingham Alabama Temple (98)
- Porto Alegre Brazil Temple (102)
- Montevideo Uruguay Temple (103)
- Guadalajara Mexico Temple (105)
- Perth Australia Temple (106)
- Asunción Paraguay Temple (112)
- Brisbane Australia Temple (115)

==== Variations in design ====
Occasionally the LDS Church changed the design slightly, adding or removing square footage, but keeping the overall design the same, with two ordinance rooms and two sealing rooms. Other temples show distinct modifications of their exterior and size.

- Hermosillo Sonora Mexico Temple (72)
- Fukuoka Japan Temple (88)
- Oklahoma City Oklahoma Temple (95)
- Caracas Venezuela Temple (96)
- Winter Quarters Nebraska Temple (104)
- Columbia River Washington Temple (107)
- Snowflake Arizona Temple (108)
- Lubbock Texas Temple (109)
- Monterrey Mexico Temple (110)
- The Hague Netherlands Temple (114)
- Accra Ghana Temple (117)
- San Antonio Texas Temple (120)
- Aba Nigeria Temple (121)
- Helsinki Finland Temple (124)

==== Additional sealing room ====
The LDS Church built several temples based on the original design with two ordinance rooms, but it added square footage to accommodate an additional sealing room. These temples vary in size and style, although some resemble the original design. Often plans were modified because local residents objected to such a large temple in their neighborhood. For example, the Sacramento Temple was originally designed to be much larger, but because of opposition from residents, the design was changed to reflect the Newport Beach Temple design.

These temples vary in size. The newest three temples are about 17,000–19,000 sq ft (1,600–1,800 m^{2}) in area, and the others are about 34,000 sq ft (3,200 m^{2}).

- Billings Montana Temple (66)
- Albuquerque New Mexico Temple (73)
- Cochabamba Bolivia Temple (82)
- Houston Texas Temple (97)
- Recife Brazil Temple (101)
- Redlands California Temple (116)
- Newport Beach California Temple (122)
- Sacramento California Temple (123)

== Other styles ==
=== Unique designs ===
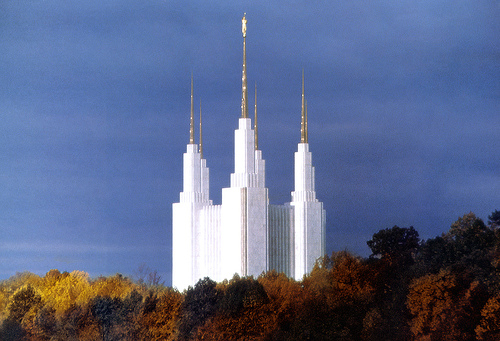
Washington D.C. Temple

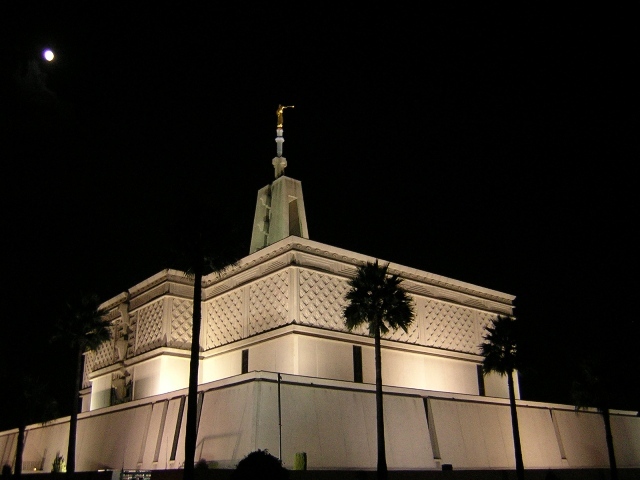
Mexico City Mexico Temple

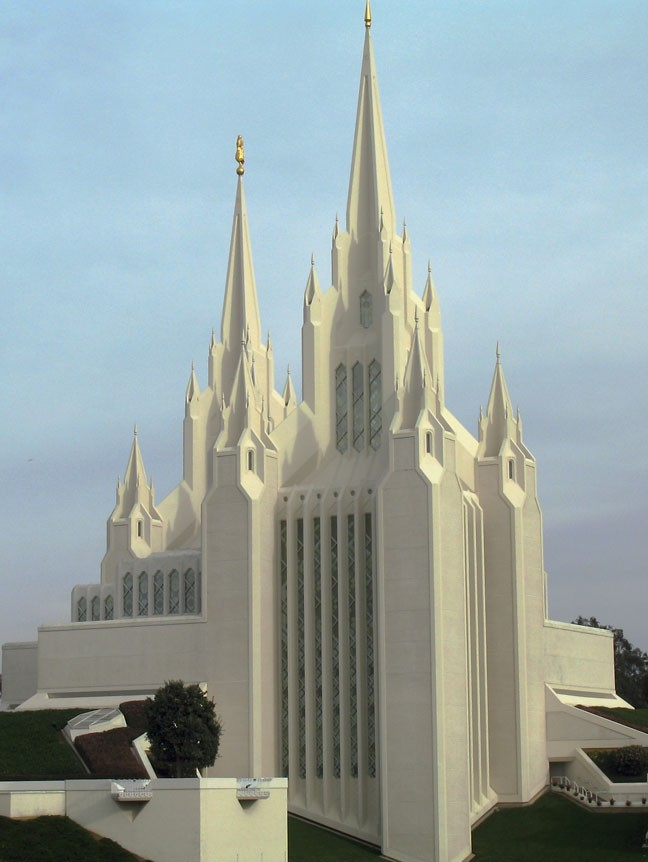
San Diego California Temple

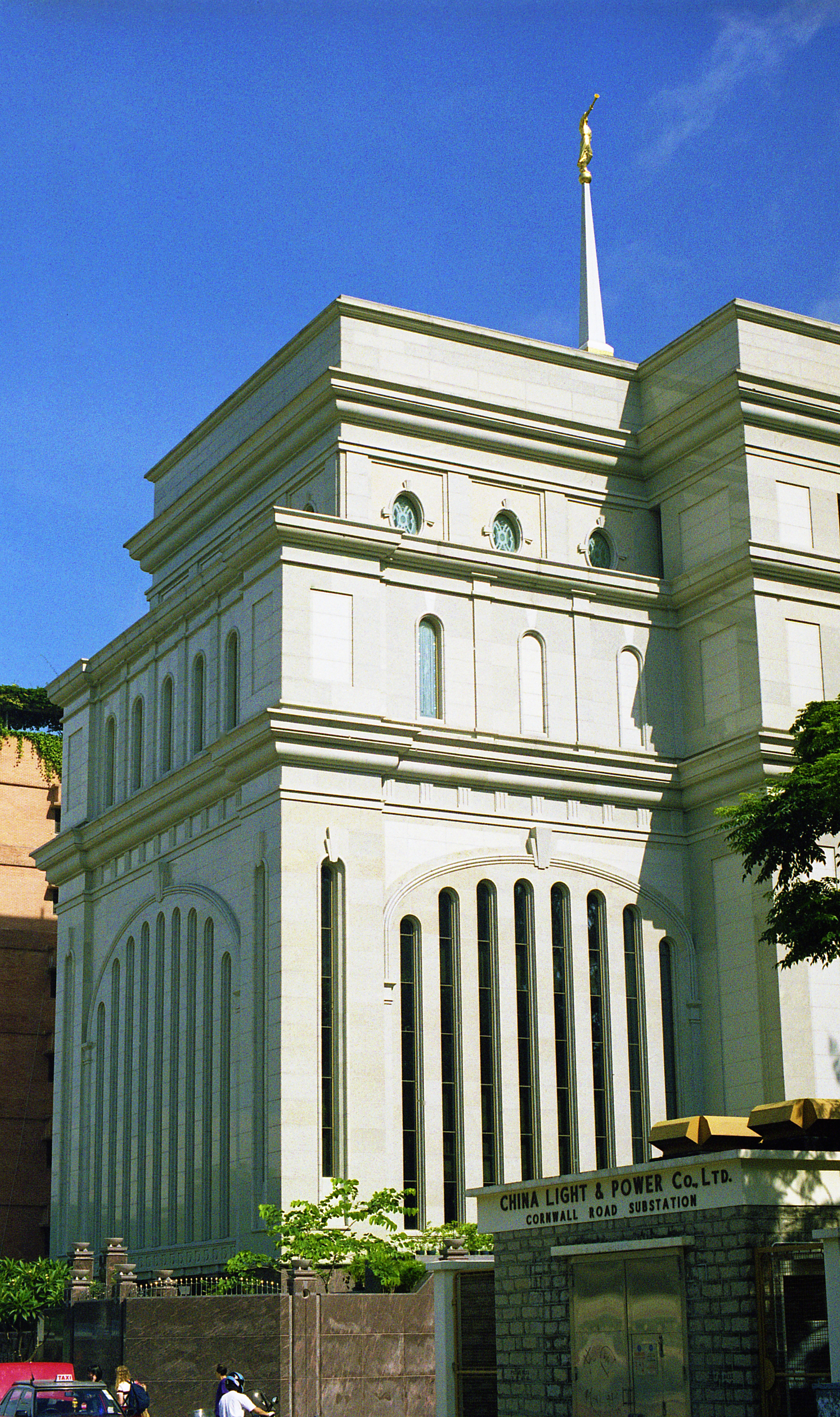
Hong Kong China Temple

==== Washington D.C. Temple ====
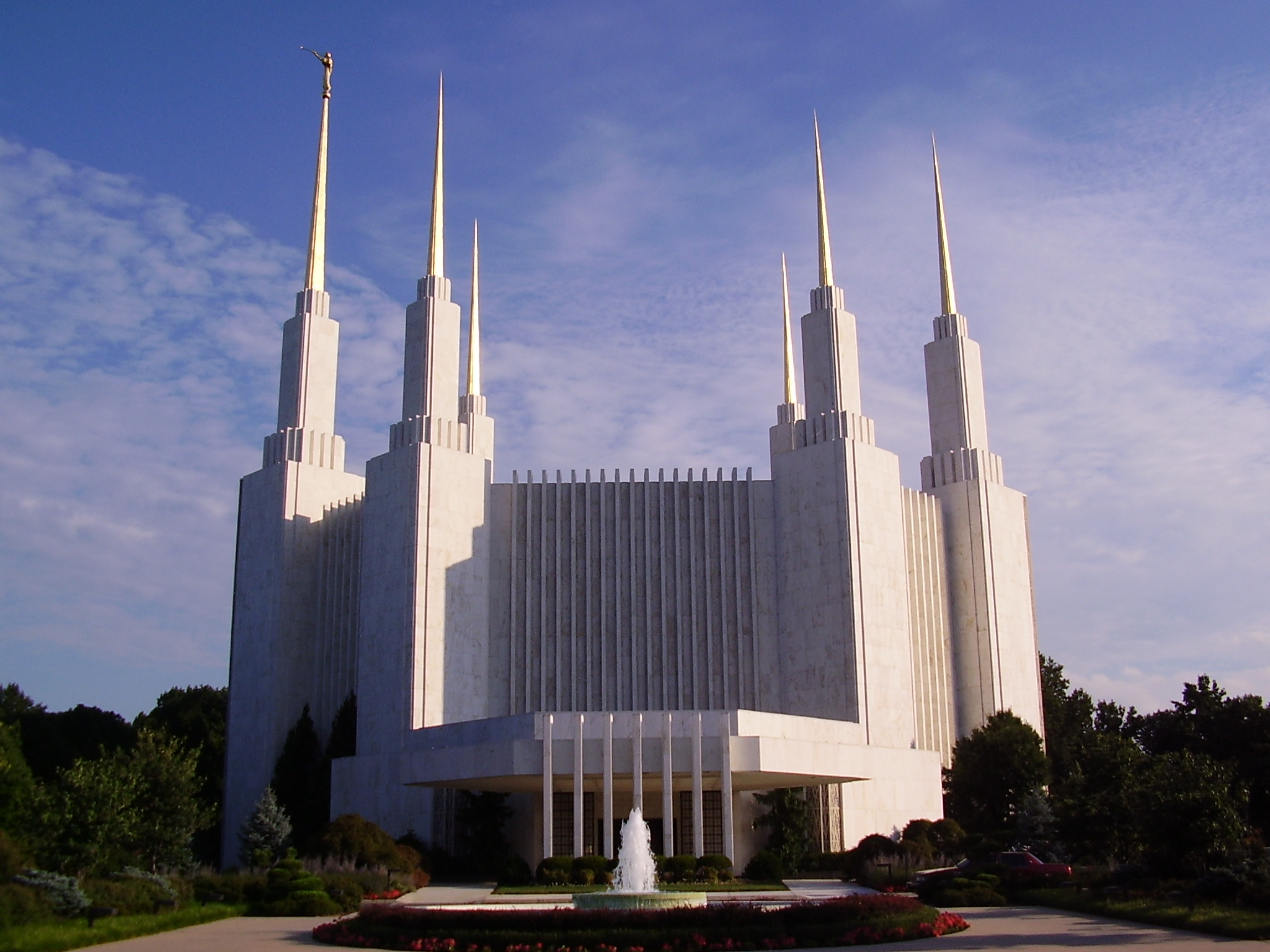
Washington D.C. Temple

The Washington D.C. Temple (16), located in Kensington, Maryland, was the first temple built on the east coast of the United States. It was built with a modern six-spire design; the three towers to the east represent the Melchizedek Priesthood leadership, and the three towers to the west represent the Aaronic Priesthood leadership. The central eastern tower reaches a height of 288 ft (88 m), the tallest of any LDS Church temple.

A large plot of land on a wooded hill was purchased in 1962, and eleven acres were cleared for the temple. The rest of this land was left untouched to give the temple a remote feeling. The temple was designed to be similar in style and form to the Salt Lake Temple so that it would be easily recognized as a temple of the LDS Church. The Angel Moroni statue, which stands on top of the tallest tower, is 18 ft (5.5 m) tall and weighs 4,000 pounds (1,800 kg). Although the temple appears to have no windows, the thinly cut marble is translucent from the interior.. The Washington temple has a total floor area of 160,000 sq ft (15,000 m^{2}), which is the third largest of any LDS Church temple. It contains six ordinance rooms and fourteen sealing rooms.

==== Mexico City Mexico Temple ====
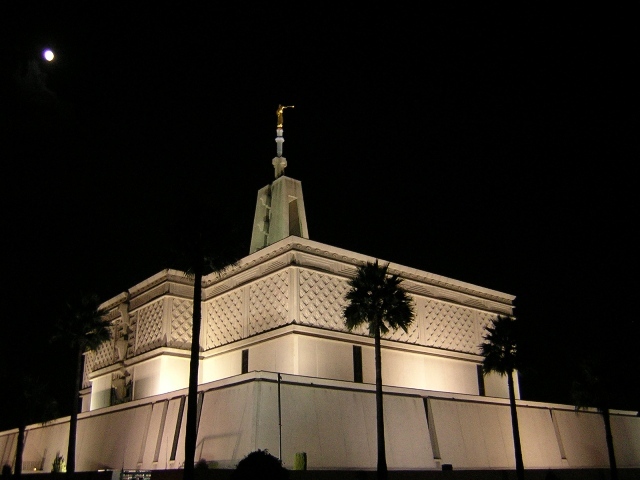
Mexico City Mexico Temple

The Mexico City Mexico Temple (26) is located in the northeastern part of Mexico City. The temple is heavily influenced by Mayan Revival architecture, having Aztec and Mayan elements, but it still resembles the center spire design. It is the largest LDS Church temple outside the United States.

The temple was built on a 7-acre (2.8 ha) plot; it contains four ordinance rooms and eleven sealing rooms; and it has a total floor area of 116,642 sq ft (10,836.4 m^{2}). It was the first of twelve LDS Church temples built in Mexico.

==== San Diego California Temple ====
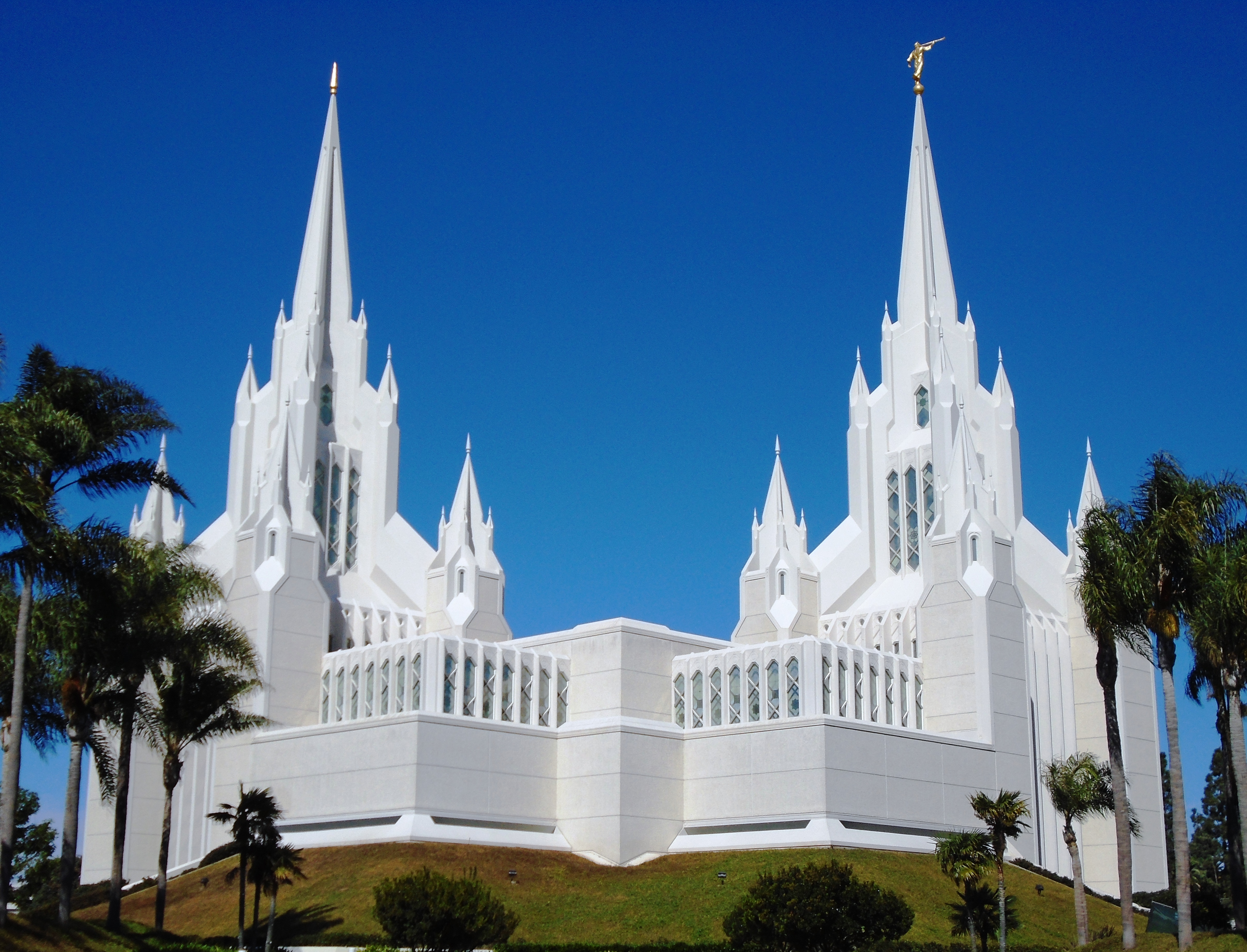
San Diego California Temple

The San Diego California Temple (45) is located in the La Jolla district of San Diego. It was built with two main spires, but the four smaller spires at the base of each main spire are unique to this temple. The east spire is topped by a statue of the Angel Moroni, which adorns most LDS Church temples.

The exterior finish consists of marble chips in plaster, giving the building a bright white glow. Just off Interstate 5, the temple is a prominent landmark for drivers passing San Diego. The temple is brightly illuminated at night.

The temple was built on a 7.2-acre (2.9 ha) plot; it has four ordinance rooms and eight sealing rooms; and it has a total floor area of 72,000 sq ft (6,700 m^{2}).

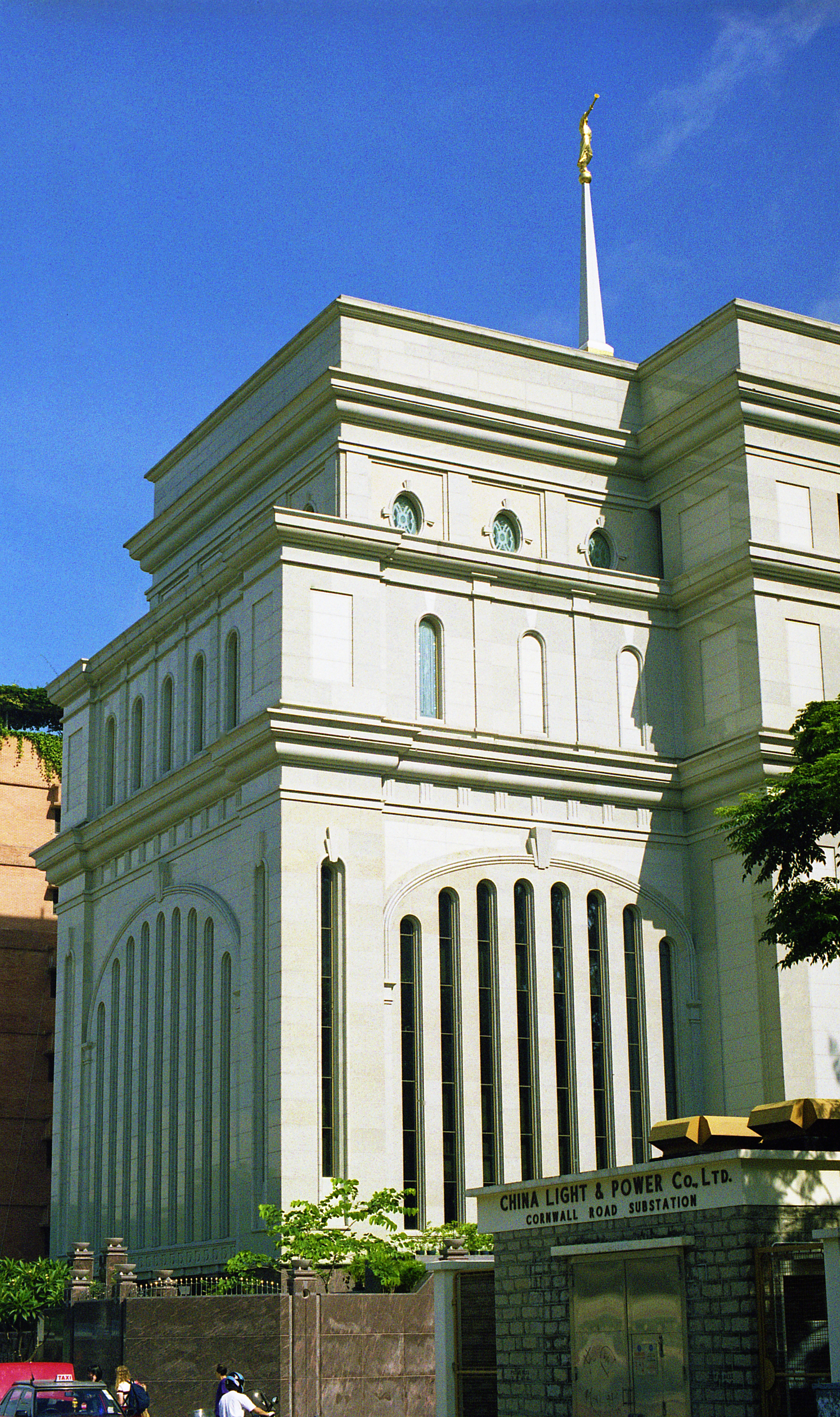
Hong Kong China Temple

==== Hong Kong China Temple ====
The Hong Kong China Temple (48) was built on the site of an existing LDS Church mission home and meetinghouse. Because of the density in Hong Kong, the temple had to be built vertically rather than horizontally, which contributed to the temple's unique design. The six-story building is designed to house not only the temple, but also a chapel, mission offices, and living quarters for the temple president and several missionaries. This arrangement resembles that of the Manhattan New York Temple, which was adapted from an existing building.

The Hong Kong temple has a total of 21,744 sq ft (2,020.1 m^{2}), two ordinance rooms, and two sealing rooms.

=== Adapted buildings ===
==== Vernal Utah Temple ====
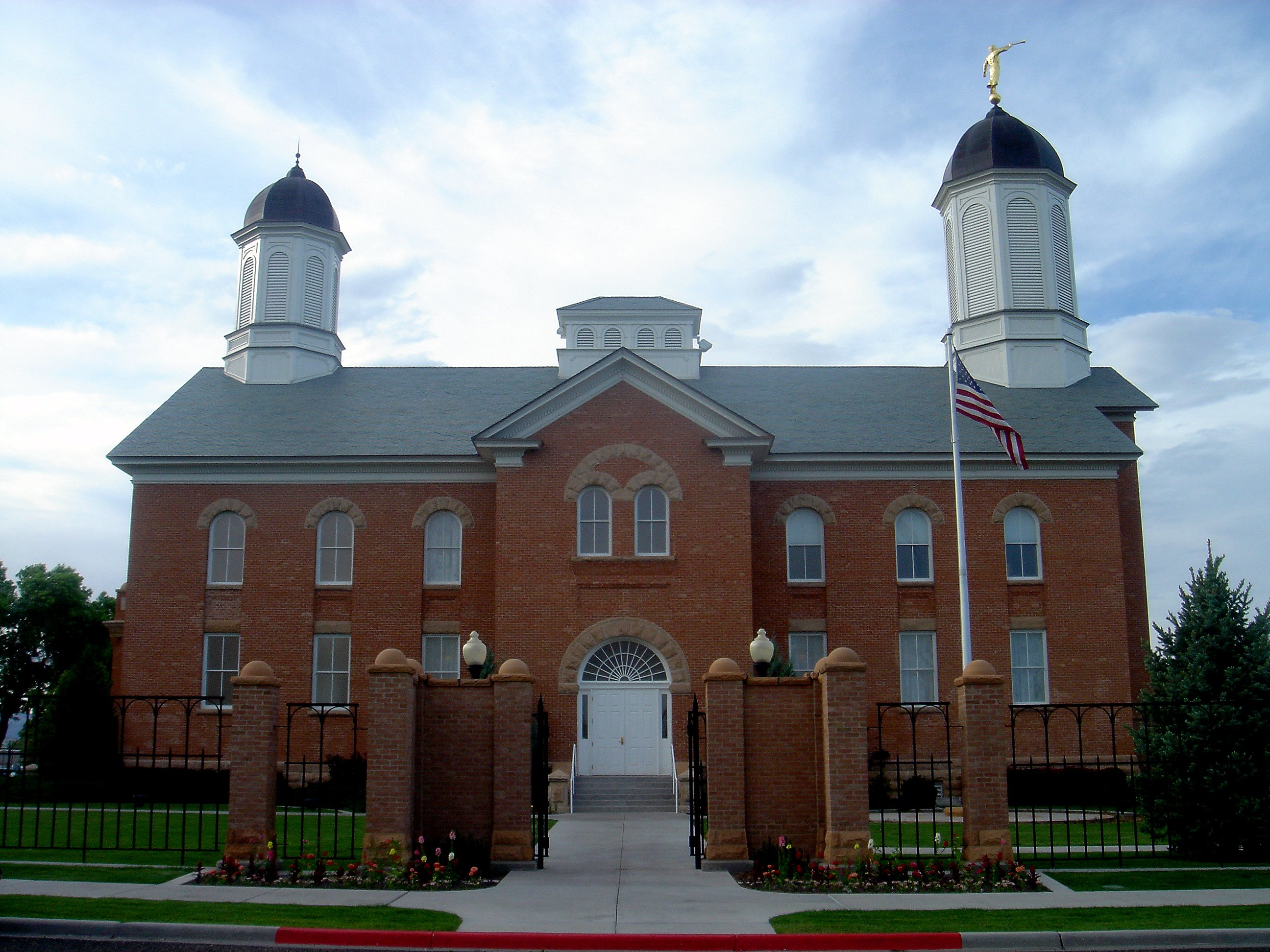
Vernal Utah Temple

Originally, the Vernal Utah Temple (51) served as the Uintah Stake Tabernacle for Latter-day Saints in eastern Utah. The tabernacle's foundation was constructed of nearby sandstone, with walls built of four layers of fired brick from local clay. Constructed using considerable donated labor starting in the fall of 1899, the tabernacle was dedicated on August 24, 1907, by the church president Joseph F. Smith. Smith reportedly said he would not be surprised if a temple was built there someday.

Roger Jackson characterized the Uintah Stake Tabernacle as relatively modest, without the decorative details found on tabernacles in central and northern Utah. Nonetheless, he wrote, "the building is the most prominent structure in Vernal and considered the finest building in all of eastern Utah." The tabernacle was superseded by an adjacent, more modern LDS Church stake center in 1948. Used only irregularly thereafter, the LDS Church announced the tabernacle's closing in 1984 for public safety reasons. Among other reasons, the tabernacle lacked indoor bathrooms and access for the disabled.

A local committee was formed to "Save the Tabernacle", and a preservation study was prepared in 1989. The LDS Church decided to convert the building to a smaller temple, and plans were announced in 1994. The conversion preserved the exterior, brought the building up to code, and altered the floor plan; in addition, the eastern spire of the temple was elongated to be taller than the spire of the neighboring stake center. An east-facing golden statue of Angel Moroni was placed on top of the spire. When discussing the problems involved in converting an old, deteriorated building into an acceptable modern temple, the LDS Church president Gordon B. Hinckley remarked that the church would never attempt such a conversion again.

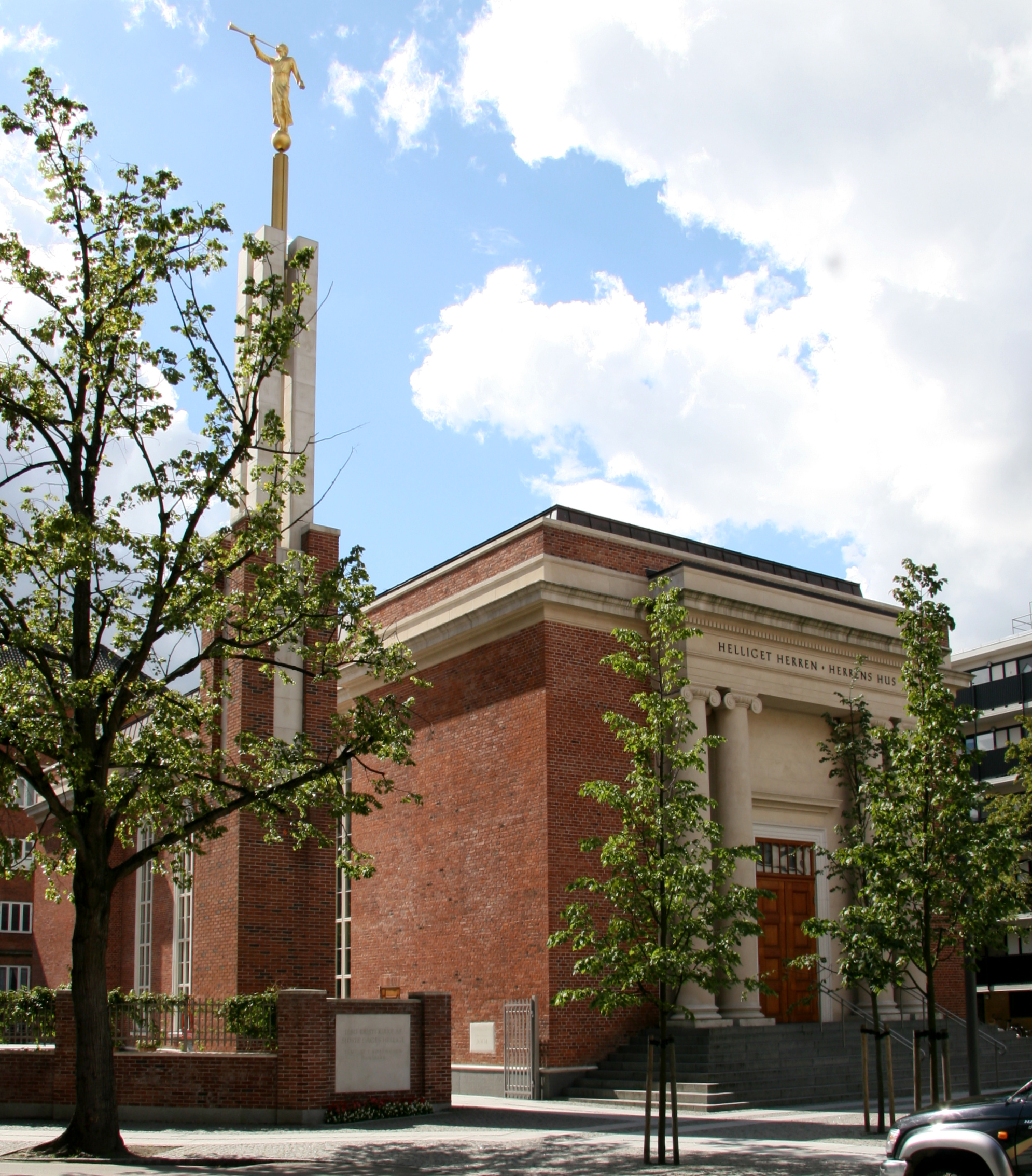
Copenhagen Denmark Temple

==== Copenhagen Denmark Temple ====
The Copenhagen Denmark Temple (118) is a renovation of a pre-existing building, the Priorvej Chapel. This chapel was built by Church members in 1931 and was dedicated by John A. Widtsoe, a member of the Quorum of the Twelve Apostles. The chapel was built in the Neoclassical style, with columns in front. The renovation focused on the interior, since the Church wanted the structure to keep its original exterior appearance.

The day that the chapel was dedicated, June 14, 1931, was the eighty-first anniversary of the arrival of the first Mormon missionaries in Denmark. During World War II, the chapel was used as a bomb shelter, but the building survived with little damage. After World War II, the chapel was remodeled to hold more classrooms for the growing Church membership. The Copenhagen Denmark Temple has a total of 25,000 sq ft (2,300 m^{2}), two ordinance rooms, and two sealing rooms.

==== Manhattan New York Temple ====
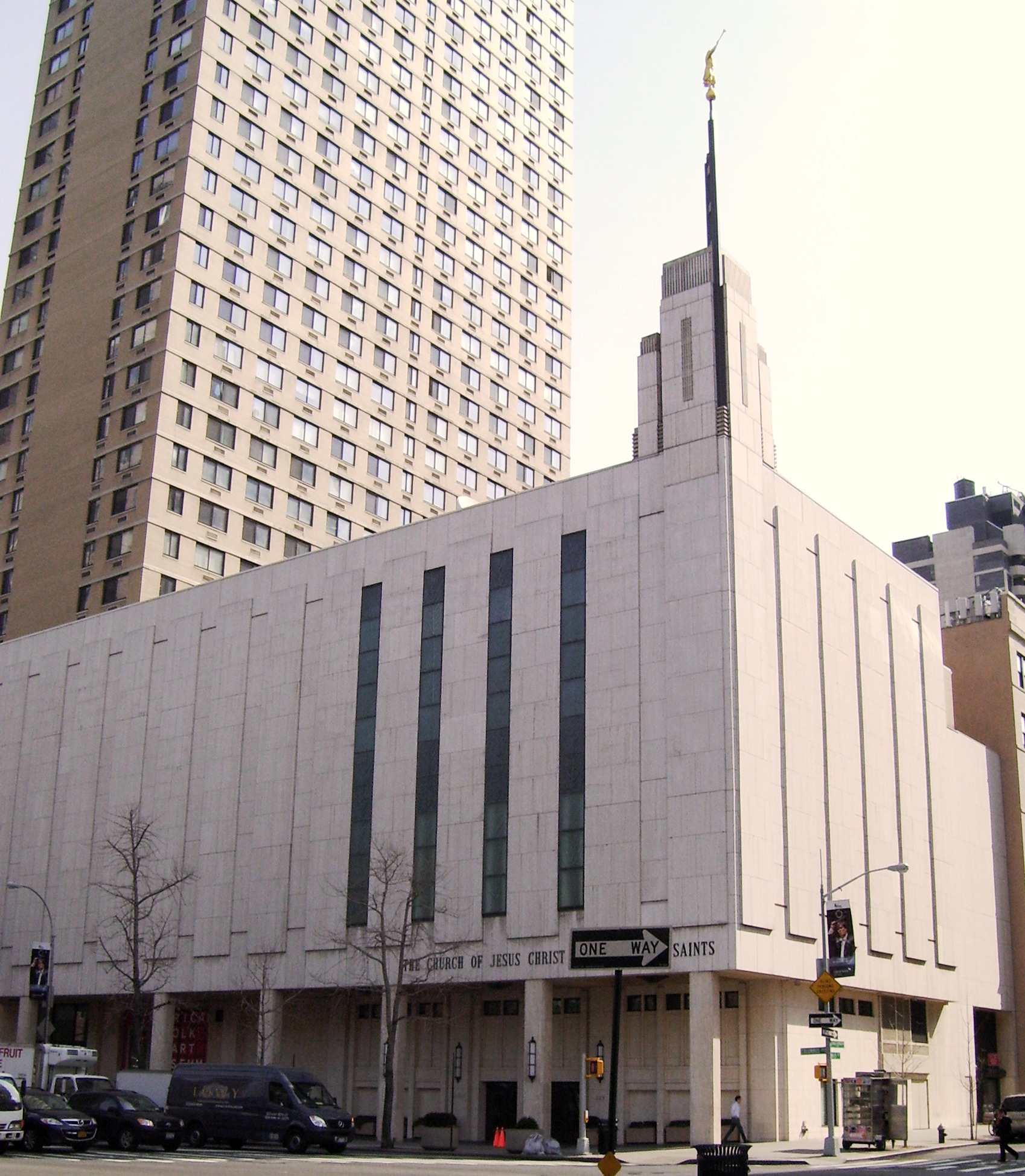
Manhattan New York Temple

The Manhattan New York Temple (119) was adapted from an existing stake center building, which stands at the intersection of West 65th Street, Broadway, and Columbus Avenue, and is across the street from Lincoln Center. The original building was dedicated by Spencer W. Kimball in May 1975; it houses a public affairs office on the second floor and a chapel on the third floor.

The temple occupies parts of the first floor and all of the fourth, fifth, and sixth floors of the building. The interiors of these floors were completely renovated. The walls were soundproofed so that traffic noise would not interrupt temple patrons. The total floor area of the temple portion of the building is 20,630 sq ft (1,917 m^{2}), with two progressive ordinance rooms and two sealing rooms. Unlike many smaller temples built since the pilot program, the ordinance rooms are perpendicular to each other to accommodate the limited size of the building. The cornerstone containing the year of dedication—found on the facade of most temples—is located in the interior lobby next to the elevator that leads to the chapel. Inside the temple, beehives are carved into the molding, and door handles resembling the Statue of Liberty's torch are found throughout the building. Paintings on the walls of many rooms depict scenes from nature.

After the temple's dedication, a special ceremony was held and a time capsule was placed into the cornerstone. The capsule's contents included secular memorabilia, such as a copy of the New York Times, and LDS Church memorabilia—such as a set of scriptures, a handkerchief used during the dedication ceremony, and sheet music. A steeple and a statue of the Angel Moroni would be added to the building that autumn. On October 9, 2004, thousands of people visited to watch the ten-foot statue be placed on top of the steeple.

In a local LDS Church conference on November 12, 2006, it was officially announced that the temple's fourth floor, which formerly housed classrooms and offices associated with the third-floor chapel and the old stake center, would be converted into part of the temple. This construction was completed during the temple's maintenance closure in August 2007. The temple baptistery continues to occupy part of the first floor of the building, and the rest of the temple occupies all of the fourth, fifth, and sixth floors. The third floor is a chapel for local congregations, and the second floor houses a public affairs office and a Family History Center. (The Family History Center that was located in the building before temple adaptation was one of the most-used such centers in the world.) The fourth floor includes clothing rental facilities.

Provo City Center Temple

==== Provo City Center Temple ====
On October 1, 2011, it was announced at the LDS Church's general conference that the Provo Tabernacle would be converted into Provo's second temple. Completed in 2016, the Provo City Center Temple uses much of the tabernacle's original shell, all that remained of the building after a fire in December 2010.

=== Neoclassical temples ===
During a 2011 devotional service at Brigham Young University—Idaho, Thomas E. Coburn, managing director of the LDS Church's temple department, explained that church president Thomas S. Monson and the department were beginning to build temples according to the "timeless" and classical designs of the cultures and people they will serve, citing the architectural rendering of the Philadelphia Pennsylvania Temple as the first of many examples. This trend towards Neoclassicism appears to be the latest in LDS Church temple architecture. The Indianapolis Indiana Temple—with a central spire design reminiscent of downtown structures such as the Indianapolis Soldiers' and Sailors' Monument and the Indiana World War Memorial Plaza—is another example.

== See also ==
- Comparison of temples (LDS Church)
- List of temples (LDS Church)
- List of temples by geographic region (LDS Church)
- Architecture of the Church of Jesus Christ of Latter-day Saints
- Temple (Latter Day Saints)
- Temple (LDS Church)
- The Church of Jesus Christ of Latter-day Saints
- Mormonism and Freemasonry
