= Dover Amendment =

Massachusetts law limiting zoning powers

The Dover Amendment is the common name for Massachusetts General Law (MGL) Chapter 40A, Section 3. This law exempts agricultural, religious, and educational uses from certain zoning restrictions. By limiting what zoning requirements apply to land and structures that hold these uses, the Dover Amendment makes it easier for these uses to build structures to serve their needs. The Dover Amendment allows many developers to build facilities that are substantially larger than zoning laws would ordinarily allow or which would be considered inappropriate, by some, for the neighborhood.

Considered by many to be overly broad, the exemption granted by the Dover Amendment has been narrowed somewhat by recent court decisions. While a corporation must merely be nonprofit and legally able to engage in educational activities to be considered a "nonprofit educational corporation", the actual use of a particular facility must have education as the “primary or dominant purpose" to qualify for Dover protection.

== Exemptions ==
It is unclear whether the city of Boston is exempt from the Dover Amendment. The Boston Globe has referred to an exemption for the city on occasion. The Massachusetts General Court approved exemptions for the City of Cambridge (Acts of 1979, Chap. 565 and Acts of 1980, Chap. 387) allowing it to regulate educational and religious uses of property, which Cambridge then incorporated into its zoning laws.
