= Easter in Portland, Oregon =

Annual holy day activities

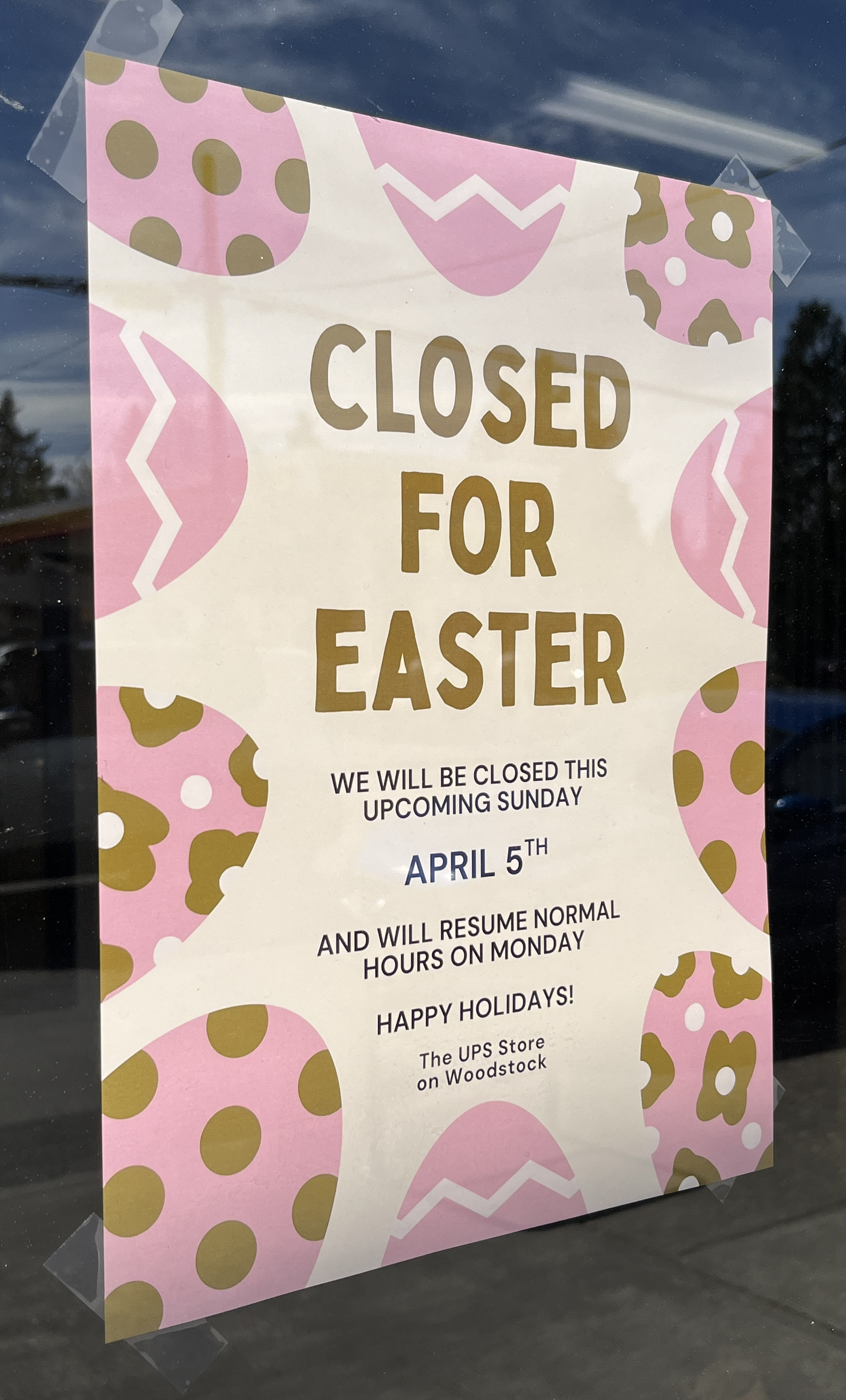
Sign noting a business closure for Easter in Portland, Oregon, 2026

Easter in Portland, Oregon is celebrated annually. The Christian holy day is represented by religious and secular Easter traditions and activities in the city, including costumed bar crawls, brunches, Easter Bunny appearances, and community Easter egg hunts.

== Events and activities ==
The Oregon Rail Heritage Center's Easter Bunny Express features a train ride along the Springwater Corridor with an appearance by the Easter Bunny and a scavenger hunt. The Oregon Zoo has traditionally hosted the "Rabbit Romp", which was later dubbed "Hop into Spring". The event features animal encounters, handicraft, lawn games, and magic shows. A spokesperson for the zoo said the event attracted approximately 12,500 people in 2012. The Portland Spirit has offered an Easter Sunday Cruise along the Willamette River. In 2010, the Easter Hat Parade saw participants gather at Pioneer Courthouse Square and walk in a parade along Southwest Broadway to Northwest 22nd Avenue. The Oregon Humane Society in northeast Portland has hosted Easter Bunny greetings to encourage rabbit adoption. The Lloyd Center hosted its last Easter Skate in 2026. The event featured an Easter Bunny appearance and face painting.

=== Egg hunts ===
Various locations have hosted hunts for Easter eggs, including the Oregon Zoo and Mt. Scott Park. In 2023, a local new reporter wrote: "For decades, the Sellwood Moreland Improvement League (SMILE) neighborhood association hosted a relatively small Egg Hunt at the south end of Westmoreland Park — then the COVID-19 pandemic cancelled the event for two years. But, like last year, the people at the nonprofit Sellwood Community House (SCH) revived the event at Oaks Amusement Park, and this year held it on March 8, rebranded as 'The Sellwood Moreland Egg Hunt'." The Moreland Presbyterian Church, Portland Fruit Tree, and SMILE partnered to host an egg hunt and plant sale at Oaks Amusement Park in 2024. The event has featured Easter Bunny appearances. HopeCity Church has organized an annual "code orange" egg hunt at Brentwood Park in southeast Portland's Brentwood-Darlington neighborhood. The event has seen 200 volunteers and 1,000 participants, carnival games, and Easter eggs dropped from a helicopter. There was an Easter egg hunt at Laurelhurst Park in 2026.

The Central Church of the Nazarene has hosted an egg hunt at Ed Benedict Park in southeast Portland's Lents neighborhood. Legacy Emanuel Medical Center and the Presbyterian Church of Laurelhurst have also hosted hunts. The family-operated Alpenrose Dairy hosted an annual egg hunt in southwest Portland from 1962 to 2019. Hunts were divided by age group. The "mom's hunt" featured jewelry such as earrings and rings with diamonds.

=== Food and drink ===
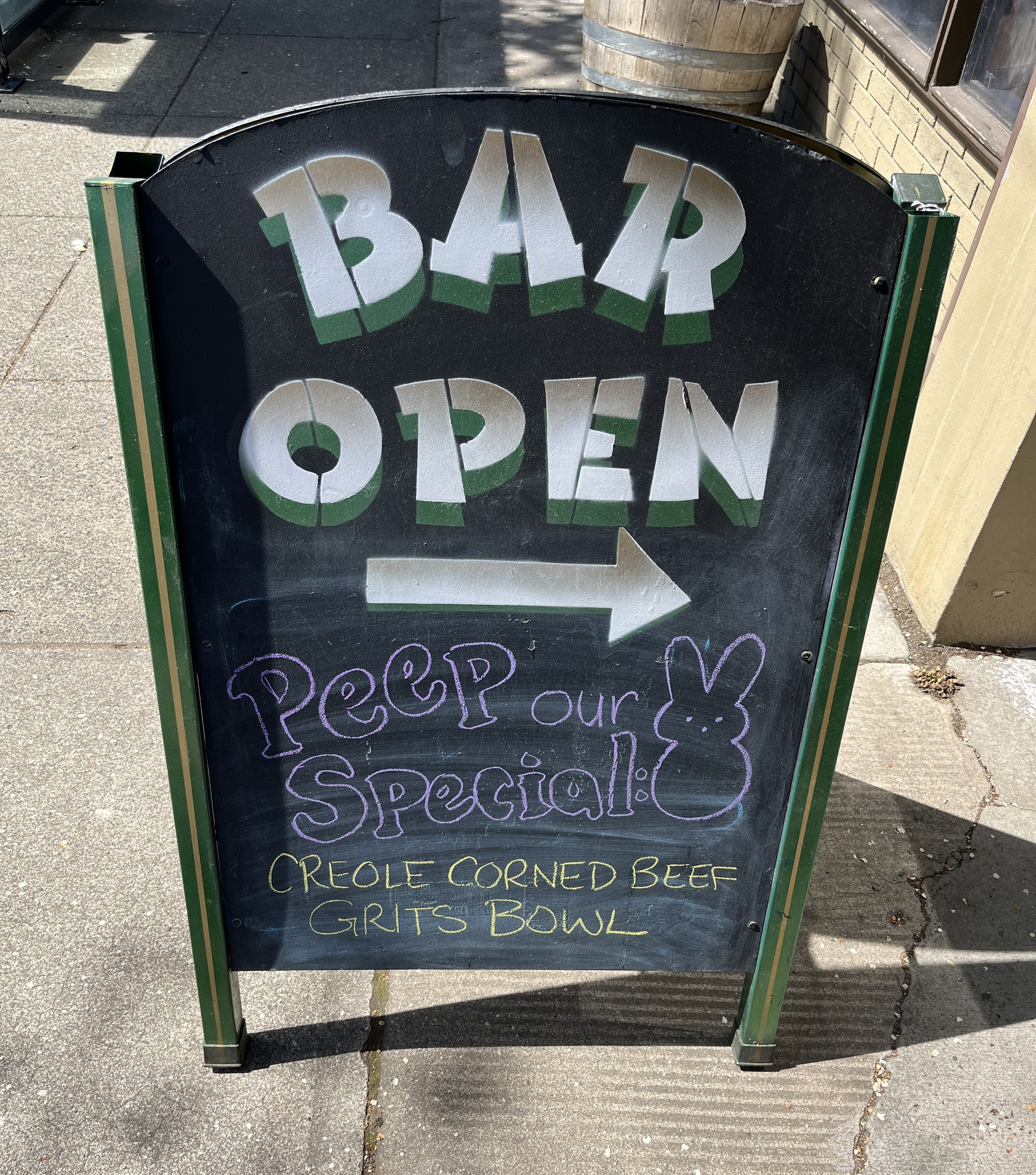
Sign promoting an Easter special outside the Delta Cafe in southeast Portland's Woodstock neighborhood, 2026

Many restaurants have offered Easter brunches and specials. In 2018, Brooke Jackson-Glidden of Eater Portland recommended Circa 33 (2010–2021), Clarklewis, Ned Ludd, Olympia Provisions, Pix Pâtisserie, and Urban Farmer for Easter. The Benson Hotel, Brix Tavern, Kennedy School, Mama Mia Trattoria, Portland City Grill, the Ritz-Carlton, and Salty's have also hosted Easter brunch. The defunct Dig a Pony (2011–2022) hosted an annual Pastel Brunch; the event featured art, music, performances, and a pop-up menu by Burger Stevens. The defunct restaurant Quaintrelle (2016–2025) offered an Easter brunch via delivery and take-out in 2020, during the pandemic. In 2023, the defunct Shine Distillery and Grill (2019–2023) hosted an Easter brunch featuring drag performer Nicole Onoscopi.

The annual Portland Bunny Con is a bar crawl with costumed participants. Portland Rescue Mission has hosted Easter services and dinners. Union Gospel Mission hosts an Easter brunch annually and distributes Easter food baskets.

=== Religious ===
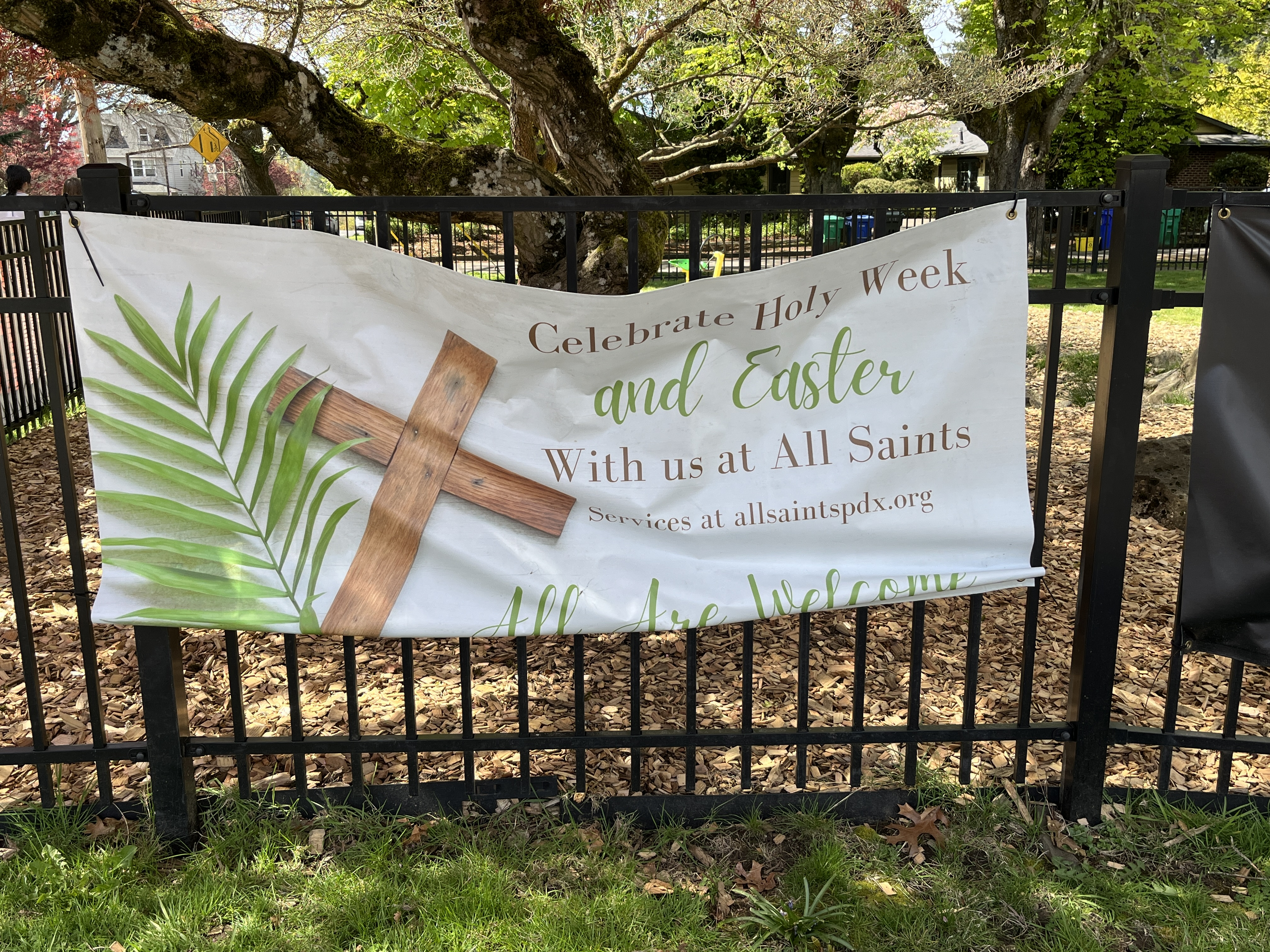
Sign promoting Easter service, All Saints Episcopal Church, Woodstock, 2026

Easter Sunday services are available at The Grotto. Many churches have hosted Easter celebrations, including Bethel African Methodist Episcopal, Our Lady of Lavang Church in northeast Portland, and the St. John the Baptist Ukrainian Orthodox Church.

In 2025, The Oregonian said: "Since 2020, Highland Christian Center has seen consistent growth within its congregation, with Easter attendance steadily climbing each year. After a pre-pandemic high of more than 800 attendees in 2019, numbers dropped significantly due to COVID-19, with around 200 people attending in 2021."

== See also ==
- Culture of Portland, Oregon
- Religion in Portland, Oregon
