= Mizpah Presbyterian Church of East Portland =

Historic church in Portland, Oregon, U.S.

- U.S. National Register of Historic Places
- Portland Historic Landmark
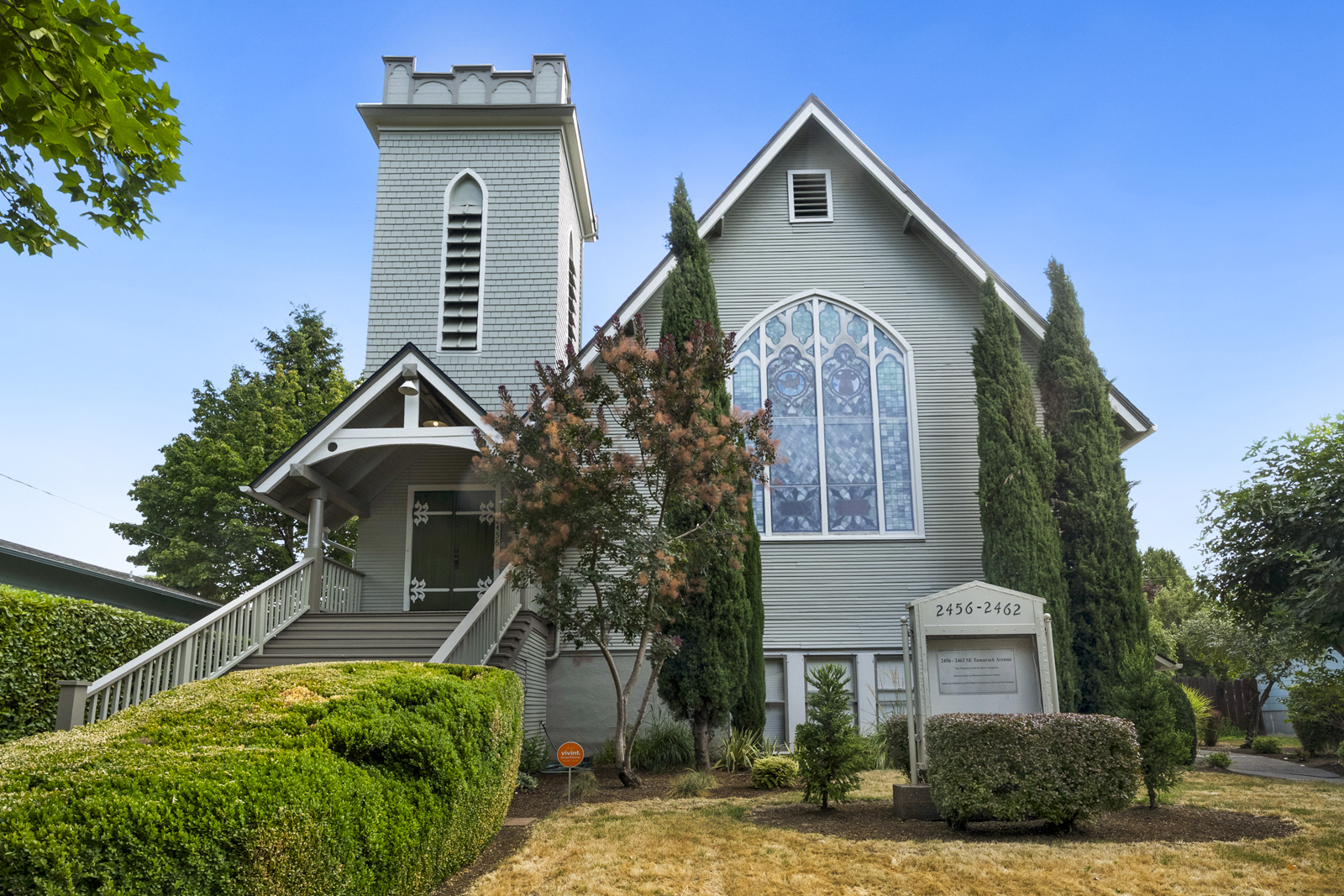
- The building’s exterior in 2024

- Location within Portland, Oregon
- Location: 2456-2462 SE Tamarack Ave. Portland, Oregon
- Coordinates: 45°30′19″N 122°38′48″W
- Area: less than one acre
- Built: 1902
- Architect: Lawrence B. Valk
- Architectural style: Carpenter Gothic
- NRHP reference No.: 83002174
- Added to NRHP: May 19, 1983

The former Mizpah Presbyterian Church is a building in southeast Portland, Oregon.

This Carpenter Gothic style church is on the National Register of Historic Places and is the oldest structure in Ladd’s Addition.

== History ==
Mizpah Presbyterian Church was built in 1902, and moved to its current location in Ladd’s Addition in 1911. An addition at the east end was added to the main structure in 1924, and was used for classrooms and meeting rooms.

The church's wood-frame structure features a design from the mid-1800's. Above the prominent entryway staircase rises a Basilican bell tower adjacent to the main structure. In the bell tower is the original bell cast in 1888 by Vanduzen and Tift at the Buckeye Bell Foundry in Cincinnati, Ohio.

It served the Presbyterian community as a church and community center until 1961. From 1961 to 1978, the structure was rented to several other congregations and organizations, each of which had a short life.

After 17 years of neglect, it was purchased by Artur Lind in 1978 who converted it over the next three years for use as four residential units. Lind completed the design work himself, used the 20-foot pews to make railings, staircases, furniture, and accent pieces, and obtained the National Register of Historic Places designation in 1983.

In 1996, Ross Regis purchased the property for $520,000 and made many improvements to the interior and exterior of the building while maintaining architectural integrity and Artur Lind’s legacy.

During 2016-17, the front and rear basement apartments were renovated, and the seismic retrofit was completed. In 2018, the upper rear apartment was renovated, and in 2019 the former sanctuary was renovated. In 2020, the front porch columns and floor were replaced. During 2021-22, the stained-glass windows were rebuilt. The building exterior was painted in 2023.

After 28 years of ownership, and completion of a 10 year renovation plan, Regis sold the property for $1.4 million to Holy Owned LLC on December 23, 2024.

== See also ==
- Culture of Portland, Oregon
- National Register of Historic Places listings in Southeast Portland, Oregon
- Religion in Portland, Oregon
