= Religion in Portland, Oregon =

Religious affiliation in Portland metro (2024)
Unaffiliated	42%
Protestant Christian	25%
Catholic	11%
Latter-day Saint/Mormon	4%
Other Christian	2%
Unitarians and New Age faiths	6%
Jewish	2%
Buddhist	2%
Hindu	2%
Muslim	1%
Other faiths	1%

Historically, Portland, Oregon has been a religious city. In modern times, however, it has become the least religious city in the United States. According to the 2024 Pew Research Center Religious Landscape Study, 44% of people in the Portland area in 2024 identified as "unaffiliated," tied with Seattle, and 2% higher than San Francisco. Specifically, 21% identify as "nothing in particular," 12% as atheists, and 9% as agnostic.

According to the same study, 42% of the Portland area identifies as Christian, with 25% identifying as some kind of Protestant, 11% identifying as Catholic, and 4% identifying as Latter-day Saint (Mormon). About 2% fall into other Christian categories. About 5% identify as "Unitarians, other liberal faiths, and new age religions." 8% fall into other religious categories, including Islam, Judaism, Buddhism, and Hinduism.

== History ==
Like most American cities, for most of its history, Portland was overwhelmingly Christian. The first Protestant church in Oregon was built in Oregon City starting in 1842. Completed in 1844, this Methodist church was also the first Protestant church on the continental West Coast of what became the United States. The oldest existing church is St. John's Episcopal Church, now known as Oaks Pioneer Church. Fashioned from a partly completed house owned by pioneer Lot Whitcomb, it was the first Episcopal church in Oregon. The church was built in Milwaukie and the building was moved to its current location in Sellwood in 1961 after it had been practically abandoned in favor of a newer building which still exists today on the corner of SE Jefferson and 21st in Milwaukie. In an 1890 analysis of Portland, E. Kimbark MacColl wrote "Portland was well endowed with churches, with approximately one for every 600 residents." On July 26, 1897, the Northwestern States Mission (headquartered in Portland) was organized by the Church of Jesus Christ of Latter-day Saints (LDS Church) to search out Latter-day Saints who had moved to Oregon. In 1887, businessmen that were members of the LDS Church established a lumber mill near Baker, Oregon. This act, combined with the prophecies of church apostle Franklin D. Richards that there would be stakes in Oregon, led to the further migration of Latter-day Saints into the state.

== Catholicism ==
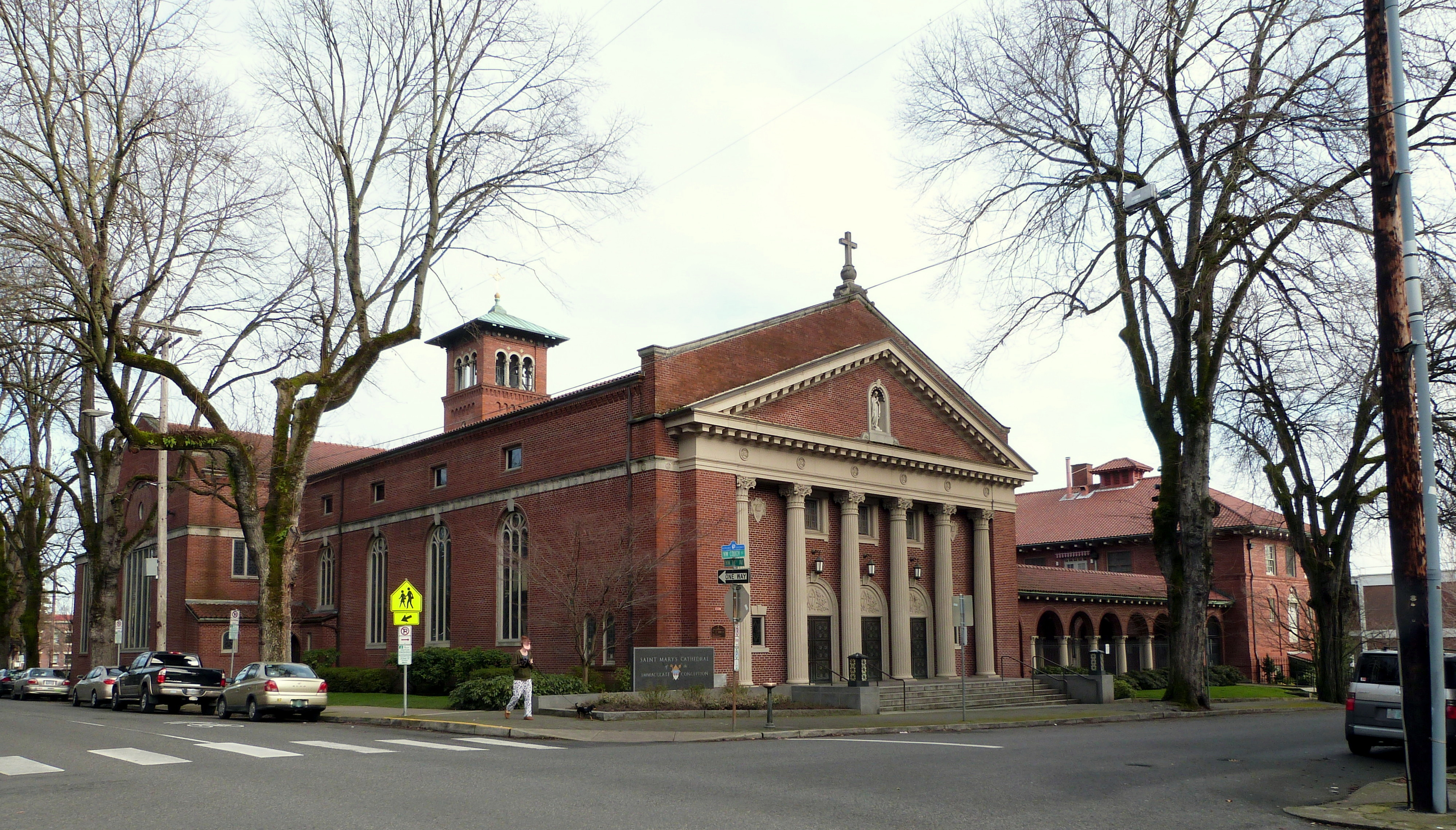
St. Mary's Cathedral of the Immaculate Conception is the seat of the Roman Catholic Archdiocese of Portland.

The city's archdiocese is the Roman Catholic Archdiocese of Portland in Oregon. The current archbishop of Portland is Alexander King Sample. St. Mary's Cathedral of the Immaculate Conception is the cathedral for the archdiocese. There are multiple religious orders in the area, including the Sisters of St. Mary of Oregon, the Servite Order, and the Franciscan Sisters of the Eucharist. The Grotto is a monastery on Rocky Butte that is known for their elaborate Christmas light displays.

The archdiocese operates ten High Schools, six of which are located in the Portland area. Central Catholic High School, De La Salle North Catholic High School, Jesuit High School, La Salle High School, St. Mary's Academy, and Valley Catholic School. The Franciscan Sisters of the Eucharist also operate the Franciscan Montessori Earth School & Saint Francis Academy which serves Pre-K through 8th grade.

From 1843 to 1846, the Oregon Country was an apostolic vicariate, led by Francis Norbert Blanchet. In 1928, the Roman Catholic Archdiocese of Portland in Oregon was founded with Edward D. Howard as the first archbishop.

== Protestantism ==
=== Baptists ===
In addition to some Southern Baptist Churches, Portland has many Independent Baptist Churches. First Baptist Church in Downtown Portland is the largest Baptist church in the area.

=== Episcopalianism ===
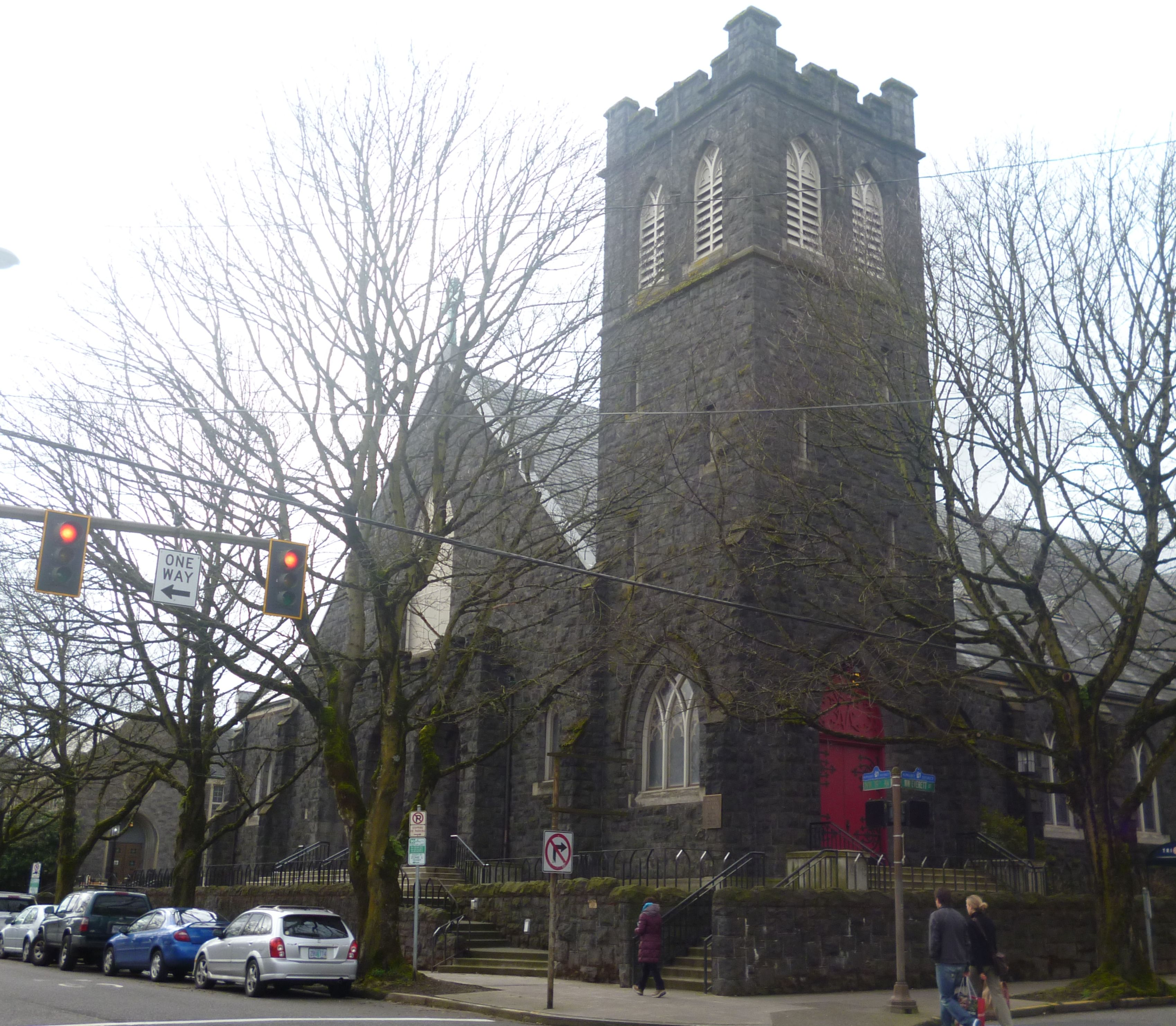
Trinity Episcopal Cathedral has been home to many influential Portlanders throughout history and is the church attended by Portland Mayor Ted Wheeler.

The Episcopal Diocese of Oregon of the Episcopal Church serves Portland. Trinity Episcopal Cathedral is the diocese's cathedral. The current bishop is Diana Akiyama.

On May 18, 1851, two reverends along with four parishioners organized Trinity Episcopal Church in Portland. It was the first Episcopal congregation organized in the Oregon Territory. The two reverends went on to organize parishes in four other Oregon cities by the end of the year.

In 1853 the congregation had grown to 25 parishioners, and called its first rector, John D. McCarty. A new building, located at the corner of Southwest Second Avenue and Oak Street in Portland on land donated by parishioner Benjamin Stark, was consecrated by the newly elected Missionary Bishop of the Missionary District of the Oregon and Washington Territories, Thomas Fielding Scott, it was the first Episcopal church building north of San Francisco and west of St. Paul.

By 1871, Trinity had grown to over 200 members. The congregation had purchased a half block at the corner of Southwest Sixth Avenue and Oak Street for $3,000. In 1872 a new church building was built on this site that was thought to more accurately reflect the congregation's (and the City of Portland's) stature. The congregation in this period included many prominent Portlanders, including Cicero Hunt Lewis, Sylvester Pennoyer, Rodney Glisan, and Matthew Deady. In 1873, Trinity was involved in the founding of Good Samaritan Hospital. In 1902, the church building at Sixth and Oak was heavily damaged by fire, and the congregation decided to relocate yet again, to the more fashionable NW 19th Avenue, where many wealthy parishioners lived. This new building, in which the congregation still worships, was consecrated on October 14, 1906. The stained glass windows, the work of the Charles J. Connick Studios of Boston, date from the late 1940s.

=== Lutheranism ===
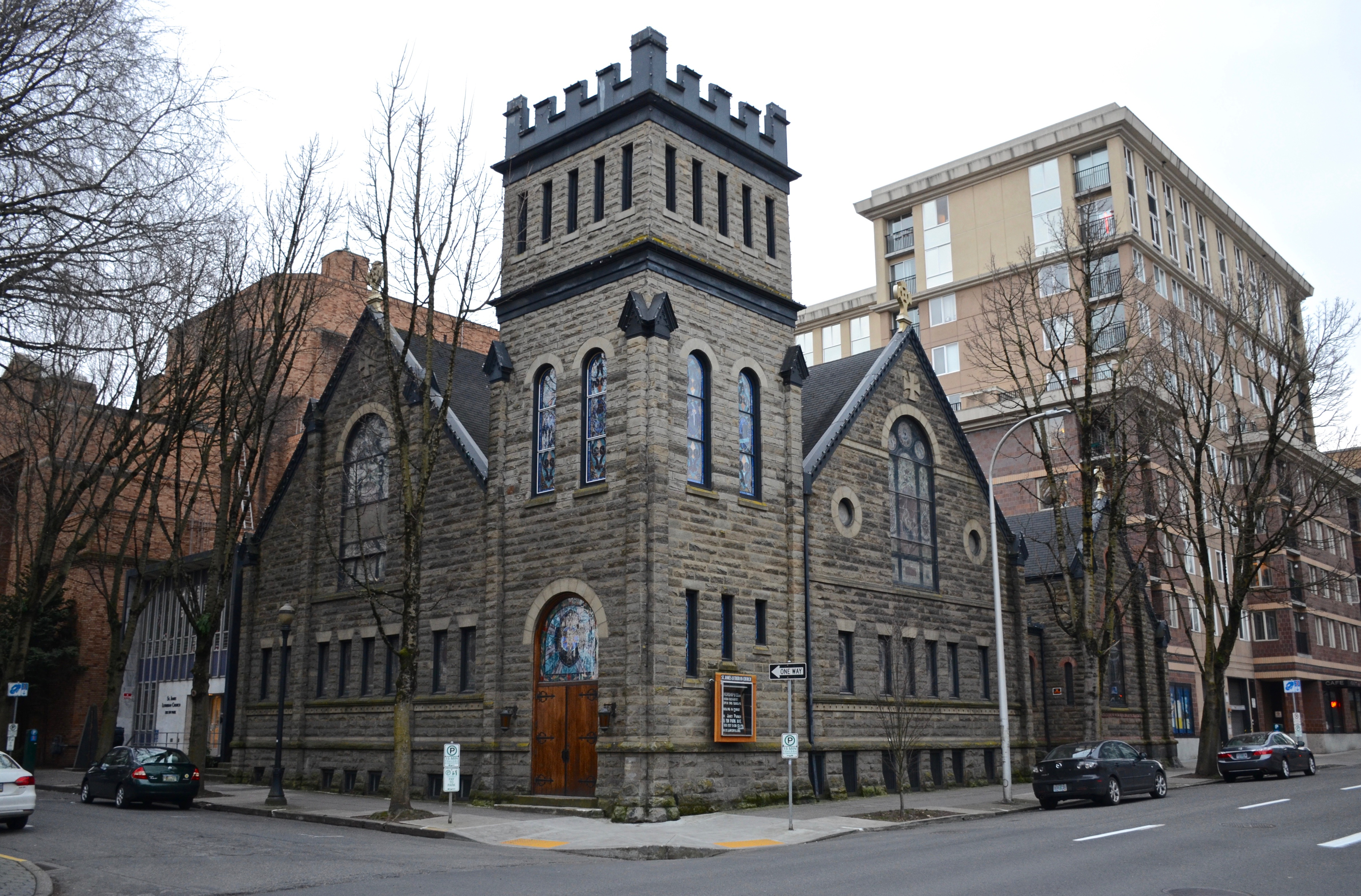
St. James Lutheran Church

Portland is part of the Oregon Synod of the Evangelical Lutheran Church in America and the Northwest District of the Lutheran Church–Missouri Synod. The Lutheran Church operated Concordia University in Northeast Portland until 2020.

In 1889, missionaries established St. James Lutheran Church as Portland's first English-speaking Lutheran church. The first pastor was M. L. Zweizig. The church grew and thrived through the first half of the 20th century, and in 1956 added an educational annex, with space for classrooms and offices. The church was forced to remove the tower of the main building in 1951 due to structural deterioration and the tower was replaced in 1974 using historic photographs to match the original style and design as much as possible.

=== Methodism ===
Portland is located within the Oregon-Idaho Conference of the United Methodist Church.

Methodism had a very large part in Oregon's history. Most of Oregon's earliest missionaries were Methodists and these missionaries were instrumental in the founding and establishment of many of Oregon's cities.

=== Non-denominational ===
Mannahouse Church (Formerly City Bible Church) is the largest church in Portland and is one of the 100 largest churches in the United States. They operate multiple campuses and run the Mannahouse Christian Academy (Formerly City Bible Schools). They also run the Portland Bible College.

Cedar Mill Bible Church is another mega-church located near Portland's western border with Beaverton.

=== Pentecostalism ===
==== Apostolic Faith Church ====
Portland is the world headquarters of the Apostolic Faith Church. It was founded in 1906 by Florence L. Crawford, a participant in the Azusa Street Revival. William J. Seymour appointed Crawford as the state director of the Pacific Coast Apostolic Faith movement where she would help other missions and churches join the movement. Crawford's break with Seymour was complete by 1911 when she started the Apostolic Faith Church and most churches followed her.

==== Foursquare ====
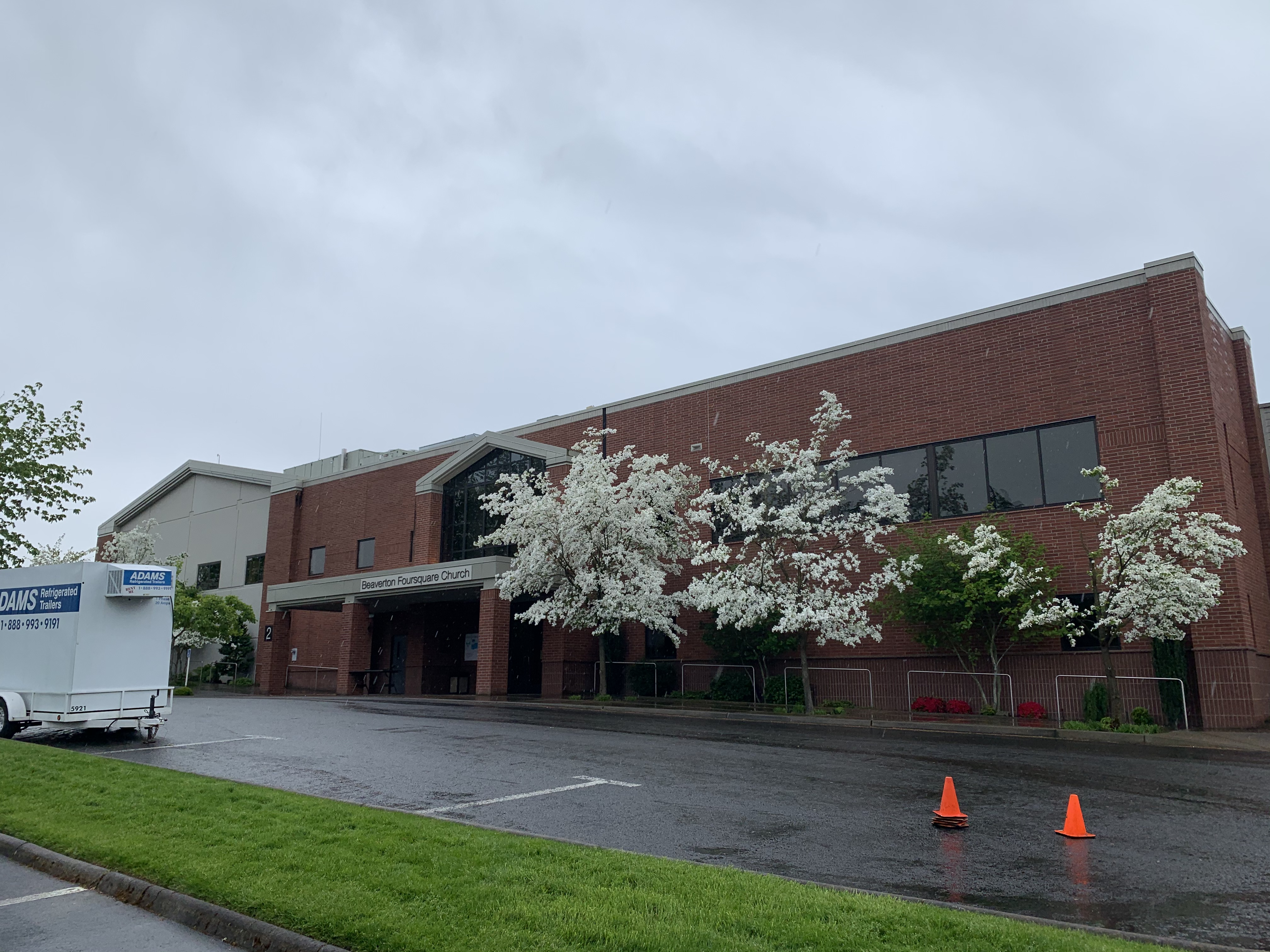
Beaverton Foursquare Church

The Portland area is home to multiple Foursquare megachurches, including the megachurch Beaverton Foursquare Church.

==== Independent Pentecostal ====
Portland also has a few Independent Pentecostal Churches.

==== Romanian Pentecostal Churches ====
The Portland area is home to a large Romanian population. Because of this there are multiple Romanian churches, though Pentecostalism is one of the most prevalent religious groups serving the Romanian community. Portland is home to seven Romanian Pentecostal churches.

=== Presbyterianism ===
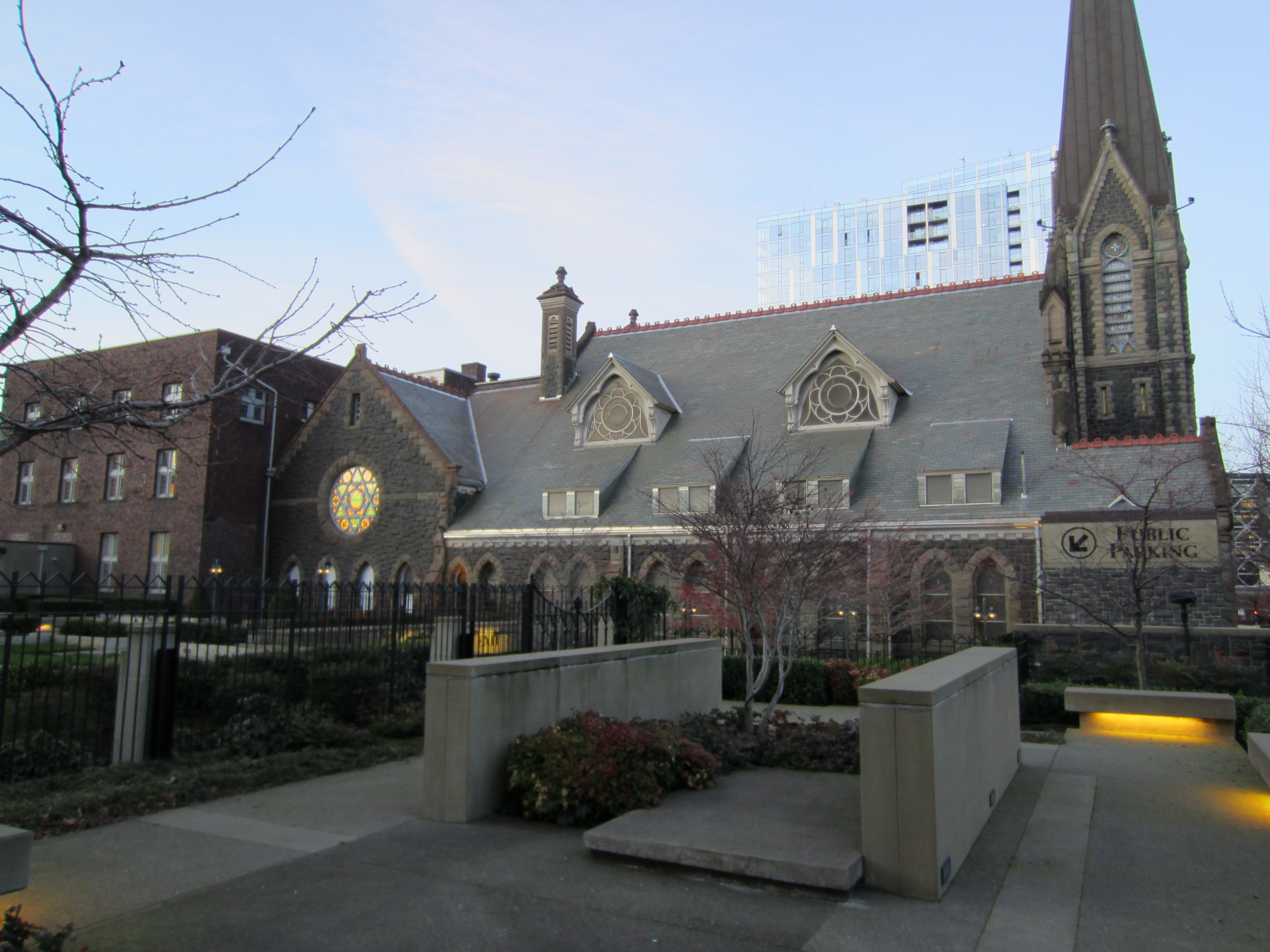
First Presbyterian Church

Portland is a part of the Synod of the Pacific of the Presbyterian Church (USA) and the Pacific Northwest Presbytery of the Presbyterian Church in America.

=== Quakers ===
Portland is home to five congregations of Quakers and George Fox University is run by the Friends General Conference.

=== Christian Science ===
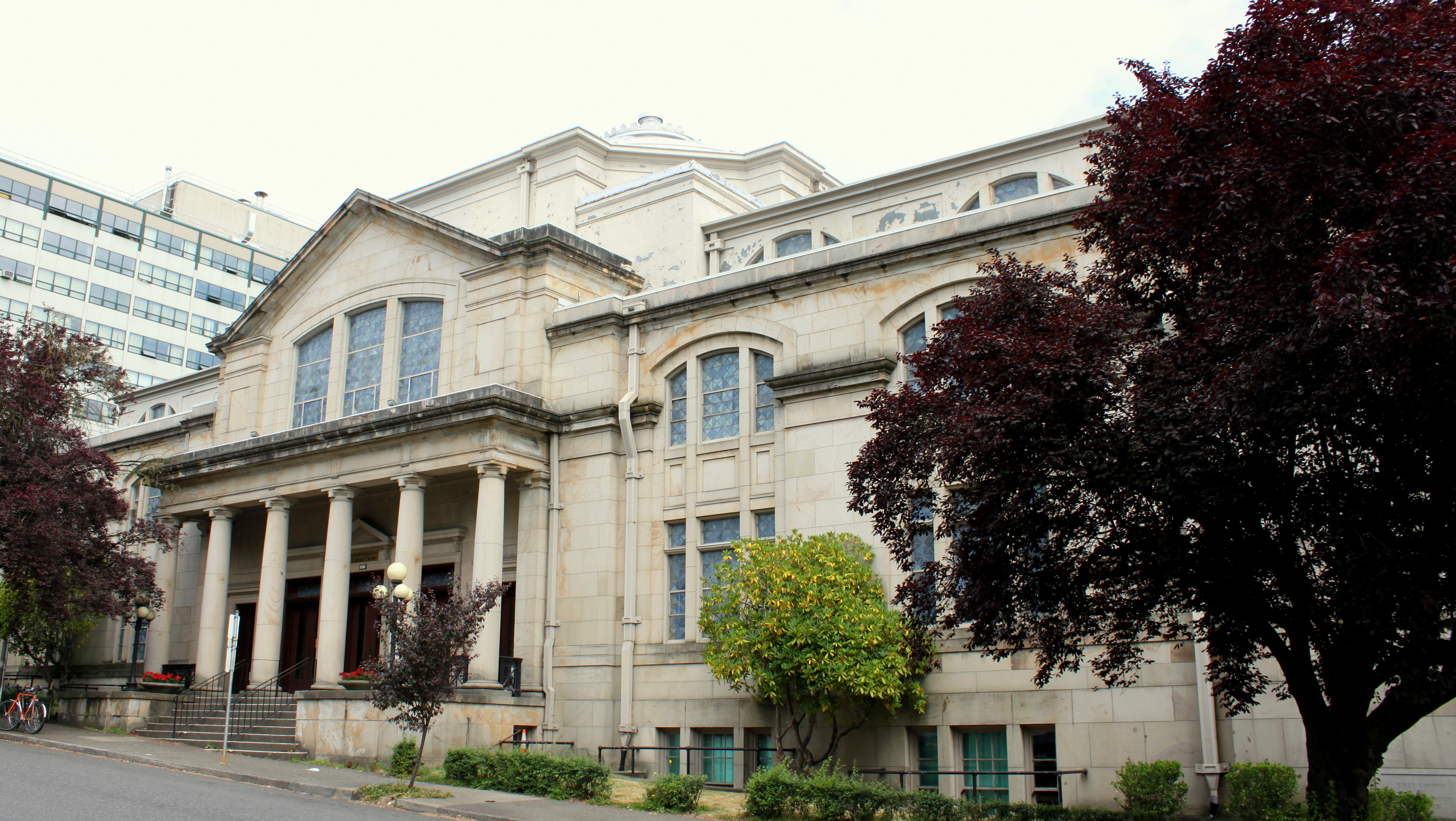
First Church of Christ, Scientist

The Portland area is home to ten Christian Science churches. Two Christian Science Reading Rooms are located in Downtown Portland, one across from Pioneer Courthouse Square and another a few blocks away adjacent to the Portland Art Museum.

The original First Church of Christ, Scientist in the Northwest District was purchased by a group of northwest neighborhoods and renamed the Northwest Neighborhood Cultural Center. It housed many nonprofits over the years including a soup kitchen, a school, and a children's theater. From the early 1990s to 2023, the building was maintained by its largest renter, the Northwest Children's Theater, until the children's theater moved to the Judy Kafoury Center for Youth Arts in Downtown. The building is currently the subject of proposals to turn it into a hotel.

== Mormonism ==
=== The Church of Jesus Christ of Latter-day Saints ===
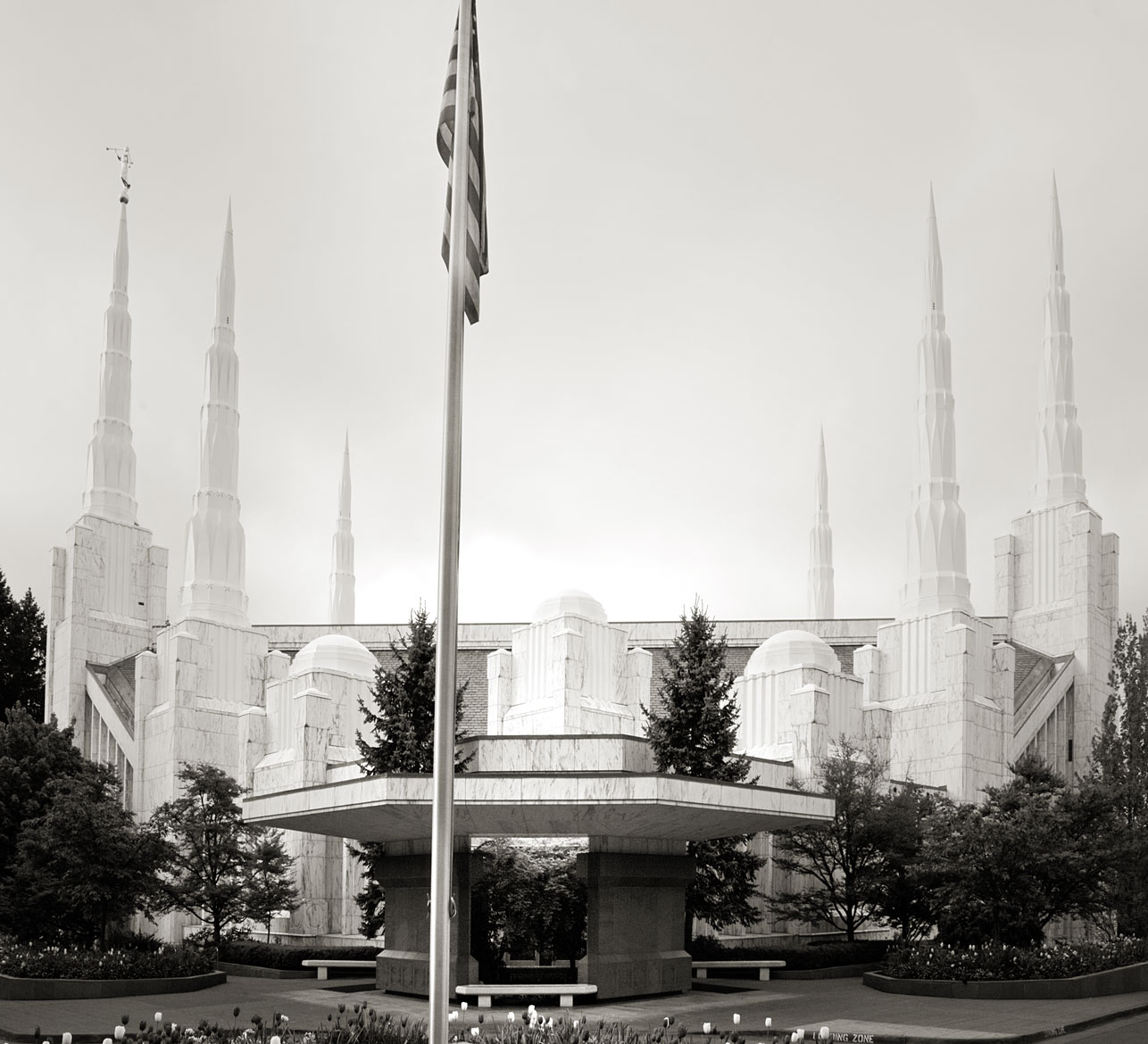
The Portland Oregon Temple of the Church of Jesus Christ of Latter-day Saints

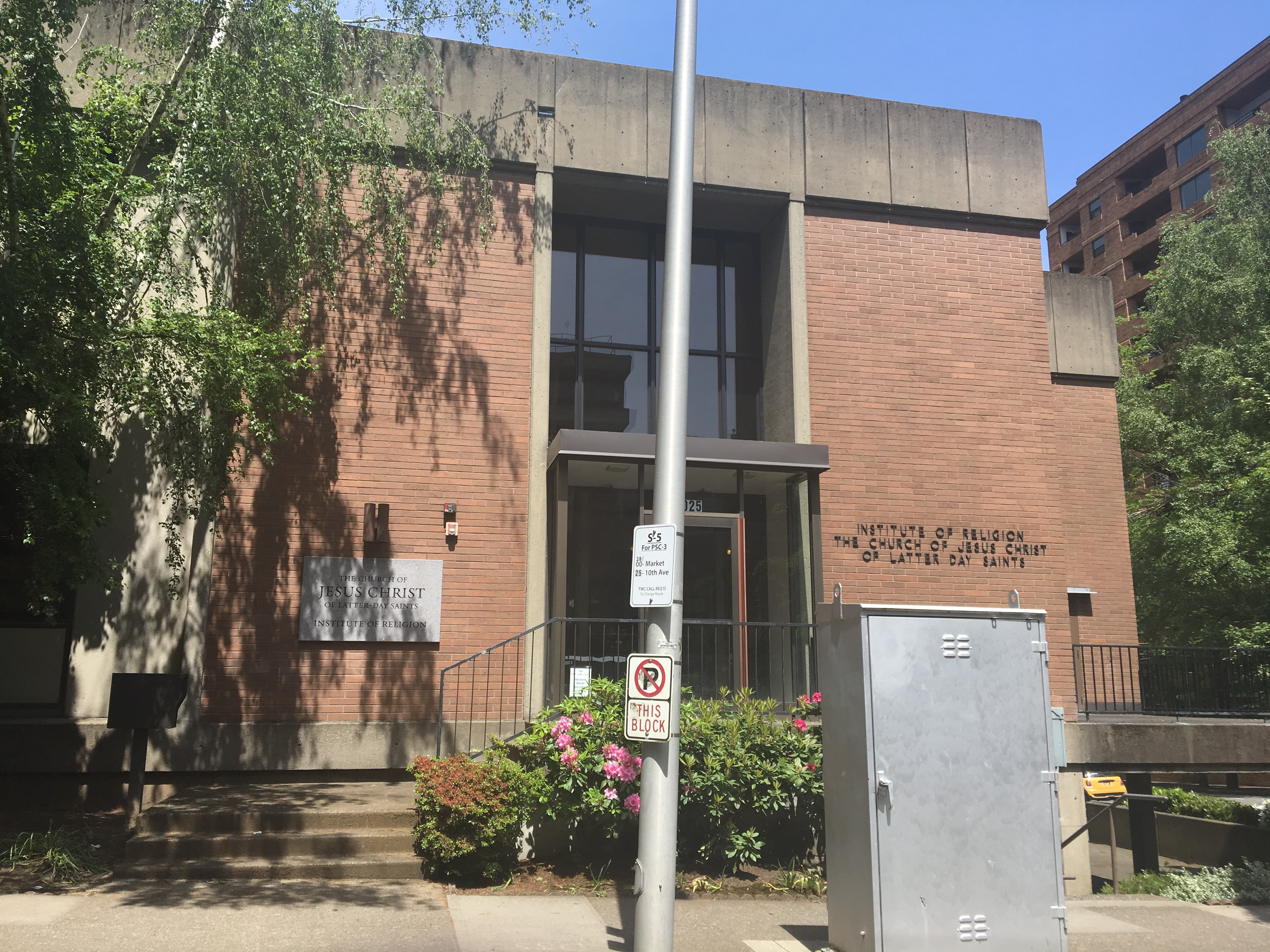
In addition to multiple high school seminaries, the Portland area is home to two college Institutes of Religion, at Mt. Hood Community College and Portland State University (pictured).

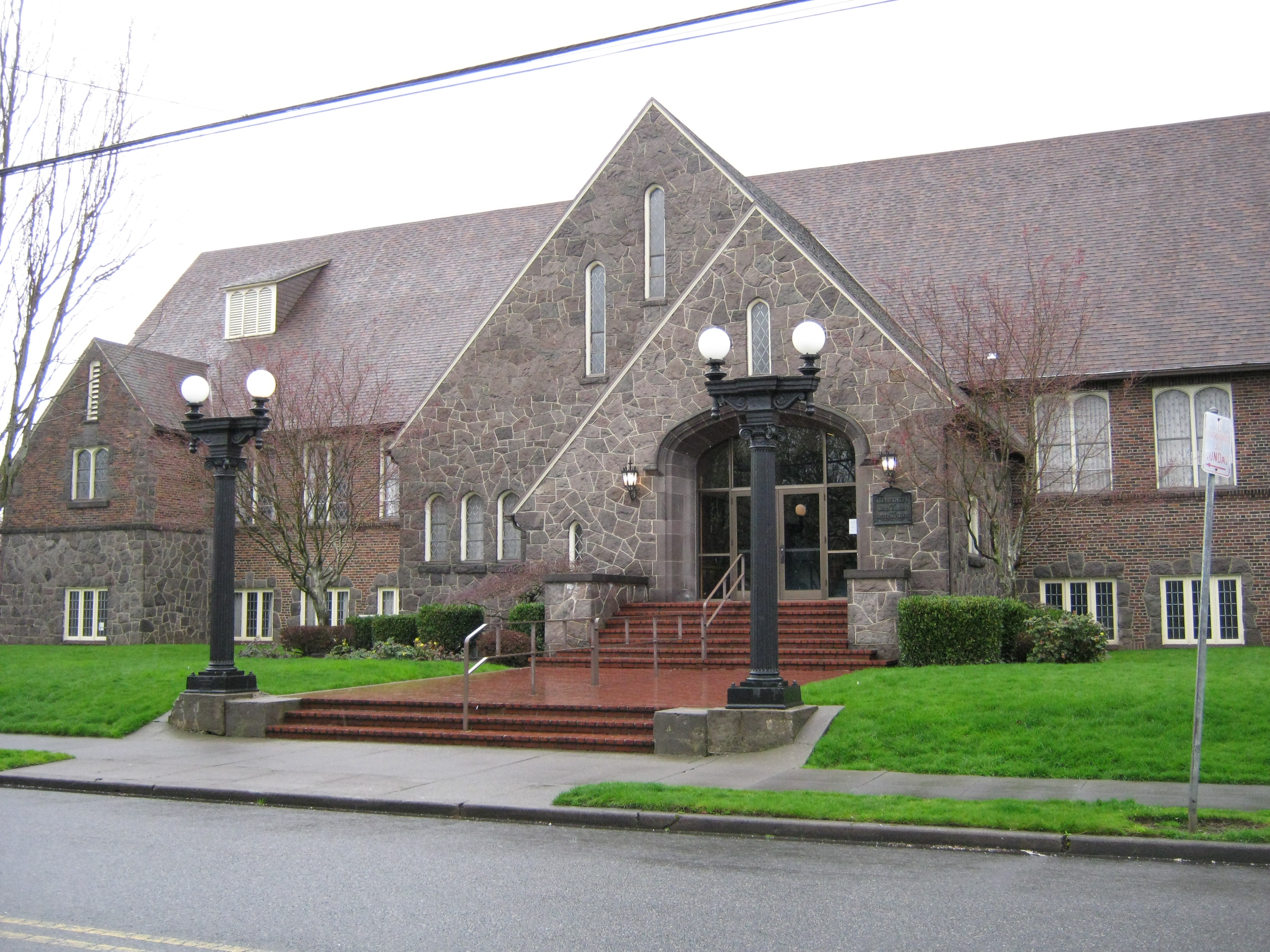
The Portland Stake Tabernacle is the oldest purpose-built LDS church in Oregon.

The Church of Jesus Christ of Latter-day Saints (LDS Church) is the second-largest religious denomination in Oregon and many influential Latter-day Saints have lived in or came from Oregon, including former U.S. Senator Gordon H. Smith, basketball player and executive Danny Ainge, and former Oregon Secretary of State Dennis Richardson.

The Oregon Country was recommended by Henry Clay to Joseph Smith as a possible location for the Mormon pioneers to settle, however they ended up going to Utah. The church's settlement in Oregon largely began with the arrival of Latter-day Saint businessmen in 1887, when they built a lumber mill in Baker City. Many members slowly immigrated to the Portland area. In 1929, the first permanent meetinghouse was built in Ladd's Addition and still stands today as a Family History Library. As of 2020, there are 10 stakes located within the Oregon Portland Mission. The church operates the Portland Oregon Temple, two Institutes of Religion, and multiple Family History Libraries.

In 2023, the church announced a second temple for the Portland metropolitan area.

=== Community of Christ ===
The Portland area has four Community of Christ churches. One in Portland, one in Tigard, and two in Clark County, Washington.

== Jehovah's Witnesses ==
The Portland area is home to around 45 congregations of Jehovah's Witnesses. Many of these congregations serve people who speak foreign languages.

== Unitarianism ==
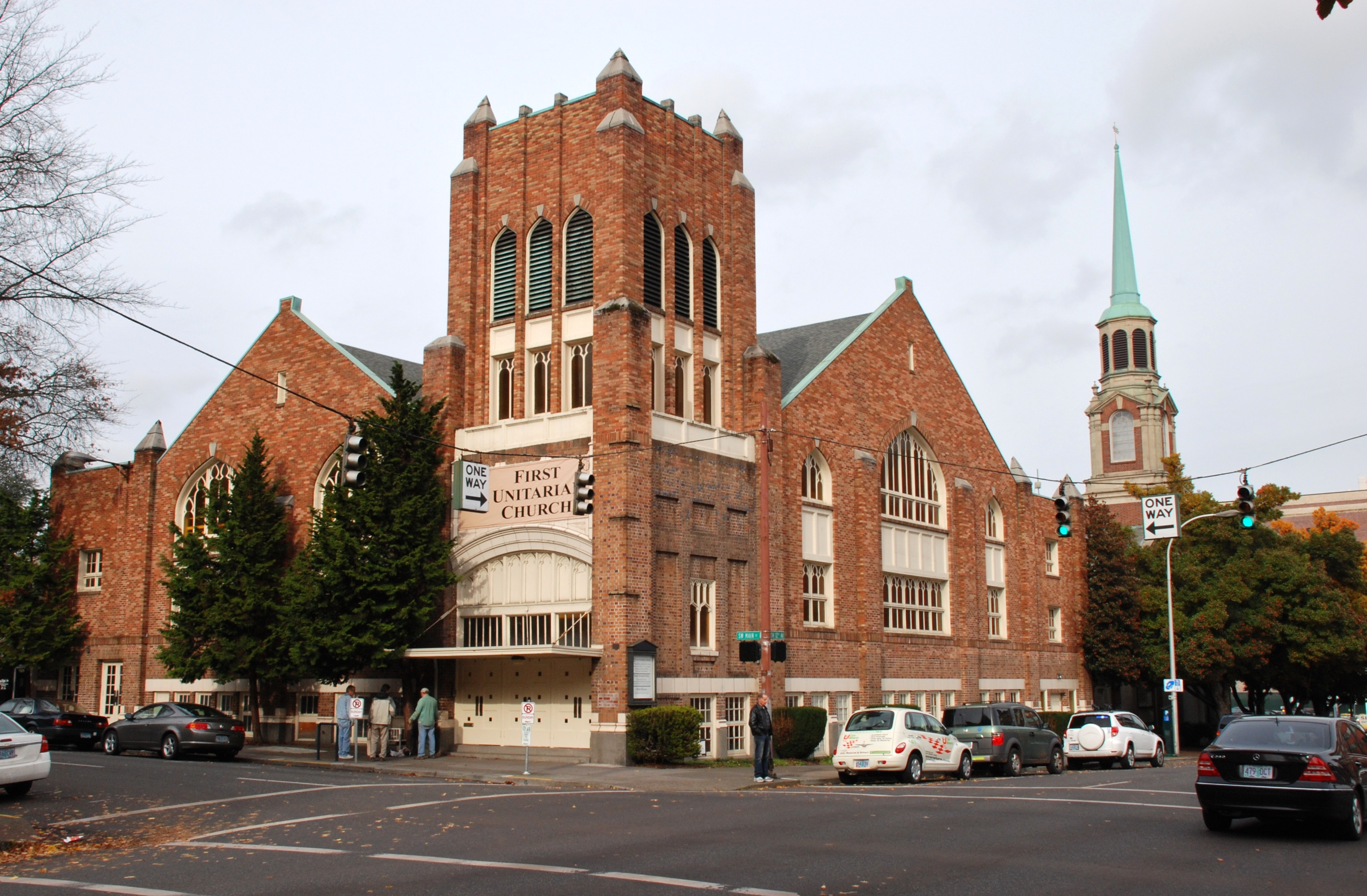
First Unitarian Church of Portland, formerly the First Church of the Nazarene

The first group identifying as Unitarians was founded in 1860, when Portland was still a small frontier town, by a group of Liberal Christians who felt that the current churches in Portland were too conservative. They met in the house of Thomas Frazar. In 1862, Thomas Starr King visited Portland from San Francisco and preached at the local Methodist church. This preaching left the group of Unitarians eager to want to start their own official church. This came to pass in 1867, when a chapel was constructed near what is now Pioneer Courthouse Square. The chapel was constructed with funds raised by the Ladies Sewing Society, created by Frazar's wife, as well as pledged money raised at the challenge of Horatio Stebbins, another visiting minister from San Francisco.

In 1979, the Unitarian church purchased a larger church located directly adjacent to the original First Church of the Nazarene of Portland, which had been built in 1921. The Nazarene church congregation was preparing for construction of a new, larger building in the Sylvan neighborhood which existed until 2020 when it was converted into a Hindu temple.

The Unitarian Universalist church still operates this building as First Unitarian Church, and also operates three additional smaller churches throughout the Portland area.

One of these smaller churches is Wy'east Unitarian Universalist Congregation, which was founded in 1996 to serve East Portland. Wy'east, named after the Indian term for Mount Hood, meets in Northeast Portland's Hollywood neighborhood.

== See also ==
- Apostolic Faith Church
- Christmas in Portland, Oregon
- Culture of Portland, Oregon
- Easter in Portland, Oregon
- Religion in Oregon
- Roman Catholic Archdiocese of Portland in Oregon
