= Sunnyside United Methodist Church =

Church in Portland, Oregon, U.S.

Coordinates: 45°30′55.88″N 122°37′39.99″W

- Sunnyside Centenary United Methodist Church
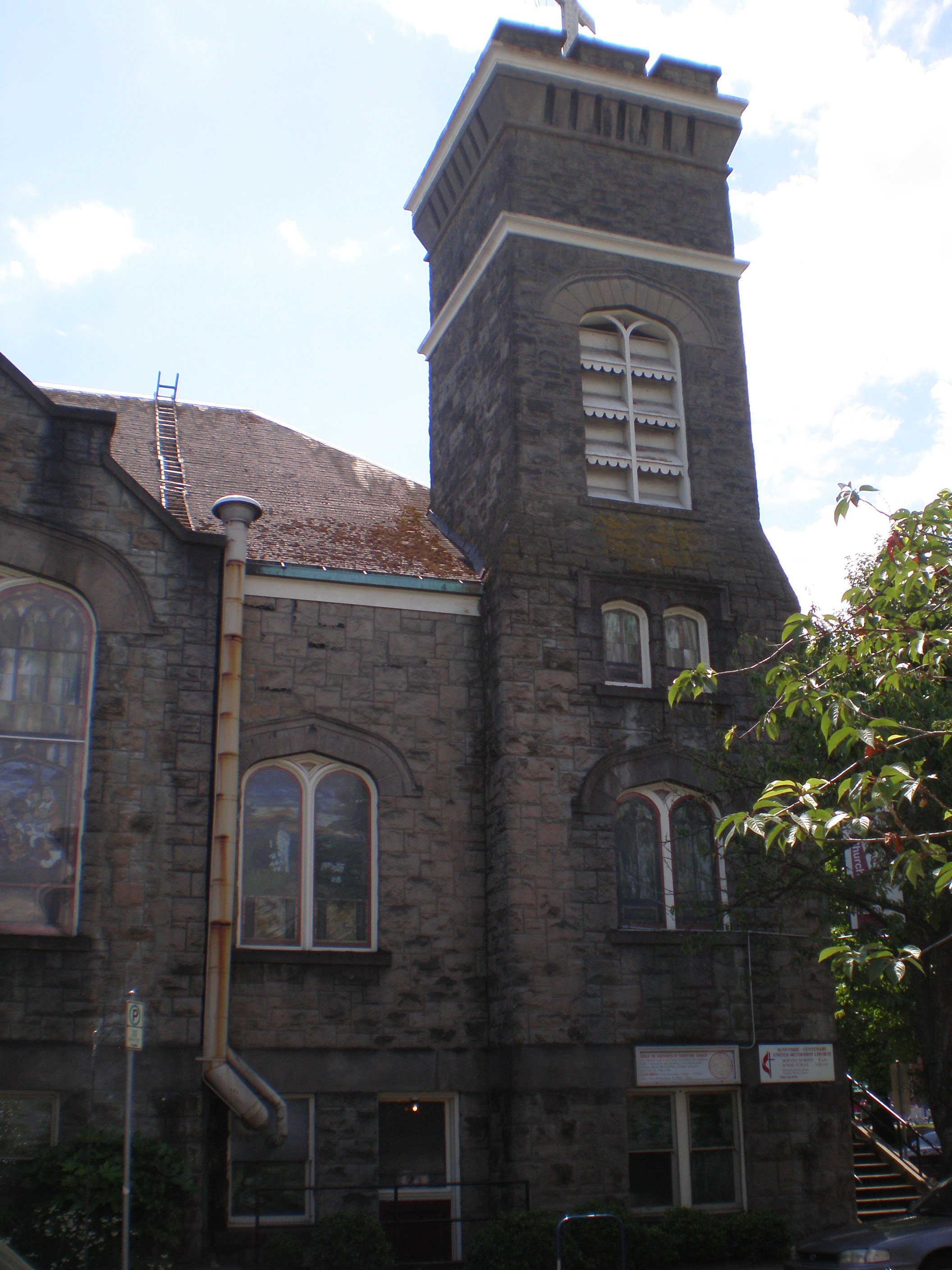
- The church's exterior, 2011
- Sunnyside United Methodist Church
- Address: 3520 SE Yamhill St; Portland, Oregon
- Country: United States
- Denomination: Methodist

History
- Status: Closed
- Founded: 1890

Architecture
- Completed: 1911
- Closed: November 2015

Sunnyside United Methodist Church, or Sunnyside Centenary United Methodist Church, is a church located at the intersection of Southeast 35th and Yamhill, in Portland, Oregon's Sunnyside neighborhood, in the United States.

== History ==
The congregation formed in 1890, at a shoe factory on Southeast 36th and Main. Members built a wooden structure in 1891, for $2,000. The present stone building was completed in 1911, and the church's 420 members made Sunnyside United Methodist one of the largest congregations in the Pacific Northwest.

The church has housed the Camp Fire summer Numanu in the City program, Children's Club, Common Cup (homeless shelter), Hard Times Suppers, PDX Toy Library, Raphael House, Alcoholics Anonymous meetings, and basketball groups, among other organizations. In September 2015, the building became property of Oregon-Idaho Annual Conference.

== See also ==
- Culture of Portland, Oregon
- List of Methodist churches in the United States
- Religion in Portland, Oregon
