= St. John's Episcopal Church (Portland, Oregon) =

Historic building in Portland, Oregon, U.S.

- U.S. National Register of Historic Places
- Portland Historic Landmark
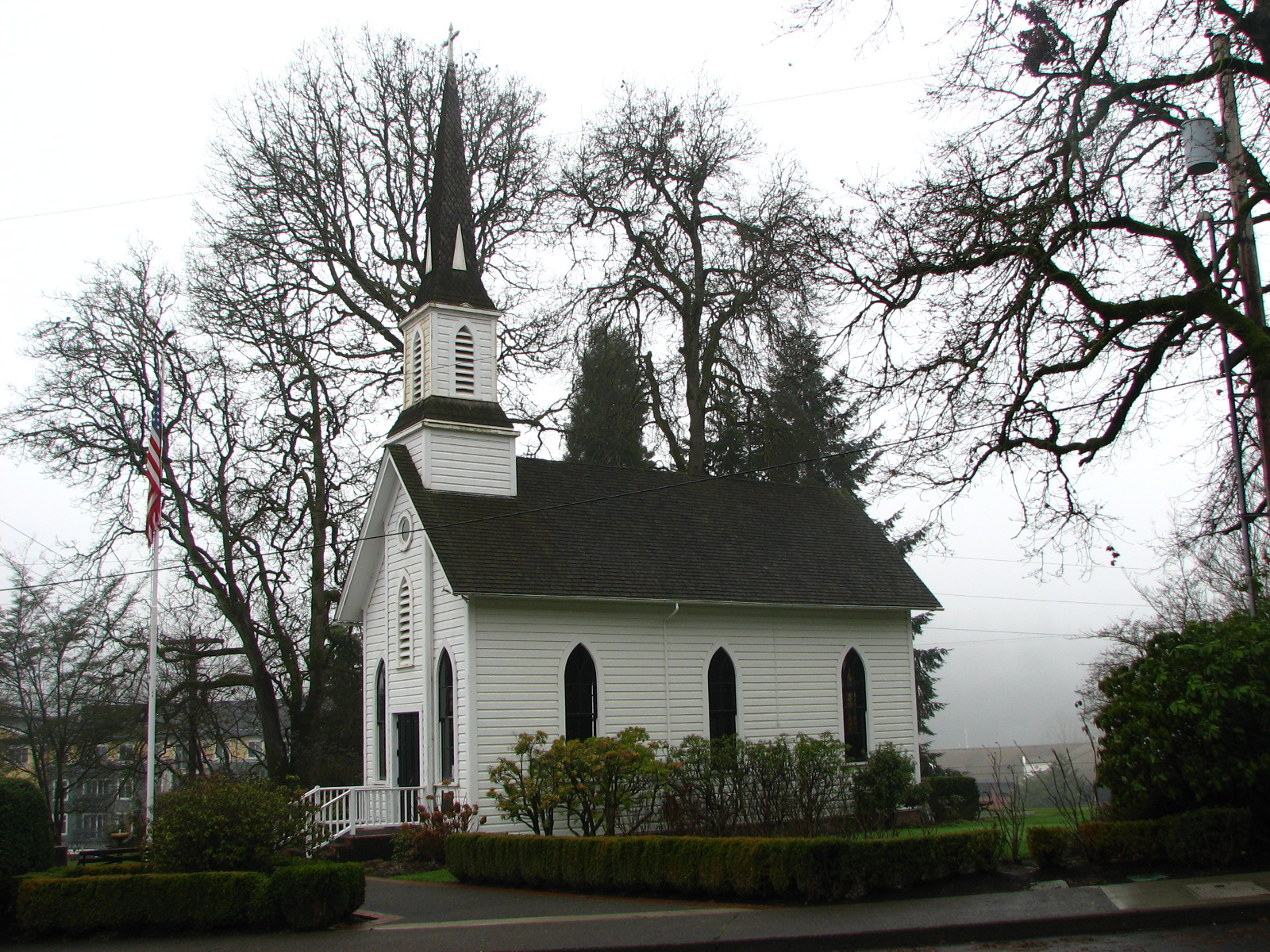
- St. John's Episcopal Church in 2009
- Location: 455 SE Spokane Street; Portland, Oregon
- Coordinates: 45°27′55″N 122°39′41″W
- Built: 1851
- Architectural style: Gothic Revival
- NRHP reference No.: 74001712
- Added to NRHP: December 27, 1974

Oaks Pioneer Church, formerly known as St. John's Episcopal Church, in southeast Portland in the U.S. state of Oregon is a non-denominational one-story chapel listed on the National Register of Historic Places. Built in 1851, it was added to the register in 1974. It is the oldest intact church building in Oregon.

Located in Oaks Pioneer Park in the Sellwood neighborhood, the rectangular post-and-beam structure has a footprint of 18 by 42 feet (5.5 by 12.8 m). Fashioned from a partly completed house owned by pioneer Lot Whitcomb, it was the first Episcopal church in Oregon.

Whitcomb was a steamboat operator who founded the community of Milwaukie. The church, originally sited on the outskirts of Milwaukie, was moved nearer the town's center in 1862. Modifications over the years included revisions to the chancel in 1869 and the windows, siding, and belfry in 1888. The belfry contains a ship's bell that belonged to Whitcomb.

Supplanted by a new church building in 1948 (St. John the Evangelist Episcopal Church in Milwaukie, Oregon) and scheduled for demolition in 1969, the church was saved by private interests that paid to float it down the Willamette River on a barge and install it in Oaks Pioneer Park. In the 21st century, the church functions as a museum and wedding site.

== See also ==
- Culture of Portland, Oregon
- National Register of Historic Places listings in Southeast Portland, Oregon
- Religion in Portland, Oregon
