= Mannahouse Christian Academy =

Mannahouse Christian Academy Portland
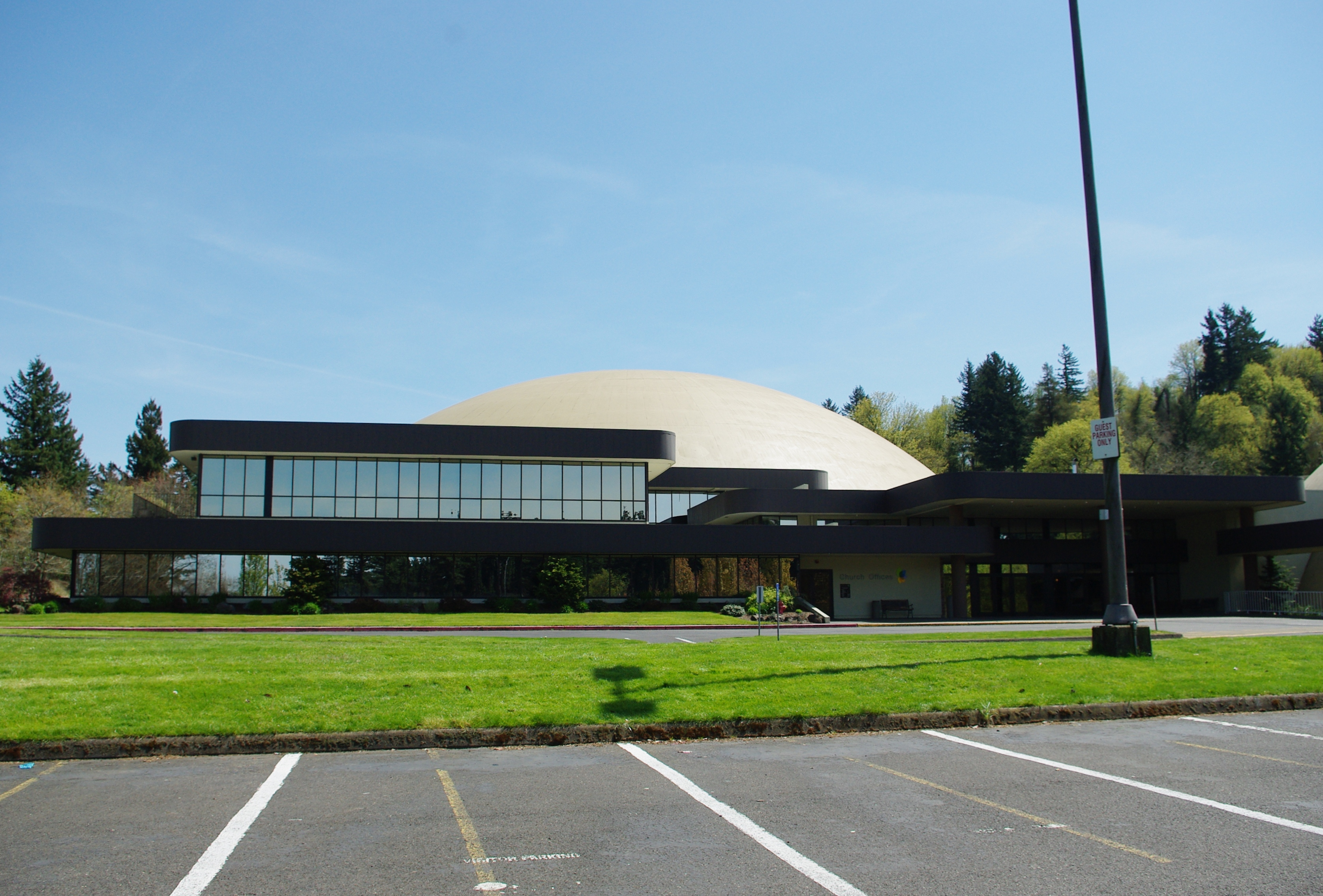

Location
- 9200 NE Fremont Street; Portland, Multnomah County, Oregon 97220; United States; 45°32′59.57″N 122°33′56.46″W

Information
- Type: Private Christian
- Founded: 1974
- Superintendent: Lynden Evans
- Grades: PreK-12
- Enrollment: 600+
- Colors: Blue and gold
- Athletics conference: OSAA The Valley 10 League 1A-1
- Mascot: Lions
- Rival: Portland Christian Junior/Senior High School
- Accreditation: OSAA ACSI NWAC
- Affiliation: Nondenominational Christianity, Ministers Fellowship International (For PBC Purposes)
- Website: mannahouseacademy.com

Mannahouse Christian Academy (formerly City Christian Schools) is a private preK-12th grade Christian school located in Portland, Oregon, Eugene, Oregon, and Vancouver, Washington. It is associated with Mannahouse. The campus is within Mannahouse Church, formerly City Bible Church. This church annually hosts One Conference, an event which students are encouraged to attend. The school is accredited with AdvancED. Mannahouse Christian Academy is also partnered with George Fox University for an opportunity to earn college credits for their junior and senior high school students.

== History ==
=== Portland ===
Mannahouse Christian's Academy Portland, Oregon Rocky Butte campus was founded in 1974 as Temple Christian Schools, a vision of Bible Temple Church (later Mannahouse), enrolling 101 students grades 1-9. This campus serves as the main campus for Mannahouse Christian Academy, offering multiple connected buildings and an outside chapel for all students. The main reason for establishing this school was the need for students to receive quality academics in a Godly environment. MCA has now grown to over 600 students, with PreK-12 in the Portland campus alone.

=== Vancouver ===
Mannahouse Christian Academy's Vancouver, Washington preschool campus was started in 2010 at their Mill Plain campus, although Rocky Butte's preschool started before this. In 2016, Mannahouse Christian Academy announced that they would be opening kindergarten at the same campus. In 2019, the same year that the school was renamed from City Christian Schools to Mannahouse Christian Academy, the Vancouver campus at 112th Ave opened hosting K-8th education. For students graduating 8th grade, transportation is available to the Portland campus.

=== Eugene ===
Mannahouse Christian Academy's Eugene, Oregon location opened in 2022 hosts a 25-acre facility for PreK and 9-12 Highschool students. It is currently the only Protestant high school in all of Eugene, Oregon. Mannahouse Christian Academy has also partnered with Christian Middle Schools in Eugene in combined chapel sessions to help student's spiritual growth.

=== Other ===
Mannahouse Christian Academy formerly had a preschool campus in Tigard, Oregon however it has since closed down. Mannahouse Christian Academy also hosts a variety of international students from Italy, Vietnam, Japan, China, Spain, Brazil, and Korea. This, along with many Hispanics and Burmese students make Mannahouse Christian Academy one of the most diverse private Highschools in Oregon.

== Academics ==
Mannahouse Christian Academy is accredited with Cognia and is partnered with OSAA, ZMan, Children's Scholarship Fund, and the National Honor Society among others.

=== Elementary ===
Along with the standard Elementary classroom subjects such as Math and Language Arts, Mannahouse Christian Academy's Elementary features Technology, Fine Arts, Music, Athletics Field Trips, and After-Care for all elementary students. Students typically have one teacher with other elective teachers throughout the week. Mannahouse's small class sizes allow students to develop close friendships with one another as early as Preschool.

=== Middle School ===
Along with standard Middle School classrooms, MCA's Middle School features Technology, Science Labs, Choir, Performing Arts and Music, Electives, and Field Trips. They compete with other Middle Schools in Athletics such as Track, Field, Basketball, Volleyball and a Physical Education class.

=== High School ===
Mannahouse Christian Academy's High School offers a wide variety of academics. They offer Technology, Science Labs, Performing Arts and Music, Honors Classes, Blended Learning, Online AP Classes, and dual credit opportunities at George Fox University and Portland Bible College. Their Athletics offer Soccer, Basketball, Track, Field, Volleyball (Male & Female) and Cheerleading. A high school student in order to graduate requires 4 English credits, 3 Math credits, 3 Social Studies credits, 3 Science credits, 3 Applied Arts credits, 2 Religion credits, 1 Health credit, and 1 Physical Education credit, amounting to twenty credits total.

== Athletics ==
Mannahouse Christian Academy has a wide variety of athletic options for their students, being accredited by OSAA. They compete currently at the 1A level against both private and public schools for their Portland Campus and compete in the 1A level for their Eugene campus.

=== Boys Basketball ===
Mannahouse Christian Academy has a varsity and junior varsity team for Boys Basketball in both Portland and Eugene campuses. For their Portland team, as of 2024 they are ranked #7 in OSAA 2A. For their Eugene team, as of 2024, they are ranked #75 in OSAA 1A.

=== Girls Basketball ===
Mannahouse Christian Academy has a varsity and junior varsity team for Girls Basketball for their Portland campus. As of 2024, they are ranked #29 for OSAA 2A.

=== Volleyball ===
Mannahouse Christian Academy has a varsity and junior varsity team for Girls Volleyball for their Portland campus, and a varsity team for their Eugene campus. They are also trying to start up a Boys Volleyball team in the Portland Campus. For their Portland team, they are ranked #26 in OSAA 2A. For their Eugene team, they are ranked #75 for OSAA 1A.

=== Cheerleading ===
Mannahouse Christian Academy has a cheer-leading team in both their Portland and Eugene campus. Currently both teams do not compete against other Cheer leading teams however that is hoped to change in the 2025 school year.

=== Track & Field ===
Mannahouse Christian Academy has a varsity boys and girls Track & Field team for both their Portland and Eugene campuses. As of writing this, they have not competed yet in any track meets and therefore have no current ranking.
