= First Church of Christ, Scientist (Portland, Oregon) =

Historic building in Portland, Oregon, U.S.

- U.S. National Register of Historic Places
- U.S. Historic district – Contributing property
- Portland Historic Landmark
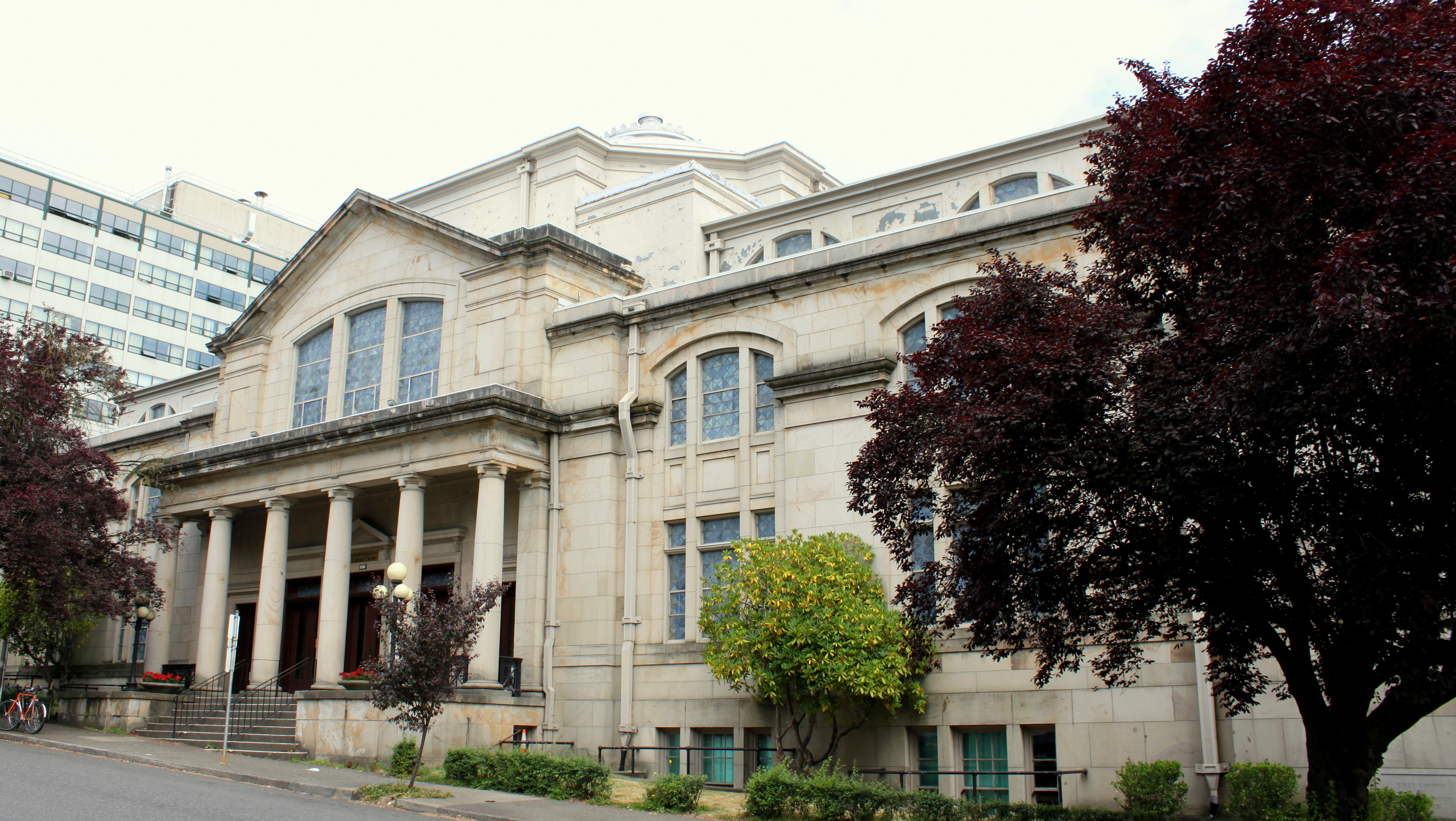

- Location within Portland, Oregon Location within Oregon Location within the United States
- Location: 1819 NW Everett Street; Portland, Oregon
- Coordinates: 45°31′31″N 122°41′23″W
- Built: 1909
- Architect: Solon Spencer Beman
- Architectural style: Beaux-Arts
- Part of: Alphabet Historic District (ID00001293)
- NRHP reference No.: 78002314
- Added to NRHP: October 2, 1978

The former First Church of Christ, Scientist, built in 1909, is an historic building located at 1813 NW Everett Street, in Portland, Oregon. It was designed by noted Chicago architect Solon Spencer Beman, who designed many Christian Science churches. On October 2, 1978, the building was added to the National Register of Historic Places.

The building was purchased by the Northwest Children's Theater and converted into a theater called the Northwest Neighborhood Cultural Center (NWNCC). This closed in 2023 after the Children's Theater moved to Downtown Portland.

The building is currently the subject of proposals to turn it into a "lifestyle hotel".

== See also ==
- Culture of Portland, Oregon
- National Register of Historic Places listings in Northwest Portland, Oregon
- List of former Christian Science churches, societies and buildings
- First Church of Christ, Scientist (disambiguation)
- Religion in Portland, Oregon
