= Cafe Olli =

Restaurant in Portland, Oregon, U.S.

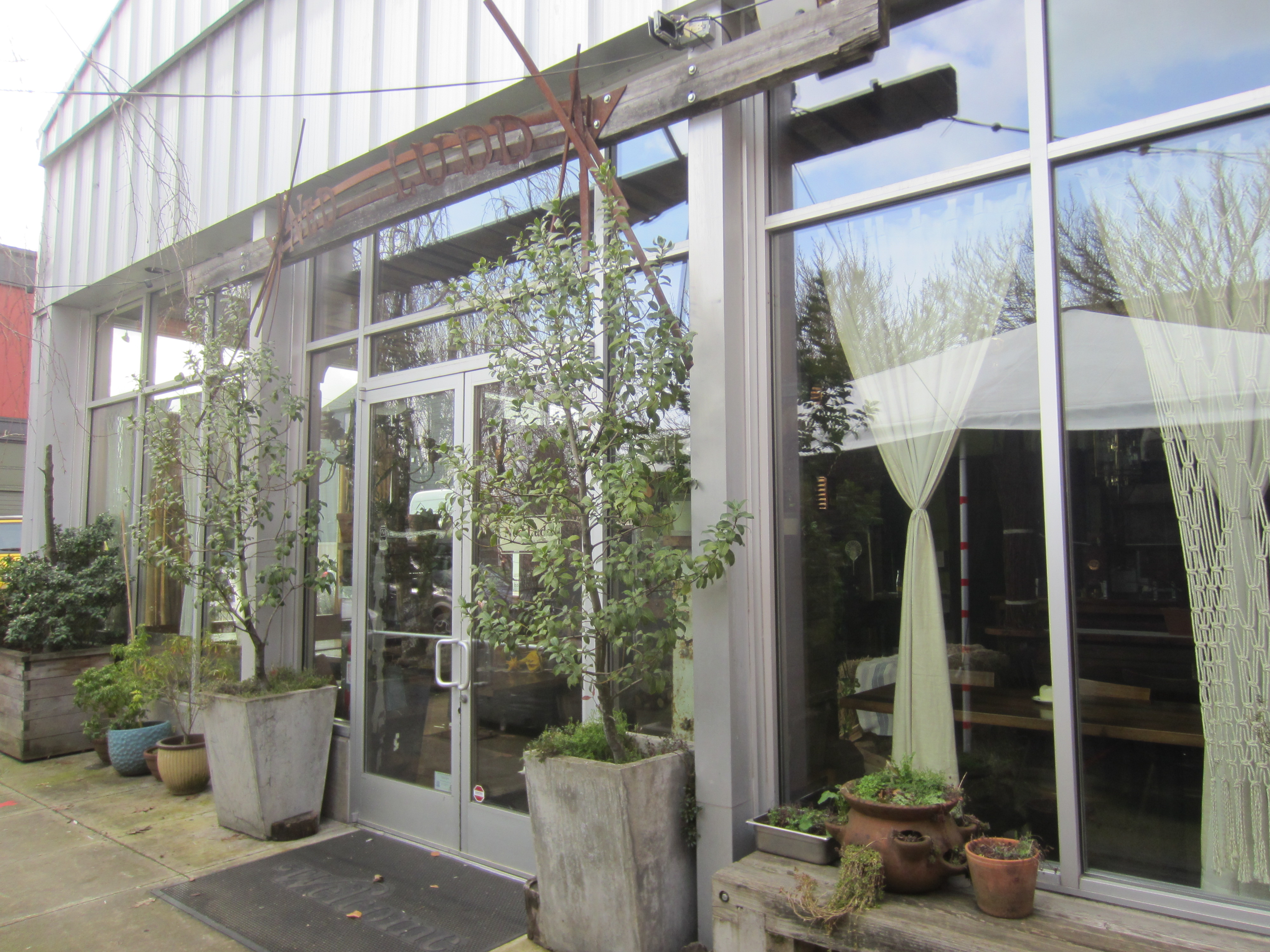
- Cafe Olli operates in the space that previously housed Ned Ludd (pictured in 2021)
- Interactive map of Cafe Olli

Restaurant information
- Established: 2021
- Food type: Italian
- Location: 3925 Northeast Martin Luther King Jr. Boulevard, Portland, Oregon, 97212, United States
- Coordinates: 45°33′4.5″N 122°39′43″W
- Website: cafeolli.com

Cafe Olli is an Italian restaurant in Portland, Oregon, United States. It opened in 2021, in the space that previously housed Ned Ludd.

== Description ==
Cafe Olli is an Italian restaurant in northeast Portland's King neighborhood. Among pastries on the menu are cookies with chunks of chocolate.

== History ==
Established in December 2021, Cafe Olli was included in The New York Times's 2023 list of the nation's 50 best restaurants. Cafe Olli operates in the space previously occupied by Ned Ludd.

Cafe Olli's woodshed was set on fire in 2025. During a SNAP program shutdown in 2025, the business made meals available for people "experiencing food insecurity or financial hardship", according to Willamette Week.

Cafe Olli has hosted the seafood pop-up restaurant Merrow. In 2026, Cafe Olli also began hosting the Cajun pop-up Ma Cher, which previously operated at Dame Collective. Ollini has been described as Cafe Olli's "sibling" bakery and wine bar.

== Reception ==
Michael Russell included the chocolate cake in The Oregonian's list of Portland's best dishes of 2024. He also ranked Cafe Olli number 16 in the newspaper's 2025 list of Portland's 40 best restaurants. Taylor Manning and Siobhan Speirits were semifinalists in the "Best Chef: Northwest & Pacific (AK, HI, OR, WA)" category of the James Beard Foundation Awards in 2026.

In 2025, Cafe Olli was included in Eater Portland's lists of the city's best restaurants for brunch, Italian cuisine, and mid-week lunches. Rebecca Roland also included the chocolate cake in the website's 2025 overview of the city's eleven best restaurants for desserts. Paolo Bicchieri included the business in Eater Portland's 2025 overview of the city's best restaurants for lunch. Michelle Lopez and Janey Wong included Cafe Olli in the website's 2025 overview of Portland's best bakeries.

== See also ==
- List of Italian restaurants
