= St. James Lutheran Church (Portland, Oregon) =

Historic church in Portland, Oregon, U.S.

- U.S. National Register of Historic Places
- Portland Historic Landmark
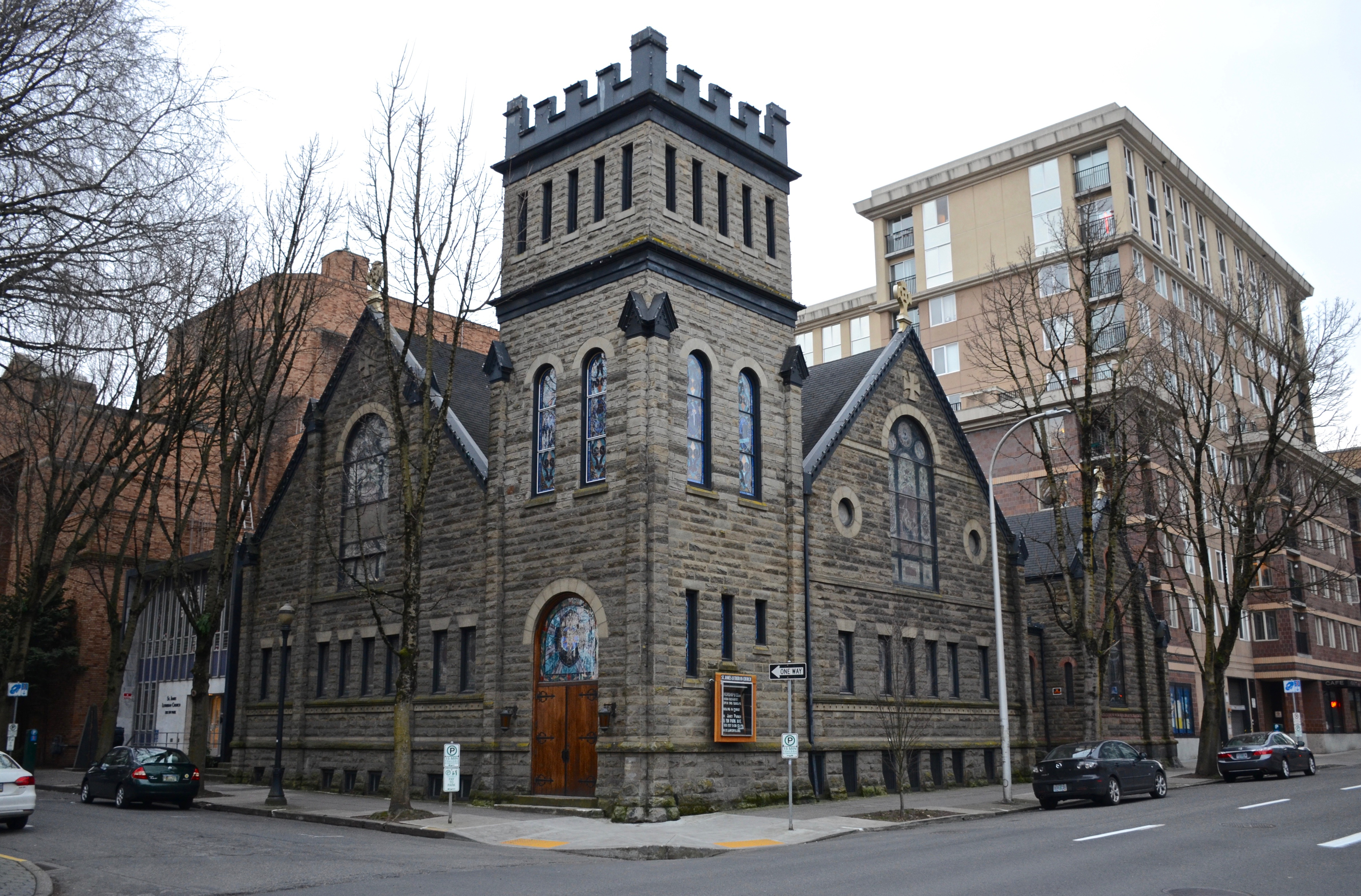
- The main building in 2017, with the original (1891) building in the righthand background

- Location within Portland, Oregon Location within Oregon Location within the United States
- Location: 1315 SW Park Avenue; Portland, Oregon
- Coordinates: 45°30′56″N 122°41′01″W
- Built: 1891 (chapel); 1908 (main building); 1958 (education annex)
- Architect: P. Chappel-Browne
- Architectural style: Late Gothic Revival
- Website: www.stjamespdx.org
- NRHP reference No.: 75001598
- Added to NRHP: May 21, 1975

The St. James Lutheran Church is a church and historic church building located in downtown Portland, Oregon, United States.

== History ==
The congregation was founded in 1889 by missionaries as Portland's first English-speaking Lutheran church. The first pastor was Rev. M. L. Zweizig. The cornerstone for the present building was laid in May 1907. Many of the original fixtures are still in use in the building, including the marble baptismal font and oak pews. The church grew and thrived through the first half of the 20th century, and in 1956 added an educational annex, with space for classrooms and offices. The church was forced to remove the tower of the main building in 1951 due to structural deterioration. The tower was replaced in 1974 using historic photographs to match the original style and design as far as possible.

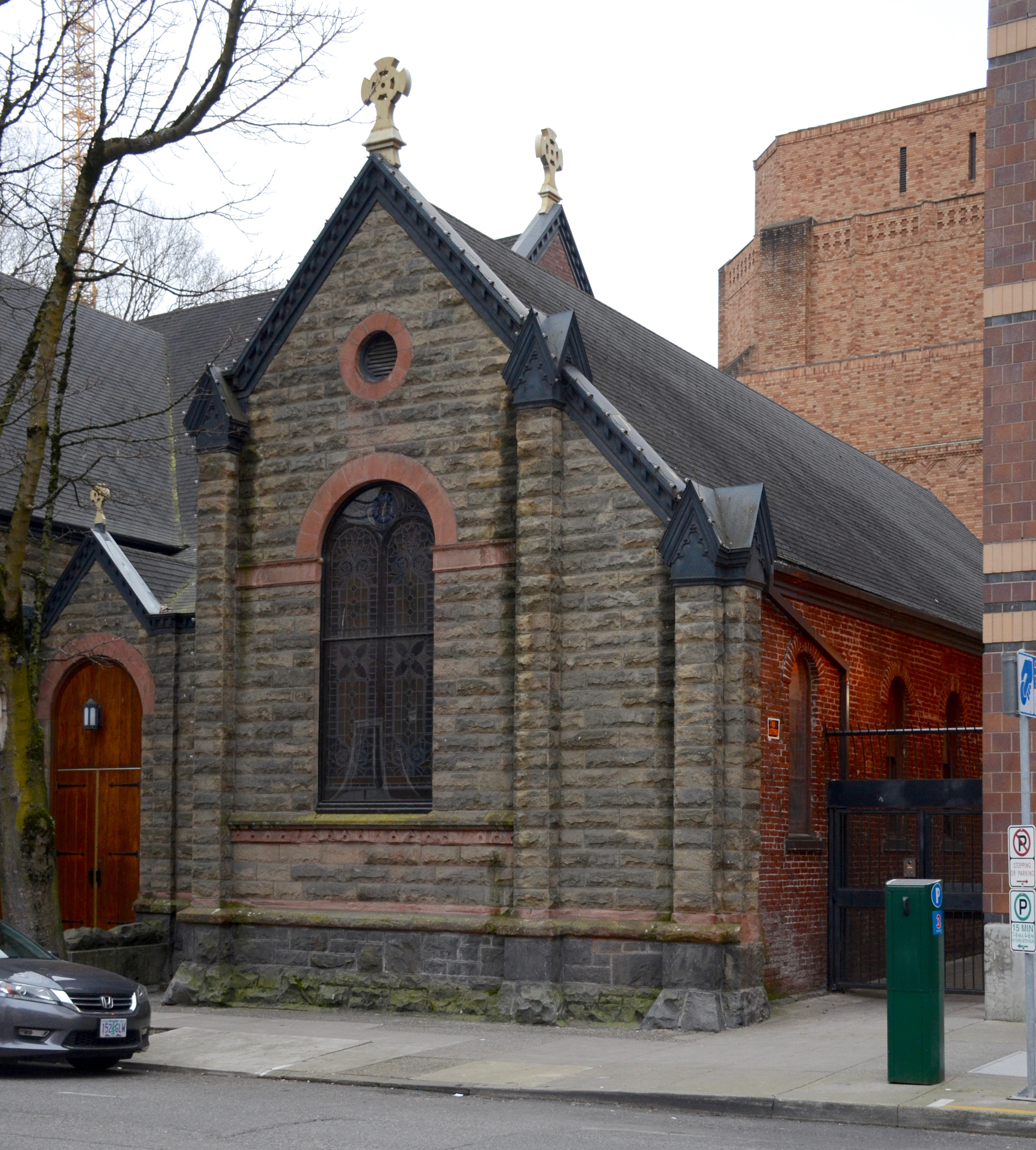
The church's 1891 building, known as the Pioneer Chapel

The St. James building was listed on the National Register of Historic Places in 1975.

== Ministries ==
St. James is a member of the Evangelical Lutheran Church in America and has unique programs and uses the traditional liturgy. In addition, it is home to a yearly series of concert vespers featuring the church cantatas of Johann Sebastian Bach embedded into a worship service, as they were originally designed to be performed.

== See also ==
- Culture of Portland, Oregon
- National Register of Historic Places listings in Southwest Portland, Oregon
- Religion in Portland, Oregon
