= Salty's =

Restaurant chain in the United States

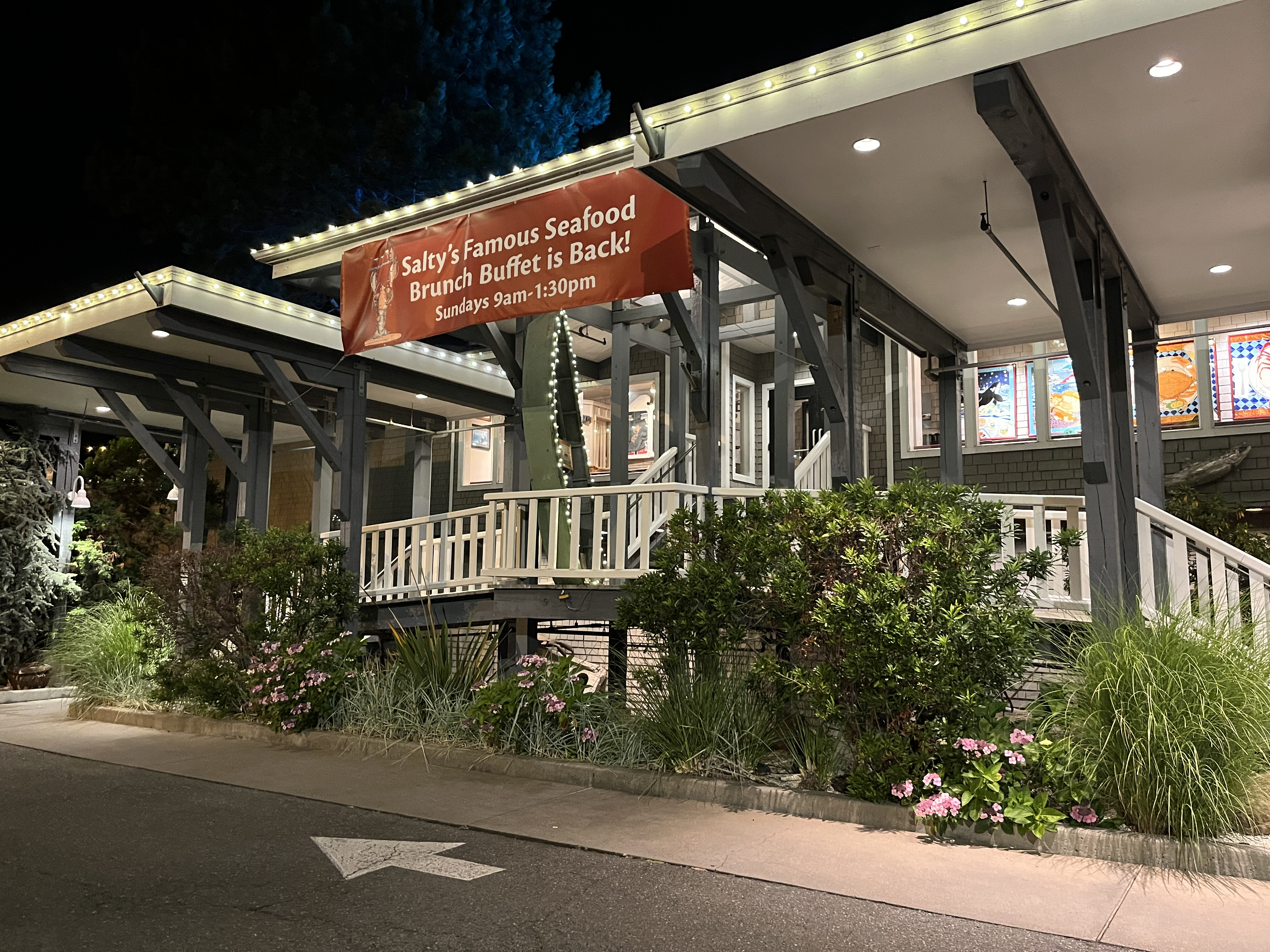
Exterior of the Seattle location at night, 2025

Salty's Waterfront Seafood Grills, or simply Salty's, is a restaurant chain in the United States. The business has operated multiple locations. The restaurant was established in Portland, Oregon in 1978, operating as Salty's on the Columbia. Subsequent locations opened in Des Moines, Washington in 1981, West Seattle (Salty's on Alki Beach) in 1985, and Seattle–Tacoma International Airport (Salty's at the SEA). The business is owned by Gerry and Kathy Kingen. The Des Moines location has since closed.

== Description ==
Salty's locations in Seattle

The restaurant Salty's operates in northeast Portland, Oregon's Sunderland neighborhood, and Seattle, Washington. The Portland restaurant, called Salty's on the Columbia, has a nautical-themed dining room and large windows with views of the Columbia River. The interior has "eclectic" and "fun" artwork, according to Eater Portland. The location has hosted live jazz. The Seattle location, called Salty's at Alki Beach, offers views of the city's skyline.

The menu includes American cuisine and seafood such as halibut and salmon, clams and mussels, Dungeness crab, macaroni and cheese with crab, oysters, prawns, steak, and wine. The restaurant has also served chicken, eggs, ham, prime rib, waffles, and desserts. The happy hour menu has included crab nachos and "adult Lunchables".

== History ==
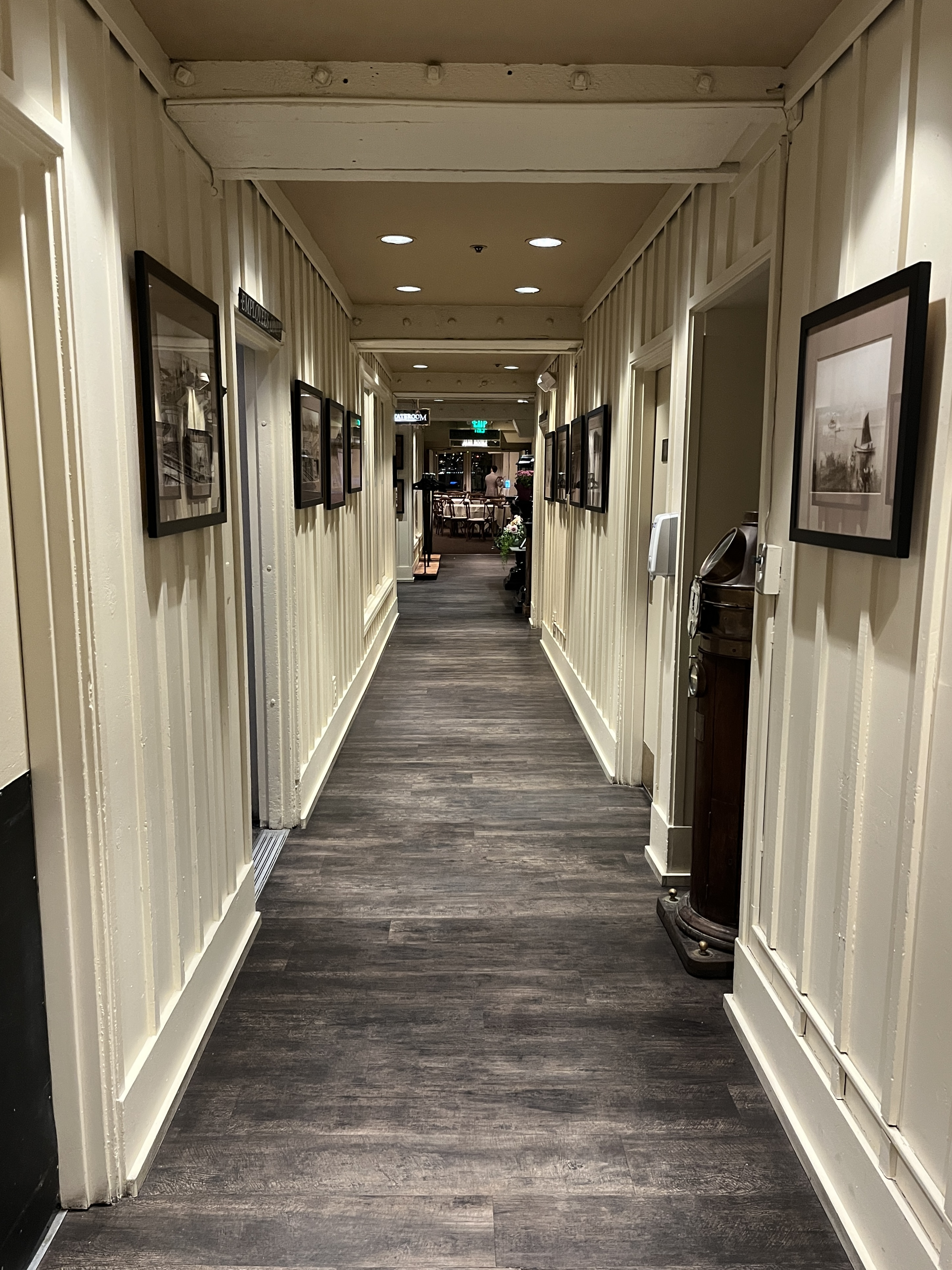
Interior of the Seattle location in 2025

The business is owned by Gerry and Kathy Kingen. The Portland location opened in 1978. A second location opened in Des Moines, Washington in 1981. The Seattle location opened in 1985. Salty's at the SEA operates at Seattle–Tacoma International Airport.

The Portland location has hosted a buffet for Thanksgiving with cocktail shrimp and oysters, garlic bread stuffing, and turkey with chanterelle gravy. For Veterans Day, the restaurant has served white chocolate mousse for veterans at no cost. In 2024, a car drove into a support column for the carport of the Portland location.

== Reception ==
In her 2014 food guide to Portland, Laurie Wolf called the brunch buffet "pretty amazing". In 2015, Cristina Cerullo of Eater Portland said the Portland location was "one of the best" seafood and steak restaurants in the city. In 2017, the website said the location had "a slightly more dressed-up vibe than you get at most fried fish spots". In the website's 2025 overview of Portland's best seafood, Ben Coleman said the restaurant serves "impeccably plated" dishes and offers one of the city's best happy hours.

== See also ==
- List of restaurant chains in the United States
- List of seafood restaurants
