= Mannahouse Church =

Coordinates: 45°33′3″N 122°34′0″W

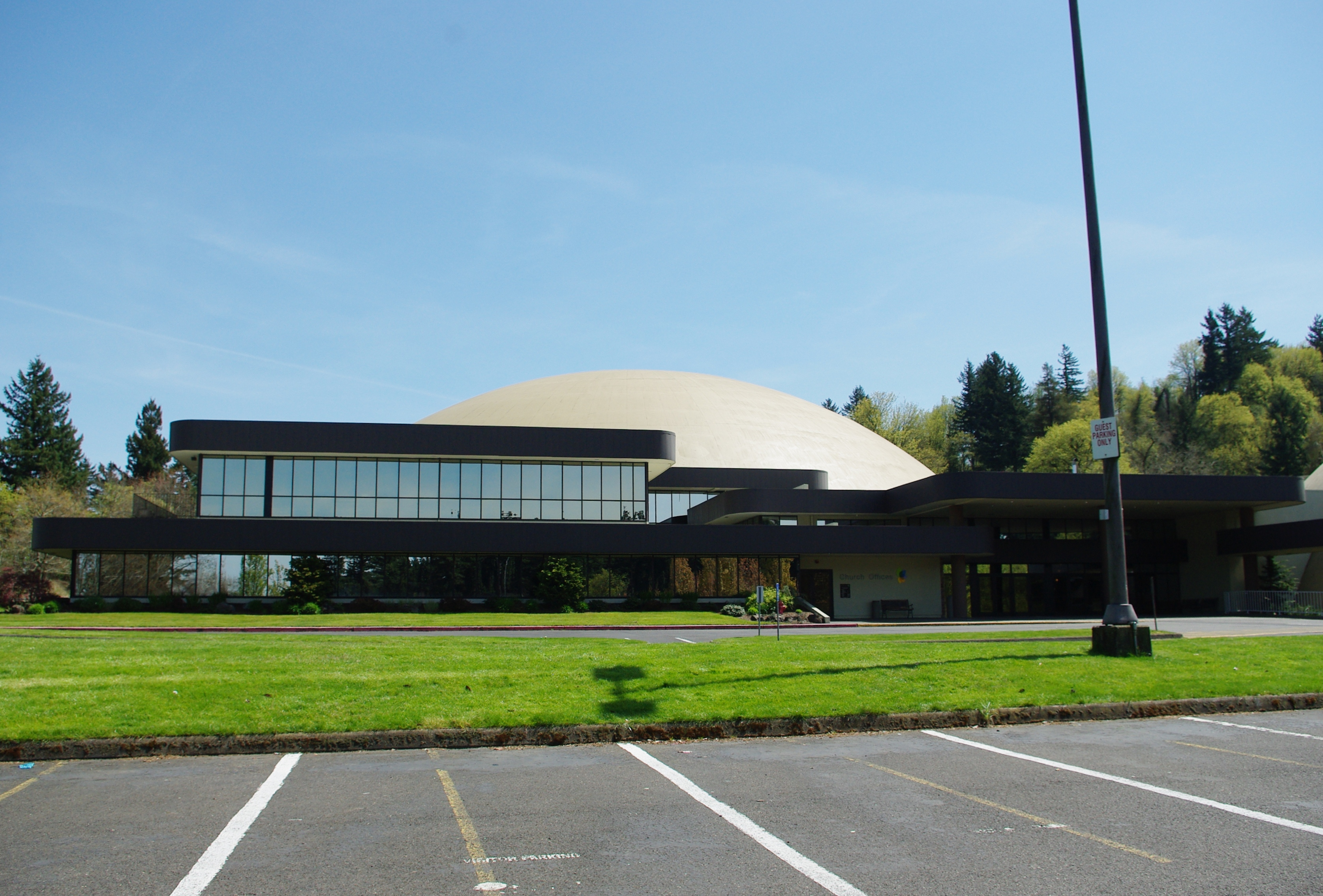
- Church Offices in 2024
- Mannahouse Church
- Location: Portland, Oregon
- Country: United States
- Denomination: Non-denominational, Contemporary worship movement
- Website: www.mannahouse.church

History
- Founded: 1951
- Founder: Dick Iverson

Mannahouse Church (formerly City Bible Church) is a non-denominational Christian megachurch located in Portland, Oregon, U.S. with four campuses.

== History ==
The church started as a group of 13 people in 1951. The church grew rapidly, soon starting a Bible college, tape ministry, a Christian school and a Publishing house. In 2003, a second campus was opened in Tigard, soon followed by campuses in Vancouver, Washington and Downtown Portland and then a church they had planted in Eugene, Oregon became a campus. In 2018, the church changed its name from City Bible Church to Mannahouse Church to "better reflect the role that God has called us to in our time and culture." Mannahouse operates a music school.

== Schools ==
Main Articles: Mannahouse Christian Academy and Portland Bible College

Mannahouse Church operates a Christian School adjacent to their Rocky Butte Campus called Mannahouse Christian Academy (formerly City Christian Schools). They also operate the Portland Bible College.

== See also ==
- List of the largest churches in the US
- Religion in Oregon
- Religion in Washington (state)
