= Ned Ludd (restaurant) =

Restaurant in Portland, Oregon, US

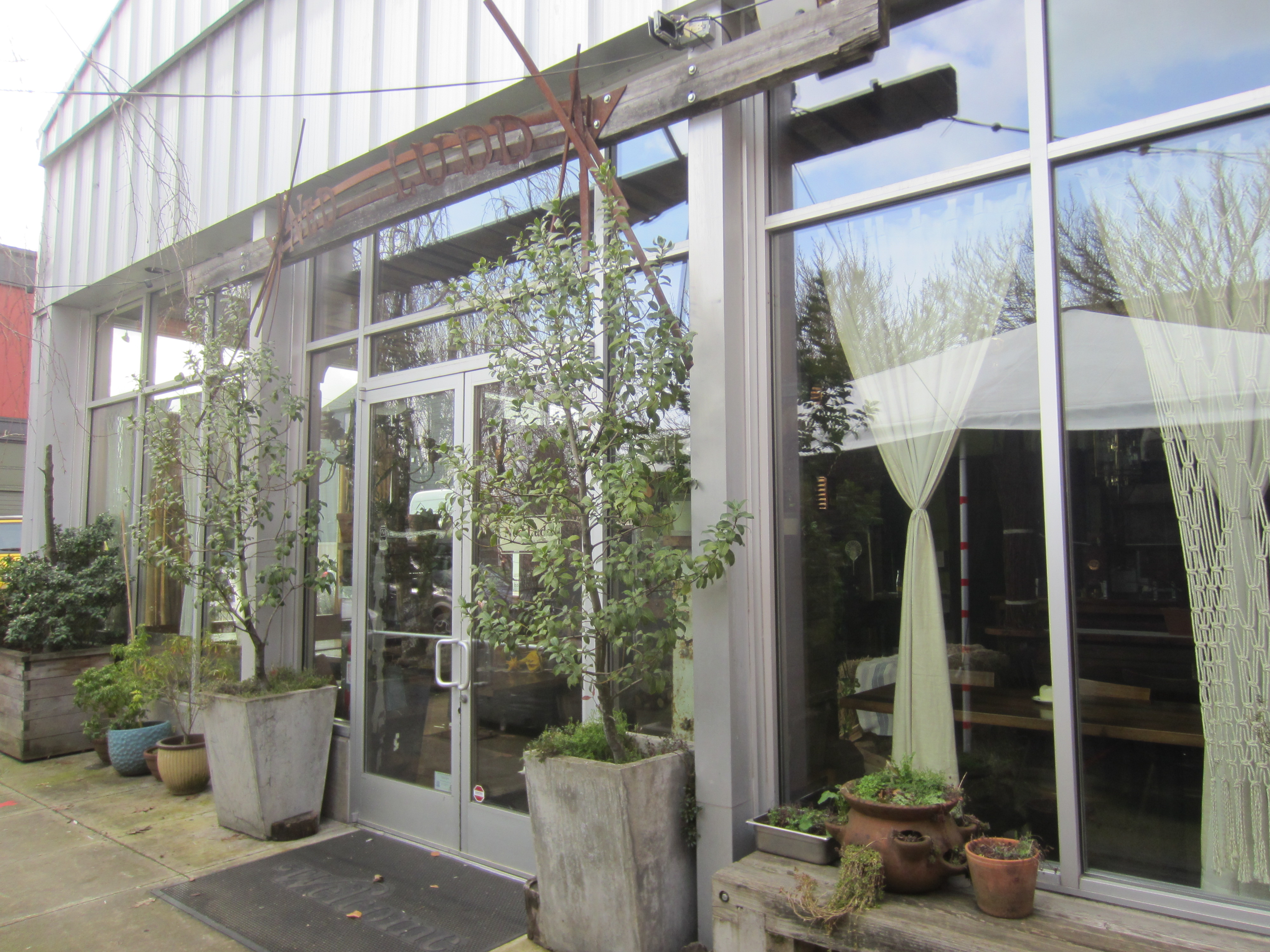
- The restaurant's front entrance in 2021
- Interactive map of Ned Ludd

Restaurant information
- Established: 2008
- Food type: Pacific Northwest
- Location: 3925 Northeast Martin Luther King Blvd., Portland, Oregon
- Coordinates: 45°33′4.4″N 122°39′43.2″W

Ned Ludd was a restaurant in Portland, Oregon's King neighborhood, in the United States. Established in 2008, the restaurant was owned by chef Jason French. It served Pacific Northwest cuisine.

Ned Ludd closed during the COVID-19 pandemic. The space is now occupied by pizzeria Cafe Olli.

== See also ==
- COVID-19 pandemic in Portland, Oregon
- Impact of the COVID-19 pandemic on the restaurant industry in the United States
- List of Pacific Northwest restaurants
