= Portland Bible College =

Christian college in Portland, Oregon, U.S.

- Campus on Rocky Butte
- Type: Private
- Established: 1967
- Religious affiliation: Mannahouse Church
- Chancellor: Derrill Corbin
- President: Simon Mould
- Dean: Mark Daniels
- Students: 400
- Location: 9150 NE Fremont St, Portland, Oregon, U.S. 45°32′58″N 122°33′55″W
- Campus: Urban
- Mascot: Arrows
- Website: www.portlandbiblecollege.org

Portland Bible College (PBC) is a four-year Bible college in Portland, Oregon, United States that offers theological and church ministry degrees. It was founded in 1967 and is associated with Mannahouse Church, which is associated with Ministers Fellowship International. The campus is adjacent to Mannahouse Church on Rocky Butte in northeast Portland.

== Accreditation ==
Portland Bible College has degree granting status from the State of Oregon, the State of Washington and the State of California. This means PBC is unaccredited and as such cannot be guaranteed by either the United States Department of Education or the Council for Higher Education Accreditation to provide quality education. However, PBC has taken positive steps to ensure strong academic standards by holding membership with the Academic Council for Educational Accountability as well as securing several articulation agreements with other accredited seminaries, colleges and universities.

In Oregon, The Higher Education Coordinating Commission lists PBC in its Institutions and Programs Approved for Veterans Affairs.

As for Washington, the Washington Student Achievement Council has determined that Portland Bible College qualifies for religious exempt status from the Degree-Granting Institutions Act.

In California, PBC was issued a verification of exemption pursuant to the California Education Code CEC § 94874.7 as registered with the California Bureau for Private Postsecondary Education.

== Academics ==
The college's former Chancellor, Pastor Marc Estes, states that the college is "committed to training and equipping leaders to strengthen local churches" and "offers training in Pastoral Leadership, Worship & Creative Arts, Pastoral Counseling, and Youth Ministry along with a Humanities Program designed for university transfer." The college awards six different degrees with multiple emphasis, including: Associate of Theology, Associate of Church Music, Associate of Christian Humanities, Bachelor of Church Music, Bachelor of Theology. Over 35 people work as faculty or staff at the college.

The School of Worship and the associated degrees in Church Music seek to provide a "broad knowledge of music, rhythm instruments and worship leading."

According to the college's webpage, for over 40 years PBC has had a consistently high rate of international students. International students make up around "thirty-one percent of the PBC student body" and play "a strong role in defining the core of PBC."

The college has formal transfer agreements with Portland State University, Warner Pacific College, Concordia University, Northwest Christian College and Pittsburg State University (Kansas). On a discretionary basis, the University of California (Berkeley), Arizona State University, Boise State University, Seattle Pacific University, Baylor University and Southeastern University (Florida) have accepted credits earned at the college. George Fox University, Western Seminary, Fuller Theological Seminary, Regent University, Liberty University, Azusa Pacific University and Multnomah University have honored the college’s degrees on a discretionary basis.

== Athletics ==
Portland Bible College Basketball Program was formerly part of the National Christian College Athletic Association (NCCAA) and the Pacific Coast Athletics Conference (PCAC) and competes with NCAA, NAIA, and NCCAA institutions. It has had "12 All-Conference players and five All-American award winners while qualifying for the national tournament five of past six seasons." In November of 2022, they lost a men's basketball game to the Portland State Vikings after allowing the first 38 points of the game, an NCAA record. As of 2025, the school does not have an athletics program.
