= Lone Mountain Nevada Temple =

Temple of The Church of Jesus Christ of Latter-day Saints in Lone Mountain, Nevada

- Under construction
- Interactive map of Lone Mountain Nevada Temple
- Number: 269
- Site: 19.8 acres (8.0 ha)
- Floor area: 70,194 ft^{2} (6,521.2 m^{2})
- Height: 196 ft (60 m)
- Official website • News & images

Additional information
- Announced: 2 October 2022, by Russell M. Nelson
- Groundbreaking: 25 September 2025, by Michael A. Dunn
- Location: Las Vegas, Nevada, United States
- Coordinates: 36°14′09″N 115°18′15″W

The Lone Mountain Nevada Temple is a planned temple of the Church of Jesus Christ of Latter-day Saints in Las Vegas, Nevada. The intent to build the temple was announced on October 2, 2022, by church president Russell M. Nelson during general conference. It is the second in the Las Vegas Valley, after the Las Vegas Nevada Temple, along with two others in the state (in Reno and Elko).

The temple's planned design shows a central tower topped with a gold-colored dome. It was commissioned by the church, using classical design elements with tall arched windows and a symmetrical layout. No groundbreaking ceremony has been scheduled.

== History ==
Latter-day Saint pioneers that settled the area arrived in the 1840s established a trading post by then Carson City (now the state's capital). In 1855, 30 men were called to establish a mission in Southern Nevada, which began a silver mining operation.

The Lone Mountain Nevada Temple was announced by church president Russell M. Nelson on October 2, 2022, during general conference, along with 17 others. According to the church, there are around 180,000 Latter-day Saints across 360 congregations in the state, and about 6% of the state population are church members.

On December 12, 2022, the church announced the temple's location, a 19.8-acre site southwest of Hickam Avenue between North Grand Canyon Drive and Tee Pee Lane in northwest Las Vegas. Initial plans called for a three-story structure of approximately 87,000 square feet. On February 26, 2024, the Church released an exterior rendering, showing the building’s white façade, large arched windows, and a central tower topped with a gold-colored dome.

In May 2024, the proposal for the temple went before the Las Vegas Planning Commission, where it sparked significant public interest. While many Latter-day Saints supported the project, some local residents raised concerns about its size and lighting. After an extensive hearing, the Planning Commission voted unanimously (with one abstention) to recommend approval, subject to conditions addressing neighborhood concerns, such as nighttime lighting restrictions.

On July 17, 2024, the Las Vegas City Council voted unanimously to approve the temple. In response to feedback from city officials and residents, the height of the central spire was reduced from 216 feet to 196 feet to avoid the need for an FAA-mandated aircraft warning light. The square footage was also adjusted to approximately 70,190 square feet. The council also approved the construction of an adjacent meetinghouse (15,982 sq ft) and a maintenance building (1,690 sq ft) as part of the complex.

Shortly after the city’s approval, a lawsuit was filed by local residents opposing the temple’s location, arguing that the project violated zoning rules for rural preservation. The case was heard in early 2025, and in February 2025, a Clark County District Court dismissed the lawsuit, ruling in favor of the City of Las Vegas and allowing the project to proceed.

== Design and architecture ==
The Lone Mountain Nevada Temple is designed in a contemporary style that integrates traditional Latter-day Saint architectural elements. The temple is planned for a 19.8-acre plot southwest of Hickam Avenue, between North Grand Canyon Drive and Tee Pee Lane, in the Lone Mountain neighborhood of Las Vegas. The landscaping plans include over 200 trees, with an emphasis on xeriscaping principles to conserve water. The design has no grass lawns and water features, aligning with sustainable practices suitable for the arid climate.

The temple is planned as a three-story structure, approximately 70,190 square feet in size. The exterior plans for a white façade, complemented by large, arched windows, allowing natural light into the interior spaces. The building will have a central tower, crowned with a gold-colored dome. The design uses elements of both local culture and broader church symbolism. The height and size of the temple is part of the religious meaning and symbolism, meant to draw all eyes towards heaven. According to the Las Vegas Review journal, the church considers that exterior light is also a symbol, wanting to keep the lights on 24 hours a day.

== Cultural and community impact ==
The Lone Mountain Nevada Temple has received a mixed response from the community, with significant support from Latter-day Saints and strong opposition from some local residents.

At city hearings, hundreds of church members attended in support, and thousands submitted written comments favoring the project. They emphasized the spiritual importance of temples, and that it would reduce travel time for members to the other temple in the area. A petition, created by Preserve Rural Las Vegas gained more than 5,000 signatures. Church members put together a counter petition that ended up having more than 10,000 signatures.

However, the project also faced strong opposition, primarily from nearby residents who objected to its size, height, and nighttime lighting. Opponents argued that the temple violated rural preservation zoning rules, as the 196-foot tower and overall scale were seen as inconsistent with the surrounding low-rise, semi-rural neighborhood. Some residents also expressed concerns about increased traffic and light pollution, particularly given the original plan for a 216-foot spire, which was later reduced to avoid FAA-mandated lighting requirements.

Despite these objections, the Las Vegas City Council unanimously approved the project in July 2024, citing compliance with city zoning regulations. Opponents filed a lawsuit arguing that the city had improperly approved the temple in a rural preservation area, listing nine residents that would be affected, but the Clark County District Court dismissed the case in early 2025, ruling in favor of the city. A local director of community development, Seth Floyd, said that the site is outside of a dedicated rural preservation neighborhood.

While opposition remains among some neighbors, the legal challenges have been resolved, allowing the project to move forward. The temple remains a topic of community debate, with supporters highlighting its spiritual significance and architectural beauty, while some residents continue to express concerns about its impact on the neighborhood.

== See also ==

Temples in Nevada

- = Operating
- = Under construction
- = Announced
- = Temporarily Closed

- Comparison of temples (LDS Church)
- List of temples (LDS Church)
- List of temples by geographic region (LDS Church)
- Temple architecture (LDS Church)
- The Church of Jesus Christ of Latter-day Saints in Nevada
