= Las Vegas Temple =

The Las Vegas Temple may refer to one of two temple of the Church of Jesus Christ of Latter-day Saints:

- Las Vegas Nevada Temple, built in 1984.
- Lone Mountain Nevada Temple, currently under construction.
