= Memphis Tennessee Temple =

Latter-day Saint temple in Tennessee

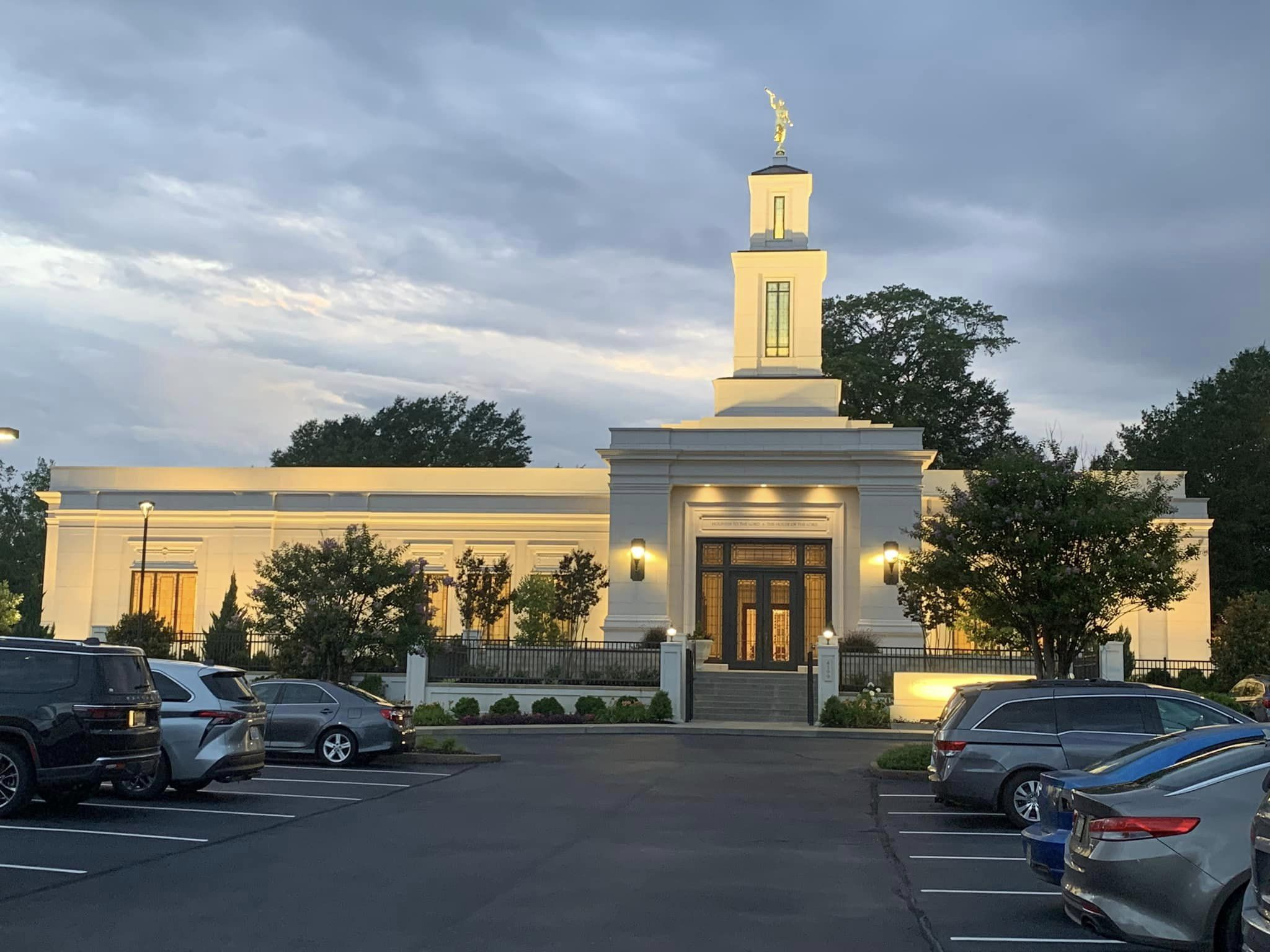
- Memphis Tennessee Temple in 2023
- Interactive map of Memphis Tennessee Temple
- Number: 80
- Dedication: April 23, 2000, by James E. Faust
- Site: 6.35 acres (2.57 ha)
- Floor area: 10,890 ft^{2} (1,012 m^{2})
- Height: 71 ft (22 m)
- Official website • News & images

Church chronology
← Medford Oregon Temple	Memphis Tennessee Temple	→ Reno Nevada Temple

Additional information
- Announced: September 17, 1998, by Gordon B. Hinckley
- Groundbreaking: January 16, 1999, by Gordon T. Watts
- Open house: April 8–15, 2000; April 13–20, 2019
- Rededicated: May 5, 2019, by Jeffrey R. Holland
- Current president: David Mark Lewis
- Designed by: Dusty Driver; Church A&E Services
- Location: Bartlett, Tennessee, United States
- Coordinates: 35°14′26.70720″N 89°50′21.60239″W
- Exterior finish: Imperial Danby White marble
- Design: Classic modern, single-spire design
- Baptistries: 1
- Ordinance rooms: 2 (two-stage progressive)
- Sealing rooms: 2

The Memphis Tennessee Temple is the 80th operating temple of the Church of Jesus Christ of Latter-day Saints (LDS Church). The intent to build the temple was announced on September 17, 1998, by the First Presidency. It was the first temple dedicated in Tennessee, followed by the one in Nashville less than a month later. The temple is located in Bartlett, Tennessee.

== History ==
The temple was announced by the First Presidency on September 17, 1998. Ground was broken for the temple on January 16, 1999. At the time, it served the more than 20,000 members in Tennessee, Arkansas, Mississippi, and Missouri. The temple was dedicated on April 23, 2000, by James E. Faust. Built at an estimated cost of $2 million, it was the second temple announced in the state, after the one in Nashville. Although announced second, the temple in Memphis was dedicated a month before the one in Nashville, becoming the state’s first.

On April 10, 2017, the LDS Church announced that the temple would close in October 2017 for renovations that would be completed in 2019. As the renovations neared completion, the church originally announced there would be no open house, but an update on April 11, 2019, indicated there would be an open house from April 13 to April 20, excluding Sunday. The temple was rededicated on May 5, 2019, by Jeffrey R. Holland.

In 2020, like all the church's other, the Memphis Tennessee Temple was closed in response to the COVID-19 pandemic.

== Design and architecture ==
Designed by Paul D. Gillespie, the temple uses a traditional Latter-day Saint temple design and reflects both the cultural heritage of Memphis and its spiritual significance to the church. The temple is on a 6.35-acre plot, and was constructed with Imperial Danby white marble. The exterior has a single spire with a statue of the angel Moroni at its top.

The interior has art glass, gold leaf pinstriping, antiqued bronze pendant lighting, and decorative rugs. The temple includes two ordinance rooms, two sealing rooms, and a baptistry, each arranged for ceremonial use.

The design has elements representing the heritage of Tennessee, to provide deeper spiritual meaning its appearance and function. Symbolism is important to church members and includes the art glass windows, with the infinity bell flower and lazy eight motifs in shades of blue, green, and coral. Other symbolic elements are found in the decorative rugs, which depict a pawpaw field pattern with a lazy eight border.

=== Renovations ===
Over the years, the temple has undergone several renovations to preserve its structural integrity, update facilities, and enhance its spiritual and aesthetic appeal. The most significant renovation project commenced in 2017.

The renovations focused on rebuilding the temple following issues with mold.The renovated temple was rededicated on May 5, 2019, by Jeffrey R. Holland.

== Temple presidents ==
The church's temples are directed by a temple president and matron, each typically serving for a term of three years. The president and matron oversee the administration of temple operations and provide guidance and training for both temple patrons and staff.

Serving from 2000 to 2004, W. Boyd Lee was the first president, with Dorothy K. Lee serving as matron. As of 2023, Steven L. Ball was the president, with Donna J. Ball as matron.

== Admittance ==
Following construction, a public open house was held from April 8 to 15, 2000, prior to its dedication by James E. Faust on April 23. After the renovations were completed, another open house was held from April 13 to April 20 (excluding Sunday). The temple was rededicated by Jeffrey R. Holland on May 5, 2019.

Like all the church's temples, it is not used for Sunday worship services. To members of the church, temples are regarded as sacred houses of the Lord. Once dedicated, only church members with a current temple recommend can enter for worship.

== See also ==
- Comparison of temples of The Church of Jesus Christ of Latter-day Saints
- List of temples of The Church of Jesus Christ of Latter-day Saints
- List of temples of The Church of Jesus Christ of Latter-day Saints by geographic region
- Temple architecture (Latter-day Saints)
- The Church of Jesus Christ of Latter-day Saints in Arkansas
- The Church of Jesus Christ of Latter-day Saints in Tennessee
- The Church of Jesus Christ of Latter-day Saints in Mississippi

== Additional reading ==
- Topp, Amy (January 23, 1999), "Memphis temple one of two to be built in Volunteer State", Church News
- "Tennessee temple dedications announced", Church News, March 4, 2000
- Avant, Gerry (April 29, 2000), "Remembering roots at Memphis dedication", Church News
- "Facts and figures: Memphis Tennessee Temple", Church News, April 29, 2000
- Devin, Jonathan (July 14, 2010), "A decade of devotion", Memphis Commercial Appeal
- "Memphis temple wins 'America in Bloom' award", Church News, July 26, 2003
