= The Church of Jesus Christ of Latter-day Saints in Nevada =

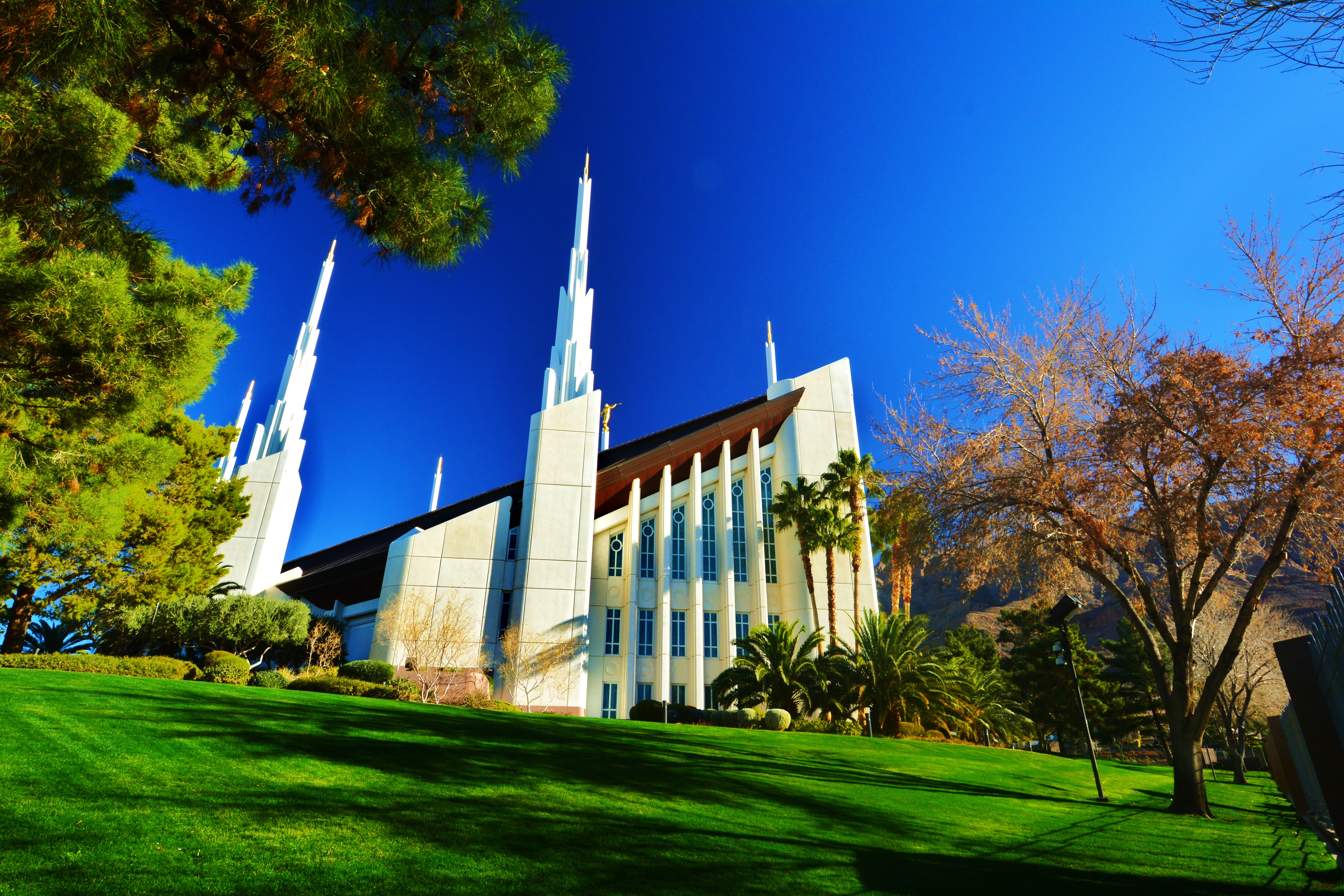
- The Las Vegas Nevada Temple
- Area: US Southwest
- Members: 181,842 (2025)
- Stakes: 43
- Wards: 304
- Branches: 35
- Total Congregations: 339
- Missions: 4
- Temples: 3 operating 1 under construction 4 total
- FamilySearch Centers: 34

The Church of Jesus Christ of Latter-day Saints in Nevada refers to the Church of Jesus Christ of Latter-day Saints and its members in Nevada. Nevada has the 7th most church members of any U.S. state, and the fifth-highest percentage of members. The church is the 2nd largest denomination in Nevada, behind the Roman Catholic Church.

== History ==
Membership in Nevada
Year	Membership
1920	2,328
1930	5,319
1940	9,139
1950	14,223
1960	23,890
1970	44,282
1980	71,462
1990	110,060
1999	143,372
2009	173,639
2019	184,703
2025	181,842
Source: Windall J. Ashton; Jim M. Wall, Deseret News, various years, Church Almanac Country Information: Nevada

In 1855, 30 men were called to establish a mission at the Meadows in southern Nevada.

Gordon B. Hinckley dedicated the Las Vegas Nevada Temple in sessions held December 16–18, 1989 and more than 30,000 Latter-day Saints attended the dedicatory services.

== County Statistics ==
As of 2010, list of members in each county, according to the Association of Religion Data Archives, are shown below:

County	Congregations	Adherents	% of Population
Carson City	7	2,869	5.19
Churchill	7	2,786	11.20
Clark	218	124,291	6.37
Douglas	3	1,710	3.64
Elko	18	7,952	16.29
Esmeralda	0		
Eureka	1	180	9.06
Humboldt	4	2,028	12.27
Lander	3	904	15.65
Lincoln	6	2,323	43.46
Lyon	6	3,598	6.92
Mineral	2	539	11.30
Nye	8	3,370	7.67
Pershing	1	475	7.03
Storey	0		
Washoe	33	19,436	4.61
White Pine	6	2,688	26.80

== Stakes ==
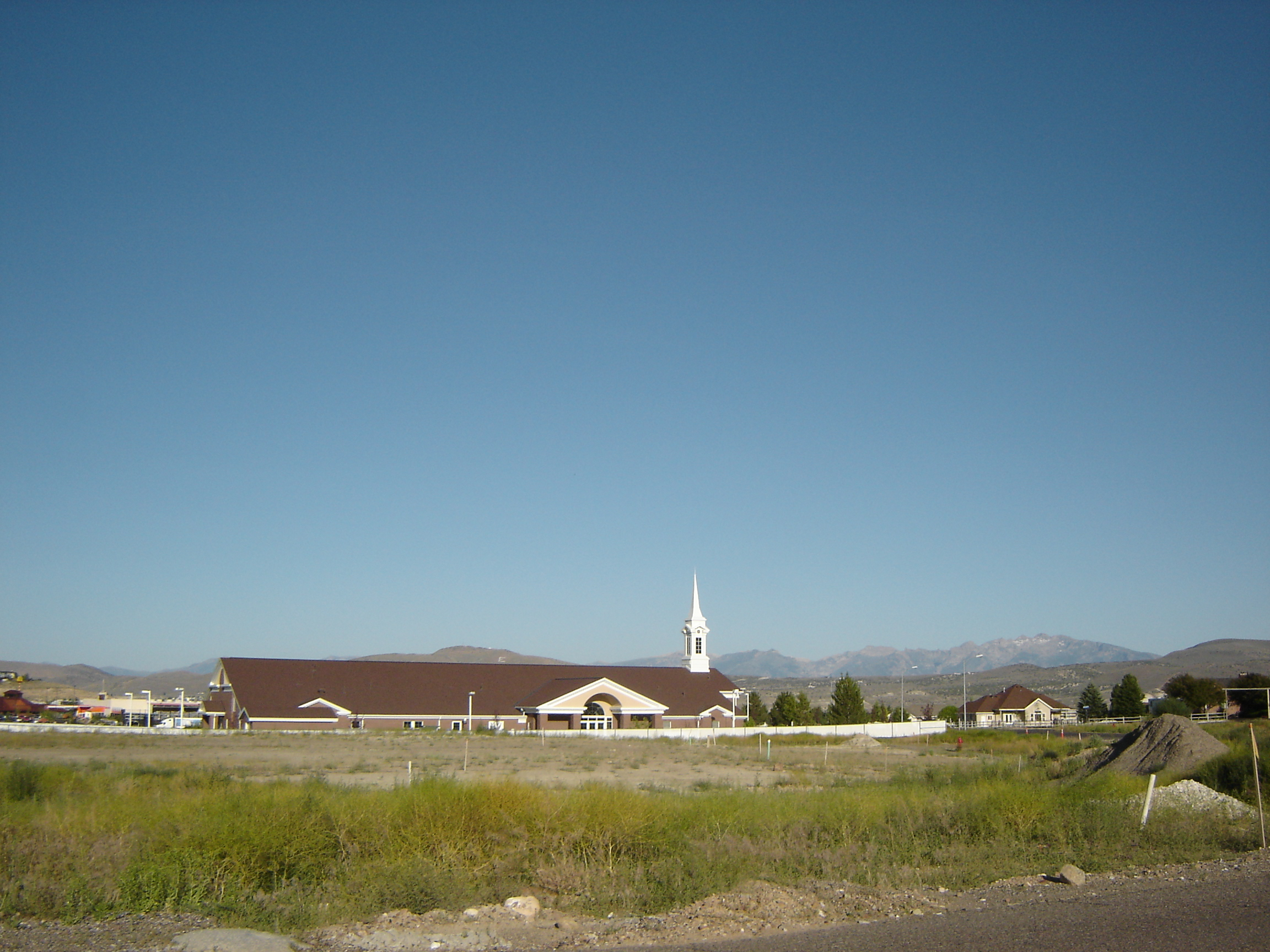
A meetinghouse and stake center in Elko, Nevada.

Stake/District	Organized	Mission	Temple District
Carson City Nevada Stake	9 Apr 1978	Nevada Reno	Reno Nevada
Elko Nevada East Stake	31 May 1942	Nevada Reno	Elko Nevada
Elko Nevada West Stake	19 Mar 1995	Nevada Reno	Elko Nevada
Ely Nevada Stake	19 Sep 1926	Nevada Reno	Elko Nevada
Fallon Nevada South Stake	30 Aug 1987	Nevada Reno	Reno Nevada
Fallon Nevada Stake	18 Jan 1970	Nevada Reno	Reno Nevada
Filer Idaho Stake (Note: Stake located outside Nevada with congregation(s) meeting in Nevada)	15 Jun 1980	Idaho Pocatello	Twin Falls Idaho
Henderson Nevada Anthem Hills Stake	22 Jan 2017	Nevada Henderson	Las Vegas Nevada
Henderson Nevada Black Mountain Stake	11 Mar 1973	Nevada Henderson	Las Vegas Nevada
Henderson Nevada Carnegie Stake	21 Apr 2002	Nevada Henderson	Las Vegas Nevada
Henderson Nevada Eldorado Stake	27 Apr 2008	Nevada Henderson	Las Vegas Nevada
Henderson Nevada Green Valley Stake	3 Mar 1985	Nevada Henderson	Las Vegas Nevada
Henderson Nevada Lake Mead Stake	19 Aug 1956	Nevada Henderson	Las Vegas Nevada
Henderson Nevada McCullough Hills Stake	15 Nov 2015	Nevada Henderson	Las Vegas Nevada
Las Vegas Nevada Aliante Stake	9 Dec 2001	Nevada Las Vegas East	Las Vegas Nevada
Las Vegas Nevada Blue Diamond Stake	8 Jan 2017	Nevada Las Vegas West	Las Vegas Nevada
Las Vegas Nevada Central Stake	18 Feb 1968	Nevada Las Vegas East	Las Vegas Nevada
Las Vegas Nevada Desert Foothills Stake	3 Dec 2017	Nevada Las Vegas West	Las Vegas Nevada
Las Vegas Nevada East Stake	30 Apr 1978	Nevada Las Vegas East	Las Vegas Nevada
Las Vegas Nevada Elkhorn Springs Stake	7 Dec 2008	Nevada Las Vegas East	Las Vegas Nevada
Las Vegas Nevada Lakes Stake	23 Jun 1985	Nevada Las Vegas West	Las Vegas Nevada
Las Vegas Nevada Lone Mountain Stake	4 Nov 1990	Nevada Las Vegas West	Las Vegas Nevada
Las Vegas Nevada Meadows Stake	20 Mar 1983	Nevada Las Vegas West	Las Vegas Nevada
Las Vegas Nevada Paradise Stake	24 Jan 1965	Nevada Henderson	Las Vegas Nevada
Las Vegas Nevada Redrock Stake	14 Aug 1977	Nevada Las Vegas West	Las Vegas Nevada
Las Vegas Nevada Shadow Mountain Stake	13 Dec 2015	Nevada Las Vegas East	Las Vegas Nevada
Las Vegas Nevada Skye Canyon Stake	6 Dec 2015	Nevada Las Vegas West	Las Vegas Nevada
Las Vegas Nevada South Stake	29 Mar 1970	Nevada Las Vegas West	Las Vegas Nevada
Las Vegas Nevada Spring Mountain Stake	25 Jun 2006	Nevada Las Vegas West	Las Vegas Nevada
Las Vegas Nevada Stake	10 Oct 1954	Nevada Las Vegas West	Las Vegas Nevada
Las Vegas Nevada Sunrise Stake	17 Nov 1985	Nevada Las Vegas East	Las Vegas Nevada
Las Vegas Nevada Tule Springs Stake	3 Dec 1995	Nevada Las Vegas East	Las Vegas Nevada
Las Vegas Nevada Warm Springs Stake	4 Nov 1990	Nevada Henderson	Las Vegas Nevada
Logandale Nevada East Stake	9 Jun 1912	Nevada Las Vegas East	Las Vegas Nevada
Logandale Nevada West Stake	5 May 2024	Nevada Las Vegas East	Las Vegas Nevada
Mesquite Nevada East Stake	13 Feb 1994	Utah St George	St. George Utah
Mesquite Nevada West Stake	15 Jan 2023	Utah St George	St. George Utah
North Las Vegas Nevada Stake	6 Nov 1960	Nevada Las Vegas East	Las Vegas Nevada
Panaca Nevada Stake	29 Jan 1995	Nevada Las Vegas East	Cedar City Utah
Reno Nevada Mount Rose Stake	10 Apr 2016	Nevada Reno	Reno Nevada
Reno Nevada Red Hill Stake	12 Jun 2016	Nevada Reno	Reno Nevada
Reno Nevada Stake	9 Feb 1941	Nevada Reno	Reno Nevada
Sparks Nevada Pyramid Lake Stake	22 Oct 1961	Nevada Reno	Reno Nevada
Wendover Utah District	12 Jun 2016	Utah Salt Lake City West	Elko Nevada
Winnemucca Nevada Stake	11 Oct 1981	Nevada Reno	Elko Nevada

== Missions ==
On July 1, 1975, the Nevada Las Vegas Mission was organized from the Arizona Tempe and California Sacramento missions. Due to growth of missionary work in the area, the Nevada Las Vegas Mission split, creating the Nevada Las Vegas West Mission. On July 1, 2012, the Las Vegas and Las Vegas West Missions were realigned, and the Nevada Reno Mission was created. On November 1, 2023, a new mission in the Henderson area, from area in the Las Vegas East Mission, was announced and became effective in July 2024.

Missions	Organized
Nevada Las Vegas Mission	1 July 1975
Nevada Las Vegas West Mission	1 July 1997
Nevada Reno Mission Mission	1 July 2012
Nevada Henderson Mission	1 July 2024

In addition to these missions, the Utah St George Mission serves the Mesquite Nevada Stake.

== Temples ==

Temples in Nevada

- = Operating
- = Under construction
- = Announced
- = Temporarily Closed

Nevada currently has 2 temples in operation, 1 under construction, and 1 announced.

43. Las Vegas Nevada Temple; Official website; News & images	
Location: Announced: Groundbreaking: Dedicated: Size: Style:	Sunrise Manor, Nevada, United States; April 7, 1984 by Spencer W. Kimball; November 30, 1985 by Gordon B. Hinckley; December 16, 1989 by Gordon B. Hinckley; 80,350 sq ft (7,465 m^{2}) on a 10.3-acre (4.2 ha) site Modern, six-spire design - designed by Tate & Snyder Architects
81. Reno Nevada Temple; Official website; News & images	
Location: Announced: Groundbreaking: Dedicated: Size: Style: Notes:	Reno, Nevada, United States; April 12, 1999 by Gordon B. Hinckley; July 24, 1999 by Rex D. Pinegar; April 23, 2000 by Thomas S. Monson; 10,700 sq ft (990 m^{2}) on a 7.9-acre (3.2 ha) site Classic modern, single-spire design - designed by Church A&E Services; Second temple built in Nevada, following Las Vegas Temple.
209. Elko Nevada Temple; Official website; News & images	
Location: Announced: Groundbreaking: Dedicated: Size:	Elko, Nevada, United States; 4 April 2021 by Russell M. Nelson; 7 May 2022 by Paul B. Pieper; 12 October 2025 by Gary E. Stevenson; 12,901 sq ft (1,198.5 m^{2}) on a 5.2-acre (2.1 ha) site
269. Lone Mountain Nevada Temple (Under construction); Official website; News & images	
Location: Announced: Groundbreaking: Size:	Las Vegas, Nevada, United States; 2 October 2022 by Russell M. Nelson; 25 September 2025 by Michael A. Dunn; 70,194 sq ft (6,521.2 m^{2}) on a 19.8-acre (8.0 ha) site

== Communities ==
Latter-day Saints had a significant role in establishing and settling communities within the "Mormon Corridor", including the following in Nevada:

- Barclay
- Bunkerville
- Crystal Springs
- Genoa
- Las Vegas
- Lund
- Mesquite
- Metropolis
- Moapa Valley
- Muddy River
- Overton
- Panaca
- St. Joseph
- St. Thomas

== Notable Latter-day Saints from Nevada ==
- Brian Crane - Creator of award-winning Pickles comic strip.
- Brandon Flowers - 10x UK Albums Chart Topper, 7x Grammy Award Nominee
- Lloyd D. George - Former U.S. District Court Judge, Federal Courthouse Namesake
- Jim Gibbons (American politician) - Former Governor of Nevada
- Cresent Hardy - Former U.S. Representative from Nevada, 4th district
- Dean Heller- Former U.S. Senator from Nevada
- Mark Hutchison - Former Lieutenant Governor of Nevada
- Gladys Knight - Rock N Roll Hall of Fame Inductee, 7x Grammy Award Winner, Kennedy Center Honoree
- John Jay Lee - Former Mayor of North Las Vegas
- Harry Reid - Former U.S. Senate Majority Leader, International Airport Namesake
- Thomas L. Steffen - Former Nevada Supreme Court Justice

== See also ==
- Mormon Station State Historic Park
- Old Las Vegas Mormon Fort State Historic Park
- State of Deseret
- Religion in Nevada
