= The Church of Jesus Christ of Latter-day Saints in Tennessee =

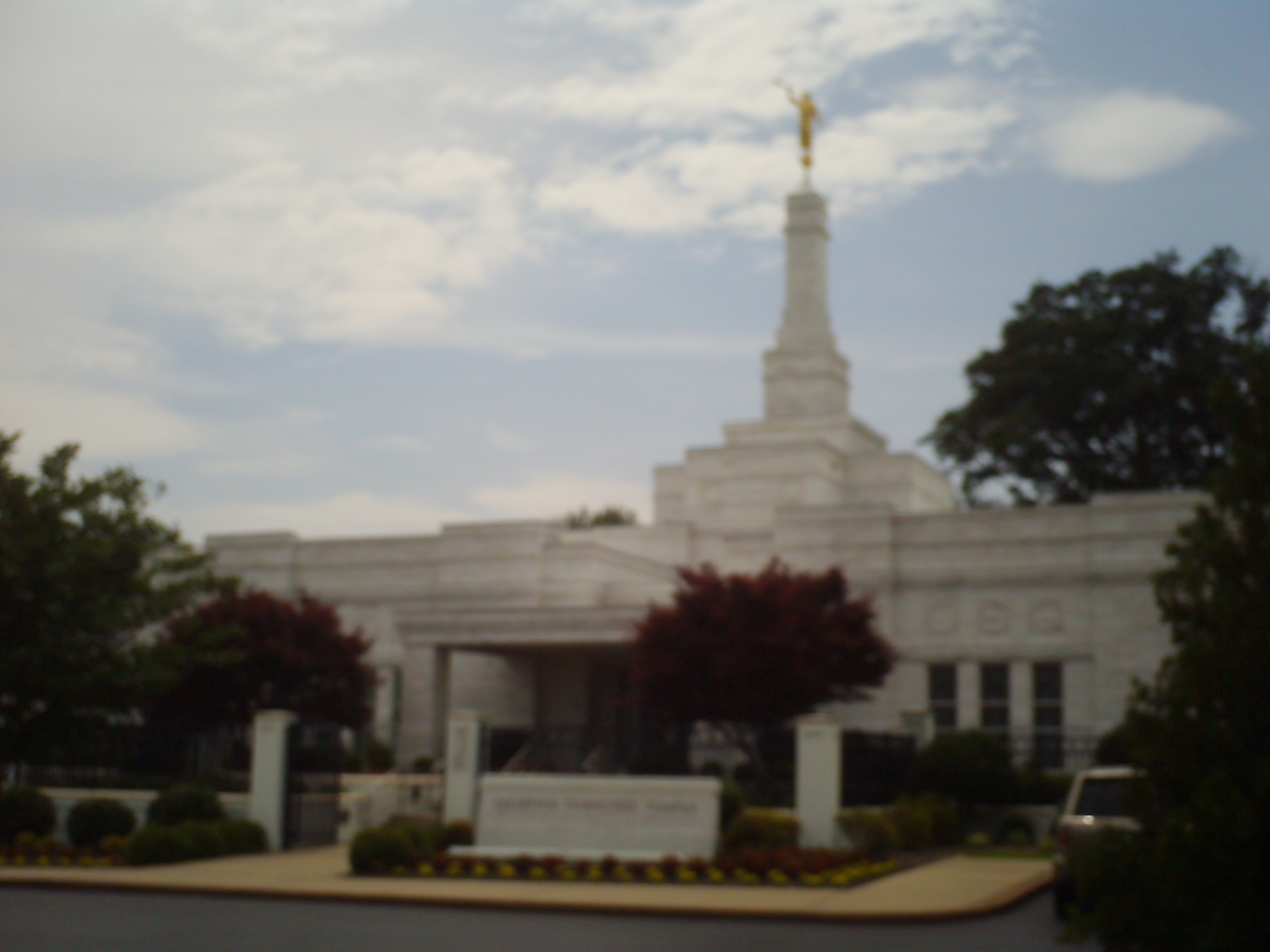
- The Memphis Tennessee Temple
- Area: US Southeast
- Members: 61,991 (2025)
- Stakes: 14
- Wards: 93
- Branches: 28
- Total Congregations: 121
- Missions: 2
- Temples: 2 operating 1 under construction 3 total
- FamilySearch Centers: 35

The Church of Jesus Christ of Latter-day Saints in Tennessee refers to the Church of Jesus Christ of Latter-day Saints (LDS Church) and its members in Tennessee. The first branch in Tennessee was organized in 1834. Church membership has since grown to 61,991 people in 121 congregations.

Official church membership as a percentage of general population was 0.75% in 2014. According to the 2014 Pew Forum on Religion & Public Life survey, roughly 1% of Tennesseans self-identified most closely with the LDS Church. The LDS Church is the 10th largest denomination in Tennessee.

== History ==
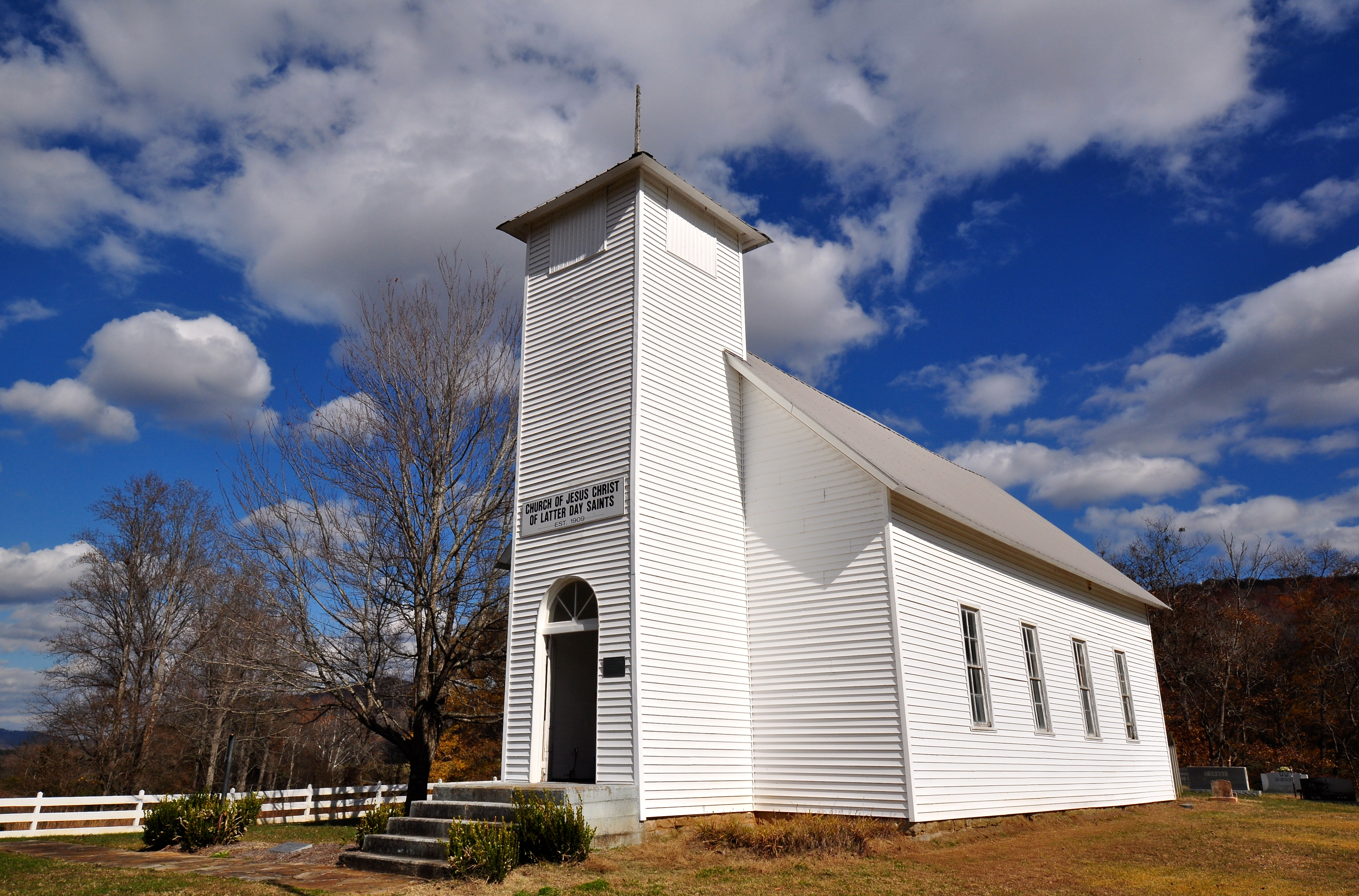
The Northcutts Cove Chapel is the oldest existing meetinghouse in the Southeastern United States.

Membership in Tennessee
Year	Members
1834	31
1890	136
1906	841
1930	2,832
1980	15,839
1990	23,007
1999	31,104
2009	43,179
2019	52,920
2025	61,991
Source: Windall J. Ashton; Jim M. Wall, Deseret News, various years, Church Almanac State Information: Tennessee

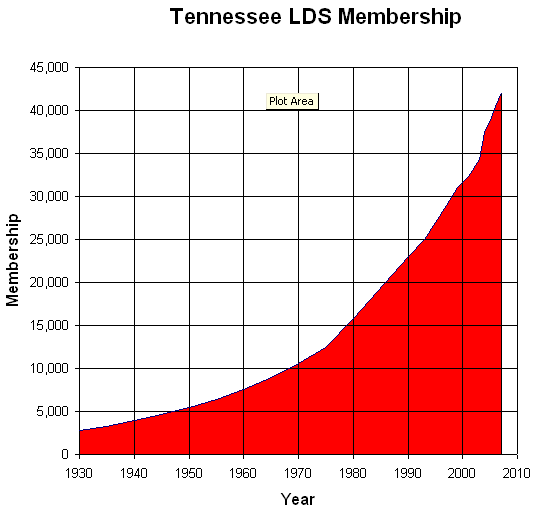
Tennessee LDS membership history

David W. Patten and Warren Parish arrived in Tennessee shortly before 11 October 1834 and soon baptized 31 people: organizing a branch by the end of the year. These efforts were in Henry, Benton, and Humphreys counties. In 1835, Parrish worked alone after Patten returned to Kirtland, Ohio.

On March 27, 1835, Wilford Woodruff, then a priest, came to assist Parrish. When Parrish was called as a seventy in July 1835, he ordained Woodruff as an elder and placed him in charge of the work in Tennessee. Woodruff was assisted by Abraham O. Smoot and Benjamin L. Clapp.

In 1836, there were about 100 members in seven branches. By 1839, 12 branches existed in the state and by 1846, missionaries had preached in 26 counties. Following the exodus to the West, little work was done in Tennessee. Hyrum H. Blackwell and Emmanuel M. Murphy visited the state in 1857 to call the saints to gather in the west.

In 1870, Hayden Church resumed work in Tennessee. The Southern States Mission was formally organized in 1875 with headquarters in Nashville, then moved to Chattanooga in 1882 and remained there until 1919, when Atlanta, Georgia became mission headquarters.

Henry G. Boyle established a branch at Shady Grove in 1875. Mob activity increased significantly in 1879. Some converts in the South left their homes and migrated to the west in 1883.

In 1884, members were fired upon in separate incidents. James Rosskelley was shot in eastern Tennessee on August 8, 1884. Rosskelley would survive and his attacker was captured and bound over for trial. The largest attack on church members in the South was the Cane Creek Massacre, which occurred on August 10, 1884. An armed mob shot and killed missionaries William S. Berry and John H. Gibbs and local members W. Martin Conder and John Riley Hutson during LDS Church services at the home of W. James Conder on Cane Creek in Lewis County. Malinda Conder was injured as well in the attack but recovered enough to walk with a cane. Brigham H. Roberts, then serving as the mission president donned a disguise, traveled to the tense area and retrieved the bodies of the slain missionaries. Many of the church members at Cane Creek left in November 1884, emigrating to Colorado. In 1888, another group of 177 Latter-day Saints left Chattanooga for Colorado and Utah.

By the 1890s, public opinion became more tolerant. The oldest existing meetinghouse in the Southeast was dedicated in Northcutts’ Cove on October 24, 1909, by Charles A. Callis. Ten years later, branches were listed in Chattanooga and Memphis. On November 16, 1925, a chapel in Memphis was dedicated by George F. Richards of the Quorum of the Twelve. By 1930, about 2832 members lived in the Middle and East Tennessee Districts.

On April 18, 1965, the Memphis Stake, Tennessee's first, was created by Howard W. Hunter of the Quorum of the Twelve. On March 15–16, 1997, more than 6500 people attended a meeting where church president Gordon B. Hinckley spoke in the Knoxville Civic Coliseum.

Following Hurricane Katrina in 2005, several thousand Latter-day Saint volunteers, from a seven-state area (including Tennessee), went to Louisiana and Mississippi. Many of them took time out of their jobs or came down on the weekends to help anyone needing assistance (Mormon and non-Mormon).

LDS Church members in Tennessee volunteered relief in their own area on several occasions including the April 2, 2006 tornado outbreak, and the April 6–8, 2006 tornado outbreak.

In 2007, 360 members of the Mormon Tabernacle Choir and 65 members of the Orchestra at Temple Square performed at the Gaylord Entertainment Center in Nashville (June 30), and at the FedEx Forum in Memphis (July 2).

In September 2008, Latter-day Saints from both of the Memphis stakes went to the Baton Rouge area to aid cleanup efforts following Hurricane Gustav.

== Stakes ==
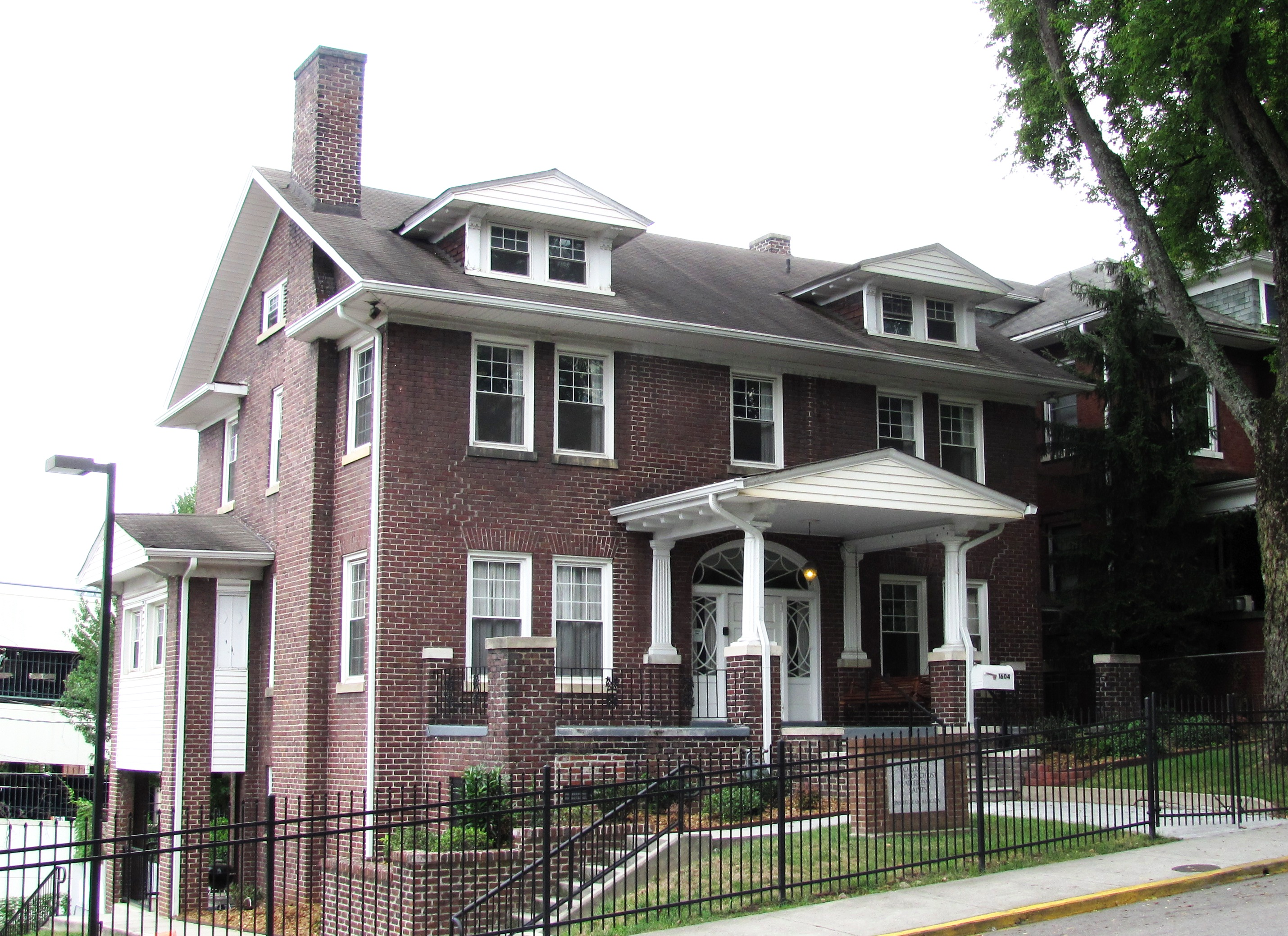
The Knoxville Institute of Religion Building

As of October 2026, the following stakes were located in Tennessee:

Stake	Organized	Mission	Temple district
Bowling Green Kentucky (Note: Stake located outside Tennessee with congregation(s) meeting in Tennessee)	June 14, 2026	Tennessee Nashville	Nashville Tennessee
Chattanooga Tennessee	May 21, 1978	Tennessee Knoxville	Atlanta Georgia
Clarksville Tennessee	May 21, 1978	Tennessee Nashville	Nashville Tennessee
Cleveland Tennessee	June 8, 2025	Tennessee Knoxville	Atlanta Georgia
Columbia Tennessee	March 22, 2026	Tennessee Nashville	Nashville Tennessee
Cookeville Tennessee	May 1, 2016	Tennessee Knoxville	Nashville Tennessee
Franklin Tennessee	December 2, 1979	Tennessee Nashville	Nashville Tennessee
Johnson City Tennessee	March 9, 2025	Tennessee Knoxville	Columbia South Carolina
Kingsport Tennessee	January 13, 1980	Tennessee Knoxville	Columbia South Carolina
Knoxville Tennessee	June 25, 1972	Tennessee Knoxville	Nashville Tennessee
Knoxville Tennessee Cumberland	November 17, 1996	Tennessee Knoxville	Nashville Tennessee
Madison Tennessee	June 9, 2007	Tennessee Nashville	Nashville Tennessee
McMinnville Tennessee	August 18, 1991	Tennessee Nashville	Nashville Tennessee
Memphis Tennessee	April 18, 1965	Arkansas Little Rock	Memphis Tennessee
Memphis Tennessee North	September 14, 1980	Arkansas Little Rock	Memphis Tennessee
Mount Juliet Tennessee Stake	October 18, 2026	Tennessee Nashville	Nashville Tennessee
Murfreesboro Tennessee	November 3, 2012	Tennessee Nashville	Nashville Tennessee
Nashville Tennessee	December 6, 1970	Tennessee Nashville	Nashville Tennessee
Paducah Kentucky	October 20, 1996	Tennessee Nashville	Nashville Tennessee

== Missions ==
The Southern States Mission was formally organized in 1875 with its headquarters in Nashville. In 1882, the headquarters moved to Chattanooga, until it moved to Atlanta, Georgia in 1919. Tennessee remained in the Southern States Mission until the creation of the East Central States Mission in 1928. In 1975, the Tennessee Nashville Mission was organized. In 1993, the Tennessee Knoxville Mission was organized from the Tennessee Nashville Mission.

Mission	Current mission president
Tennessee Nashville Mission	Matthew K. Stepan
Tennessee Knoxville Mission	Andrew Croshaw

== Temples ==
On November 12, 1994, a letter sent to priesthood leaders announced plans to build a temple in Nashville. However, after three unsuccessful years of trying to gain approvals, church leaders announced on April 25, 1998, they would move ahead with plans to build a temple somewhere else in the Nashville area and said the temple would be substantially smaller in size. That fall, on September 17, 1998, the First Presidency announced it would build a second temple in Tennessee, this one in Memphis. The temple, in the suburb of Bartlett, was dedicated on April 23, 2000. The next month, on May 21, 2000, the Nashville Tennessee Temple, in the suburb of Franklin, was dedicated.

On April 3, 2022, church president Russell M. Nelson announced plans to build a temple in the Knoxville area. The location of the temple was announced at 13001 Kingston Pike in Farragut.

Temples in Tennessee

= Operating
= Under construction
= Announced

= Temporarily Closed

80. Memphis Tennessee Temple; Official website; News & images	
Location: Announced: Groundbreaking: Dedicated: Rededicated: Size: Style:	Bartlett, Tennessee, United States; September 17, 1998 by Gordon B. Hinckley; January 16, 1999 by Gordon T. Watts; April 23, 2000 by James E. Faust; May 5, 2019 by Jeffrey R. Holland; 10,890 sq ft (1,012 m^{2}) on a 6.35-acre (2.57 ha) site Classic modern, single-spire design - designed by Dusty Driver; Church A&E Services
84. Nashville Tennessee Temple; Official website; News & images	
Location: Announced: Groundbreaking: Dedicated: Size: Style:	Franklin, Tennessee, United States; November 9, 1994 by Howard W. Hunter; March 13, 1999 by John K. Carmack; May 21, 2000 by James E. Faust; 10,700 sq ft (990 m^{2}) on a 6.86-acre (2.78 ha) site Classic modern, single-spire design - designed by Robert Waldrip and Church A&E Services
234. Knoxville Tennessee Temple (Dedication scheduled); Official website; News & images	
Location: Announced: Groundbreaking: Open House: Dedicated: Size:	Farragut, Tennessee; 3 April 2022 by Russell M. Nelson; 27 January 2024 by Shayne M. Bowen; 27 January-13 February 2027 scheduled for 7 March 2027; 30,000 sq ft (2,800 m^{2}) on a 4.99-acre (2.02 ha) site

== Prominent members connected with Tennessee ==
D. Todd Christofferson, called to the Quorum of the Twelve Apostles on April 5, 2008, was senior vice president and general counsel for Commerce Union Bank of Tennessee in Nashville. He was also active in community affairs and interfaith organizations. He was the chair of the Middle Tennessee Literacy Coalition and the chair of Affordable Housing of Nashville.

== See also ==
- The Church of Jesus Christ of Latter-day Saints membership statistics (United States)
