= Cochabamba Bolivia Temple =

LDS Church temple in Cochabamba, Bolivia

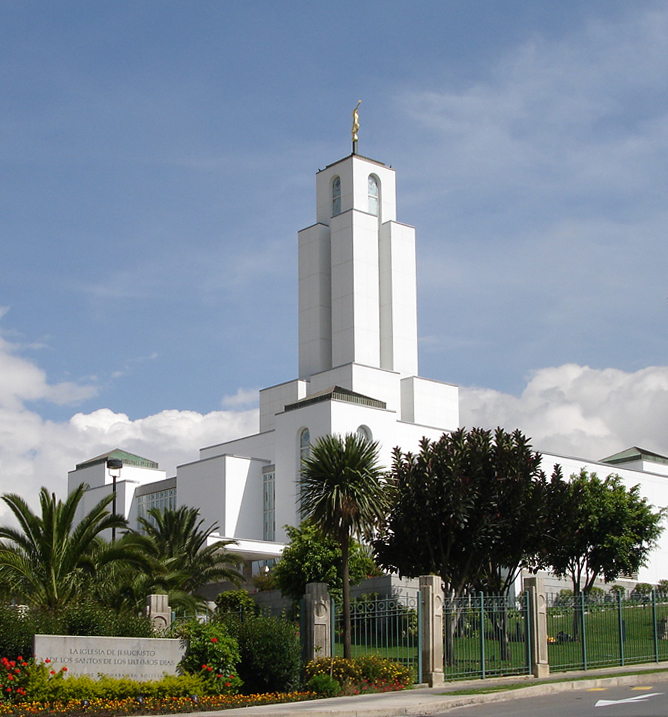
- Interactive map of Cochabamba Bolivia Temple
- Number: 82
- Dedication: 30 April 2000, by Gordon B. Hinckley
- Site: 6.67 acres (2.70 ha)
- Floor area: 33,302 ft^{2} (3,093.9 m^{2})
- Official website • News & images

Church chronology
← Reno Nevada Temple	Cochabamba Bolivia Temple	→ Tampico Mexico Temple

Additional information
- Announced: 13 January 1995, by Gordon B. Hinckley
- Groundbreaking: 10 November 1996, by Gordon B. Hinckley
- Open house: 18–22 April 2000
- Current president: Rene Juan Cabrera Balanza
- Designed by: BSW and Church A&E Services
- Location: Cochabamba, Bolivia
- Coordinates: 17°21′49.24440″S 66°8′51.82799″W
- Exterior finish: Blend of hand-hewn Comanche granite and plaster
- Design: Classic modern, single-tower design reflecting the Bolivian culture
- Baptistries: 1
- Ordinance rooms: 2 (stationary)
- Sealing rooms: 3
- Clothing rental: Yes

The Cochabamba Bolivia Temple is a temple of the Church of Jesus Christ of Latter-day Saints in Cochabamba, Bolivia. The intent to build the temple was announced on January 13, 1995, by the church's First Presidency. It is the first in Bolivia and the church's 82nd operating temple worldwide. The temple has a multilevel tower on a square base that stands above the structure, and the front has five tall, arched windows of art glass. The temple was designed by BSW and church personnel, using a classic modern design reflecting Bolivian culture. A groundbreaking ceremony, to signify the beginning of construction, was held on November 10, 1996, with church president Gordon B. Hinckley presiding.

== History ==
The temple was announced by the First Presidency on January 13, 1995, simultaneously with the announcement for the Recife Brazil Temple, the first temple announcements for South America since the Bogotá Colombia Temple in 1984.

The groundbreaking ceremony took place on November 10, 1996, marking the commencement of construction. This ceremony was presided over by church president Gordon B. Hinckley and was attended by an estimated 3,000 to 4,000 people from across the country, some traveling 20 hours by bus to be there. The groundbreaking occurred during one of the heaviest rainstorms the area had seen in ten years. Hinckley greeted the gathered members by saying, "My beloved and wet brothers and sisters." In the groundbreaking prayer, Hinckley said, "We thank thee for this beautiful site, where this sacred edifice will be erected for the people of this great land and where it will remain as a remembrance of the testimonies that we have in our hearts that life is eternal and everlasting." At the ceremony, Hinckley challenged members to obtain a temple recommend and promised to return in approximately two years to dedicate the temple.

Following completion of construction, the church announced the public open house that was held from April 18 to 22, 2000. Originally, the temple open house was scheduled for two weeks, but due to civil unrest in Cochabamba related to attempts to privatize the municipal water supply, the first week was cancelled. Church leaders anticipated approximately 50,000 visitors over the two-week period but were pleased when 65,570 people toured the temple during the single week. A local church members stated at the dedication that approximately 20,000 people visited in one day, and visitors were lined up for blocks and stayed until midnight.

The Cochabamba Bolivia Temple was dedicated by Hinckley on April 30, 2000, with four sessions held. A total of 9,084 church members from Bolivia attended the services, the first temple dedication in their country. Rene Cabrera, an area seventy, who was baptized in 1972, told the Church News at the dedication that "during the groundbreaking ceremony in 1996, [President Hinckley] said he would return in two years when the temple was finished. True, it has been a little more time than that, and some doubted, but this is a great blessing for us." In the dedicatory prayer, Hinckley recognized the founder of Bolivia, Simón Bolívar, who died the year the church was organized.

In 2020, like all the church's others, the Cochabamba Bolivia Temple was closed for a time in response to the COVID-19 pandemic.

== Design and architecture ==
The temple is on a 6.51-acre plot. Behind the temple, the Andes Mountains provide a backdrop, and flower beds decorate the temple grounds. The temple is located on the northern side of Cochabamba at Avenida Melchor Urquidi 1500, Alto Queru Queru.

It is a two-story structure, measuring 137 feet by 102 feet, and 35,500 square feet. Constructed with an exterior blend of hand-hewn Comanche granite and plaster, the building uses a classic modern design. The front has five tall, arched windows of art glass. A multilevel tower on a square base stands above the building. The design uses elements to reflect Bolivian culture. The building was designed by BSW and church personnel, with Javier Mendieta as project manager and CBI being the contractor.

The temple has two ordinance rooms, three sealing rooms, and a baptistry.

== Temple leadership and admittance ==
The church's temples are directed by a temple president and matron, each typically serving for a term of three years. The president and matron oversee the administration of temple operations and provide guidance and training for both temple patrons and staff. Serving from 2000 to 2002, VerNon A. Bingham was the first president, with Bernice P. Bingham serving as matron. As of 2025, Rene Juan Cabrera Balanza is the president, with Teresa de Perales Vizcarra de Cabrera serving as matron.

=== Admittance ===
After construction was completed, the church announced the public open house that was held from April 18 to 22, 2000. Like all the church's temples, it is not used for Sunday worship services. To members of the church, temples are regarded as sacred houses of the Lord. Once dedicated, only church members with a current temple recommend can enter for worship.

== See also ==
Temples in Bolivia
Red = Operating
Blue = Under Construction
Yellow = announced
Black = Closed for Renovations
- Jay E. Jensen, temple president (2013–2016)
- Comparison of temples of The Church of Jesus Christ of Latter-day Saints
- List of temples of The Church of Jesus Christ of Latter-day Saints
- List of temples of The Church of Jesus Christ of Latter-day Saints by geographic region
- Temple architecture (Latter-day Saints)
- The Church of Jesus Christ of Latter-day Saints in Bolivia

== Additional reading ==
- Hart, John L. (Nov 23, 1996), "Prophet breaks ground for new temples", Church News
- Hart, John L. (Sep 20, 1997), "Faith paved way for temple in Bolivia", Church News
- "Temples now planned in 30 nations", Church News, March 28, 1998
- "Dedication dates set for Reno and Cochabamba temples", Church News, March 25, 2000
- "Facts and figures: Cochabamba Bolivia Temple", Church News, May 13, 2000
- "Country information: Bolivia", Church News, Jan 25, 2010
- Johnston, Jerry; Hart, John L. (May 13, 2000), "Worthy of the heart of a people", Church News
- Swensen, Jason (May 15, 2010), "'City in the Clouds' — Devotion defines members from world's highest capital city", Church News
