= Elko Nevada Temple =

Latter-day Saint temple in Nevada, US

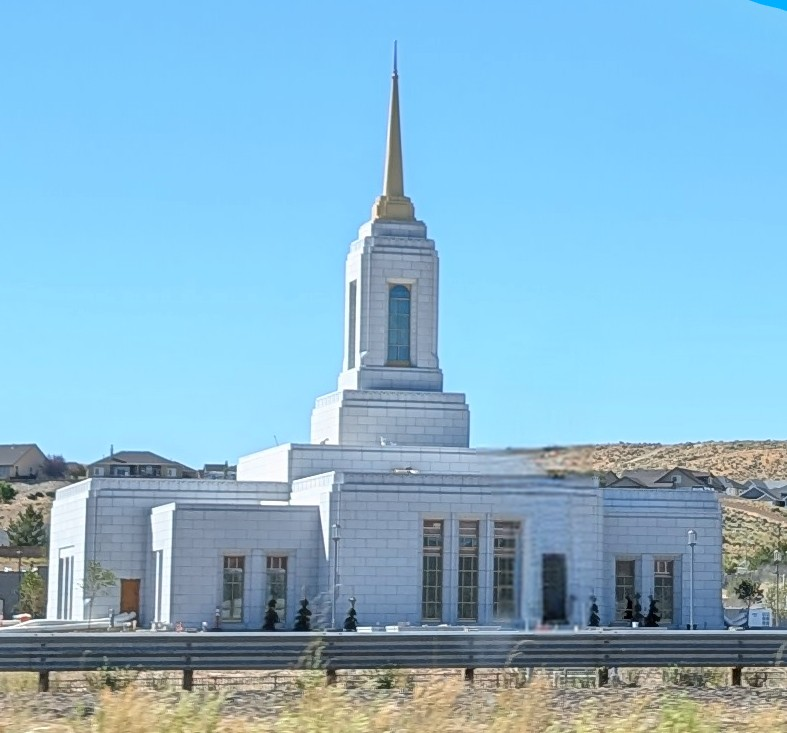
- Interactive map of Elko Nevada Temple
- Number: 209
- Dedication: 12 October 2025, by Gary E. Stevenson
- Site: 5.2 acres (2.1 ha)
- Floor area: 12,901 ft^{2} (1,198.5 m^{2})
- Official website • News & images

Church chronology
← Farmington New Mexico Temple	Elko Nevada Temple	→ Grand Junction Colorado Temple

Additional information
- Announced: 4 April 2021, by Russell M. Nelson
- Groundbreaking: 7 May 2022, by Paul B. Pieper
- Open house: 30 August-13 September 2025
- Location: Elko, Nevada, United States
- Coordinates: 40°51′10″N 115°45′02″W
- Baptistries: 1
- Ordinance rooms: 1
- Sealing rooms: 1

The Elko Nevada Temple is a temple of the Church of Jesus Christ of Latter-day Saints located in Elko, Nevada. Announced in April 2021 by church president Russell M. Nelson, the temple is on a 5.2-acre site close to Interstate 80. Built by Parkway Construction and Architecture, the design is a single-story with a central spire of 109 feet in height, with approximately 10,040 square feet. A groundbreaking ceremony was held on May 7, 2022, and after construction was completed a public open house was held from August 30 to September 13, 2025 (excluding Sundays). It was dedicated on October 12, 2025, by Gary E. Stevenson of the Quorum of the Twelve Apostles.

The temple's dedication was held during the apostolic interregnum following the death of Nelson. It one of three temples in church history dedicated during such an interregnum (the others being the Nauvoo Temple, dedicated in 1846 following the death of Joseph Smith, and the Manti Utah Temple, dedicated in 1888 following the death of John Taylor).

== History ==
The intent to construct the Elko Nevada Temple was announced by church president Russell M. Nelson during general conference, one of 20 announced that day. A groundbreaking ceremony was held on May 7, 2022, with Paul B. Pieper, a church general authority, presiding. The invitation-only event marked the beginning of construction and was attended by regional and local church leaders and community leaders. It was also broadcast to church members in the temple district.

The temple is on a 5.2-acre site near a golf course, and is a single-story structure of approximately 10,000 square feet, which serves Latter-day Saints in northeastern Nevada and surrounding areas. It is the church's third temple in Nevada and the northernmost in the state.

== Design and architecture ==
The temple is on a 5.2-acre site on Ruby Vista Drive in Elko. It is a single-story building with a gold-colored central spire rising to 109 feet. It has a white exterior with rectangular windows and an arched main entrance. The structure includes an instruction room, a sealing room, and a baptistry.

It is expected to reduce travel time for church members in northeastern Nevada who previously traveled to temples in Reno, Las Vegas, or neighboring states.

== Temple practices & access ==
The church's temples are directed by a temple president and matron, each typically serving for a term of three years. The president and matron oversee the administration of temple operations and provide guidance and training for both temple patrons and staff. Ken Bowler is its first president, with Robin L. Bowler serving as matron.

A media day was held on August 27, 2025, followed by tours for invited guests the following two days. A public open house was held from August 30 through September 13, 2025, excluding Sundays. It was dedicated on October 12, 2025, by Gary E. Stevenson, with the meeting broadcast to congregations in the temple district.

Like all the church's temples, it is not used for Sunday worship services. To members of the church, temples are regarded as sacred houses of the Lord. Once dedicated, only church members with a current temple recommend can enter for worship.

== See also ==
- Comparison of temples of The Church of Jesus Christ of Latter-day Saints
- List of temples of The Church of Jesus Christ of Latter-day Saints
- List of temples of The Church of Jesus Christ of Latter-day Saints by geographic region
- Temple architecture (Latter-day Saints)
