= Tampico Mexico Temple =

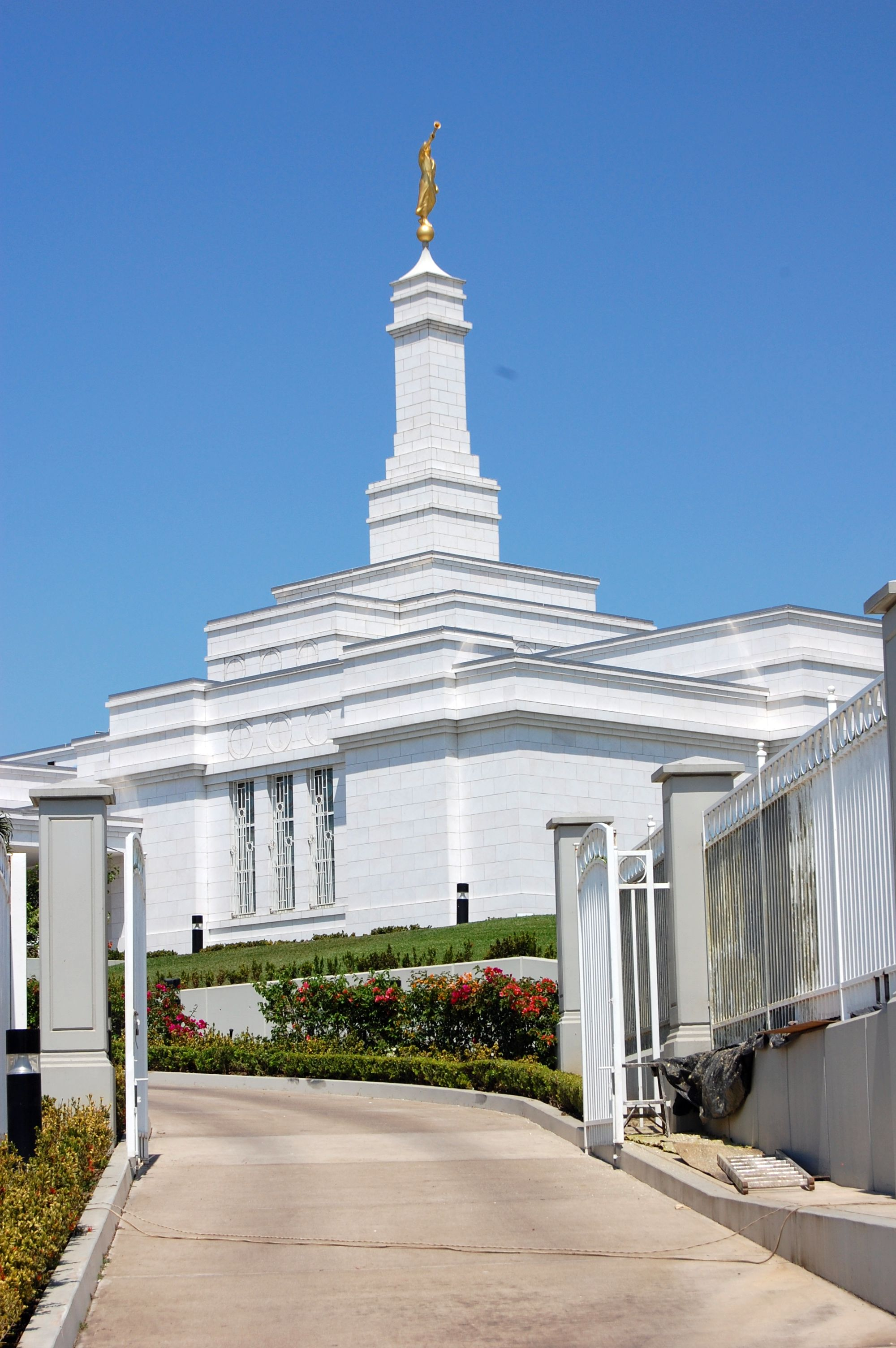
- Temple #83, Tampico, Mexico
- Interactive map of Tampico Mexico Temple
- Number: 83
- Dedication: 20 May 2000, by Thomas S. Monson
- Site: 2.96 acres (1.20 ha)
- Floor area: 10,700 ft^{2} (990 m^{2})
- Height: 71 ft (22 m)
- Official website • News & images

Church chronology
← Cochabamba Bolivia Temple	Tampico Mexico Temple	→ Nashville Tennessee Temple

Additional information
- Announced: 8 July 1998, by Gordon B. Hinckley
- Groundbreaking: 28 November 1998, by Eran A. Call
- Open house: 29 April – 6 May 2000
- Current president: Victor Esparza Villasana
- Designed by: Alvaro Inigo and Church A&E Services
- Location: Ciudad Madero, Mexico
- Coordinates: 22°15′15.34320″N 97°51′21.12839″W
- Exterior finish: Blanco Guardiano white marble from Torreón, Mexico
- Design: Classic modern, single-spire design
- Baptistries: 1
- Ordinance rooms: 2 (two-stage progressive)
- Sealing rooms: 2

The Tampico Mexico Temple is a temple of the Church of Jesus Christ of Latter-day Saints in Ciudad Madero, Tamaulipas, Mexico. The intent to build the temple was announced by the First Presidency on July 8, 1998. It is the seventh in Mexico and the church's 83rd operating temple worldwide. Located on a site locally known as "Cerro de Conejos" or "Rabbit Hill," the temple has a single spire with a statue of the angel Moroni on top, with the exterior being Blanco Guardiano white marble from Torreón, Mexico. The temple was designed by architect Alvaro Inigo and the church's architectural and engineering personnel. A groundbreaking ceremony was held on November 28, 1998, conducted by Eran A. Call, a General Authority Seventy and counselor in the Mexico South Area presidency. The temple was dedicated on May 20, 2000, by Thomas S. Monson, first counselor in the First Presidency.

== History ==
The Tampico Mexico Temple was announced on July 8, 1998, by the First Presidency. This continued an effort to construct temples throughout the world to bring them closer to church members in various regions. At the time of the announcement, Tampico had experienced significant growth, expanding from one stake to four stakes in approximately 25 years, with about 18,000 members residing in the temple district.

The temple was built on a 3.73-acre site at Avenida Ejército Mexicano 74, Colonia Lomas del Gallo, in Ciudad Madero, part of the greater Tampico metropolitan area. The site included plans for an adjoining meetinghouse. The property held significance for local residents, as it occupied land known as "Cerro de Conejos," or "Rabbit Hill," a hillside where residents had historically gone to pray and meditate. About 20 years before the temple's construction, when the church considered selling the land, local stake president Roberto de Leon Perales urged its leaders to retain the property, stating that a temple would one day be built there.

The groundbreaking ceremony took place on November 28, 1998, with Eran A. Call, a General Authority Seventy and counselor in the Mexico South Area presidency, presiding. The temple's construction held special meaning for Thomas S. Monson, who had organized the first stake in Tampico in 1972 as a member of the Quorum of the Twelve Apostles. His return to the area nearly three decades later to dedicate the temple represented a significant milestone in the region's growth.

Prior to the dedication, members in the Tampico area traveled 500-miles across the Sierra Madre mountain range to reach the Mexico City Mexico Temple, which was both difficult and expensive. The new temple in Tampico substantially reduced these burdens for members living in the twin cities of Tampico and Ciudad Madero.

After construction was completed, a public open house was held from April 29 to May 6, 2000, during which 11,135 people toured the temple. The temple was dedicated on May 20, 2000, by Monson, first counselor in the First Presidency, in four dedicatory sessions attended by 5,066 church members. L. Tom Perry, of the Quorum of the Twelve Apostles, and Lynn A. Mickelsen, of the Seventy and president of the Mexico North Area, accompanied Monson. Members from across the temple district traveled hours by bus to attend the dedication. For many members who had previously been unable to access temple ordinances due to the distance and difficulty of travel, the temple in Tampico made this worship accessible for the first time for those members.

The dedication of the Tampico Mexico Temple occurred one day before the dedications of the Villahermosa Mexico and the Nashville Tennessee temples, the first time three temples were dedicated during the same weekend. Monson participated in a cornerstone ceremony, humorously warning attendees that his efforts with trowel and mortar would be the work of an amateur.

== Design and architecture ==
The Tampico Mexico Temple uses a classic modern design style. Designed by architect Alvaro Inigo in collaboration with church personnel, the temple was constructed by PyCSA and Okland Construction Company, with Rodolfo Avalos being the project manager.

The temple is on a 3.73-acre plot that includes an adjoining meetinghouse. The site is located in Ciudad Madero, approximately five miles west of the Gulf of Mexico. The property's elevated position on the former "Rabbit Hill" allows the temple to be visible throughout the surrounding area.

The single-story structure is 77 feet by 149 feet and is 10,700 square feet. The exterior has Blanco Guardiano white marble quarried from Torreón, Mexico. The temple has a central spire topped with a statue of the angel Moroni.

The temple has two ordinance rooms, two sealing rooms, and a baptistry.

== Temple leadership and admittance ==
The church's temples are directed by a temple president and matron, each typically serving for a term of three years. The president and matron oversee the administration of temple operations and provide guidance and training for both temple patrons and staff. Gabriel R. Saldivar Flores was the first president, with Maria Luisa Balboa de Saldivar serving as matron. As of 2025, Victor Esparza Villasana is the president, with Angelina Ramon de Esparza serving as matron.

=== Admittance ===
After construction was complete, the church announced the public open house that was held from April 29 to May 6, 2000. Like all the church's temples, it is not used for Sunday worship services. To members of the church, temples are regarded as sacred houses of the Lord. Once dedicated, only church members with a current temple recommend can enter for worship.

== See also ==
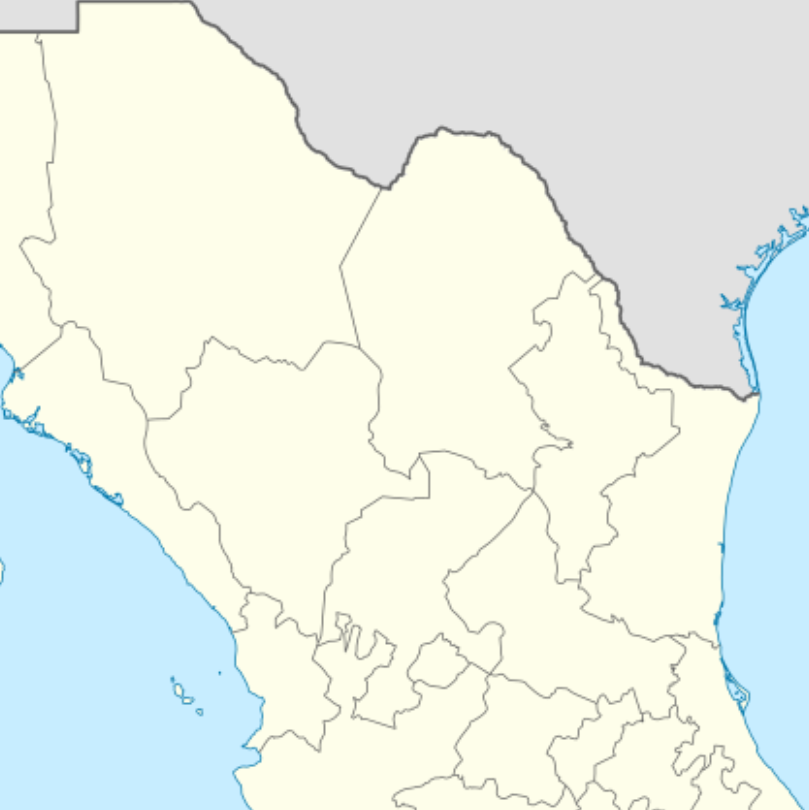

Temples in Northeastern Mexico

Northwest Mexico Temples
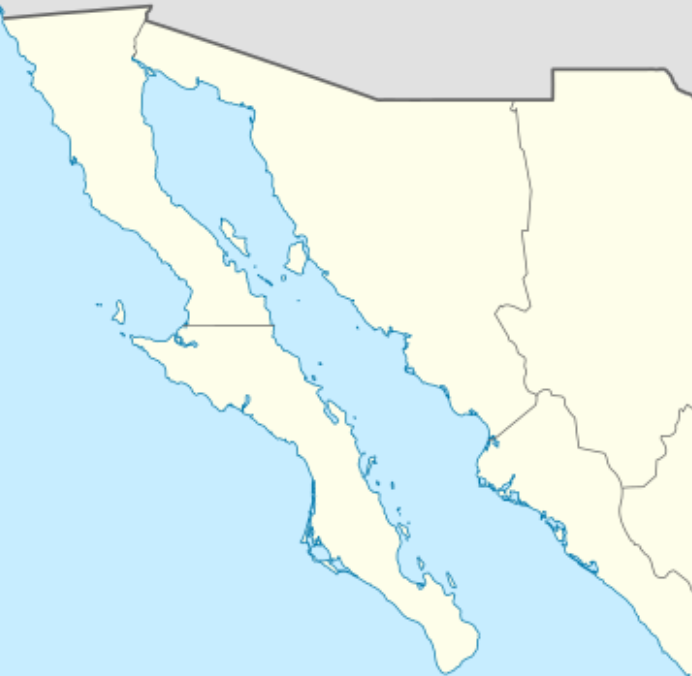
Temples in Northwestern Mexico
Central Mexico Temples
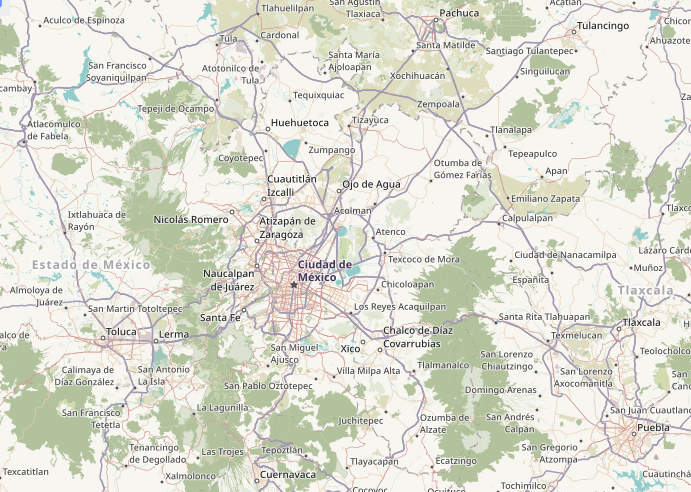
Temples in Central Mexico
Southeast Mexico Temples
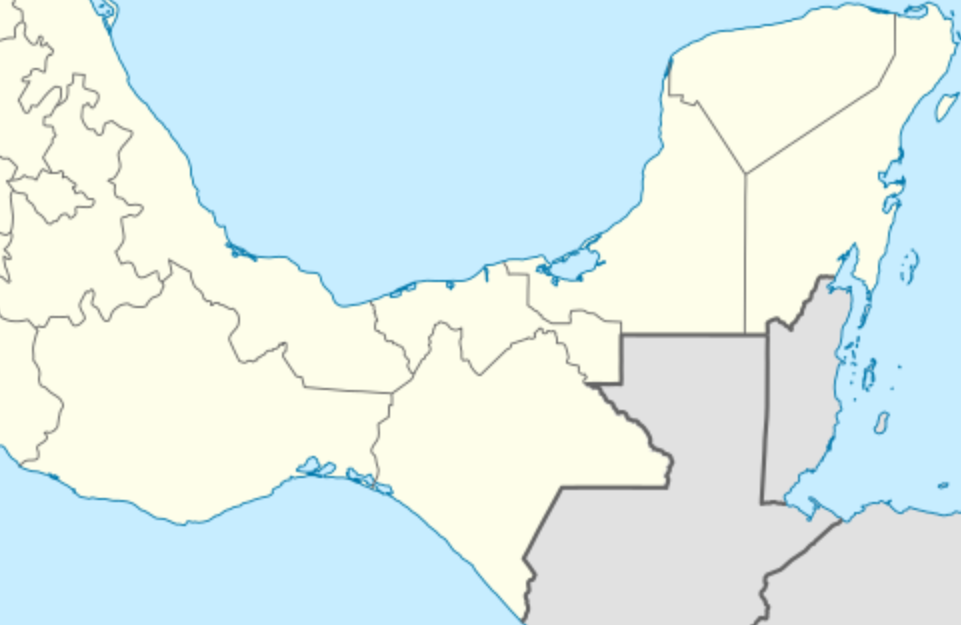
Temples in Southeast Mexico
Mexico Map
Temples in Mexico

= Operating
= Under construction
= Announced
= Temporarily Closed

- Comparison of temples of The Church of Jesus Christ of Latter-day Saints
- List of temples of The Church of Jesus Christ of Latter-day Saints
- List of temples of The Church of Jesus Christ of Latter-day Saints by geographic region
- Temple architecture (Latter-day Saints)
- The Church of Jesus Christ of Latter-day Saints in Mexico

== Additional reading ==
- "Dates announced for dedications, open houses of Mexico temples", Church News, Jan 22, 2000
- "Temple dates announced, postponed", Church News, March 11, 2000
- "Facts and figures: Tampico Mexico Temple", Church News, May 27, 2000
- Swensen, Jason (May 27, 2000), "Sacred hill now site of Tampico temple", Church News
