= Villahermosa Mexico Temple =

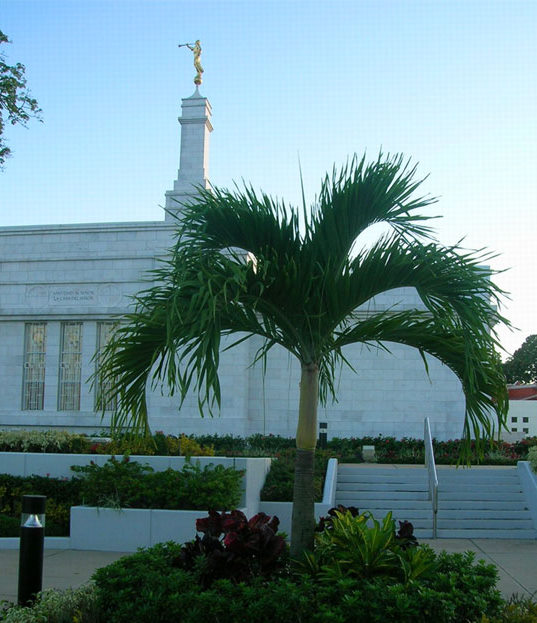
- Interactive map of Villahermosa Mexico Temple
- Number: 85
- Dedication: 21 May 2000, by Thomas S. Monson
- Site: 1.36 acres (0.55 ha)
- Floor area: 10,700 ft^{2} (990 m^{2})
- Height: 71 ft (22 m)
- Official website • News & images

Church chronology
← Nashville Tennessee Temple	Villahermosa Mexico Temple	→ Montreal Quebec Temple

Additional information
- Announced: 30 October 1998, by Gordon B. Hinckley
- Groundbreaking: 9 January 1999, by Richard E. Turley Sr.
- Open house: 9–13 May 2000
- Current president: Fernando Chiu Jiménez
- Designed by: Alvaro Inigo and Church A&E Services
- Location: Villahermosa, Mexico
- Coordinates: 17°58′52.59360″N 92°56′14.55000″W
- Exterior finish: Blanco Guardiano white marble from Torreón, Mexico
- Design: Classic modern, single-spire design
- Baptistries: 1
- Ordinance rooms: 2 (two-stage progressive)
- Sealing rooms: 2

The Villahermosa Mexico Temple is the 85th operating temple of the Church of Jesus Christ of Latter-day Saints. It is located in Villahermosa, Tabasco and is the eighth temple in Mexico. The intent to build the temple was announced on October 30, 1998, by the First Presidency in a letter to local church leaders. The temple has a single spire, with a statue of the angel Moroni on its top and uses a classic modern architectural style designed by Alvaro Inigo and church architectural personnel. The exterior is Blanco Guardiano white marble from Torreón, Mexico.

A groundbreaking ceremony was held on January 9, 1999, conducted by Richard E. Turley, Sr., a church general authority and first counselor in the Mexico South Area. The temple was dedicated on May 21, 2000, by Thomas S. Monson, first counselor in the First Presidency. For the first time, three temples were dedicated during one weekend. The site is located near the Isthmus of Tehuantepec on Mexico's Gulf Coast and has an ancient ceiba tree near the temple entrance, a tree considered sacred by the ancient Maya civilization that once inhabited the region.

== History ==
The Villahermosa Mexico Temple was announced on October 30, 1998, by the First Presidency in a letter sent to local church leaders. The site is in a region near the coast of Mexico's isthmus in a Mesoamerican area where ancient ruins are found. The area is often referred to as a potential Book of Mormon land, where many believe ancient temples existed. At the time of the temple's construction, there were approximately 23,000 church members in the area.

The groundbreaking ceremony took place on January 9, 1999, with Richard E. Turley Sr., of the Seventy and first counselor in the Mexico South Area, presiding. During the groundbreaking, Turley spoke of his uncle, Harold E. Turley, who served years earlier as a regional representative, and along with his wife, Ireta, lived in a trailer on the site where the temple would be constructed. The Turleys developed deep affection for the people of the area. About 200 people attended the groundbreaking ceremony, consisting mostly of local leaders and their families. The event was not widely announced due to space limitations. That groundbreaking ceremony was held the same day as the one for the Ciudad Juárez Mexico Temple.

Following completion of construction, the church announced the public open house that was held from May 9 to May 13, 2000, where approximately 10,164 people visited the temple. A local member stated that many nonmembers attended the open house and subsequently requested to hear the missionary discussions.

Thomas S. Monson, first counselor in the First Presidency, dedicated the temple on May 21, 2000. Four dedicatory sessions were held, with 3,853 church members in attendance. L. Tom Perry, of the Quorum of the Twelve Apostles, accompanied Monson. The dedication was one day after Monson dedicated the Tampico Mexico Temple. With the Nashville Tennessee Temple also dedicated that weekend, it the first time in church history that three were dedicated during the same weekend. It was the fifth temple dedicated by Monson.

At the dedication, Samuel Oteo, identified as a pioneers of the church in Tabasco, stated that he had prayed often for a temple in that part of Mexico. Monson appeared moved by the enthusiasm and love demonstrated by local members and commented on the beauty of the Tabasco children, stating that they were "children of Lehi."

== Design and architecture ==
The Villahermosa Mexico Temple was designed by Alvaro Inigo and church architectural personnel, using a classic modern design style. Construction project managers were John Webster and Dean Fife, with PyCSA and Okland Construction Company as contractors.

The temple is on a 1.73-acre plot in the center of Villahermosa at Avenida 27 de Febrero #1802, Colonia Atasta de Serra. It is located near the coast of Mexico's isthmus on the Isthmus of Tehuantepec, near the Gulf of Mexico coast. In 2010, the temple district served from eight stakes and two districts in Tabasco, an area on the east coast before the Yucatan Peninsula.

The grounds have an ancient ceiba tree located near the temple entrance. The ceiba tree has cultural importance, as the ancient Maya who inhabited the land in southeast Mexico regarded it as sacred. According to Mayan legend, the tropical tree taught a lesson about remaining deeply rooted in the goodness of the rich Mexican soil while simultaneously reaching upward toward heaven. In the state of Tabasco, it is illegal to cut down a ceiba tree.

The structure is 77 feet by 149 feet and has a single spire with aangel Moroni statue on top. The exterior is Blanco Guardiano white marble from Torreón, Mexico. The total floor area of the temple is 10,700 square feet.

The temple has a baptistry, two instruction rooms, and two sealing rooms.

== Temple leadership and admittance ==
The church's temples are directed by a temple president and matron, each typically serving for a term of three years. The president and matron oversee the administration of temple operations and provide guidance and training for both temple patrons and staff. Serving from 2000 to 2003, F. Rufino Rodriguez was the first president, with Violeta Rodriguez serving as matron. As of 2024, José Fernando Chiu Jiménez is the president, with Maria del Carmen Pola Contreras de Chiu serving as matron.

=== Admittance ===
Following completion of construction, a public open house was held from May 9 to May 13, 2000. Like all the church's temples, it is not used for Sunday worship services. To members of the church, temples are regarded as sacred houses of the Lord. Once dedicated, only church members with a current temple recommend can enter for worship.

== See also ==
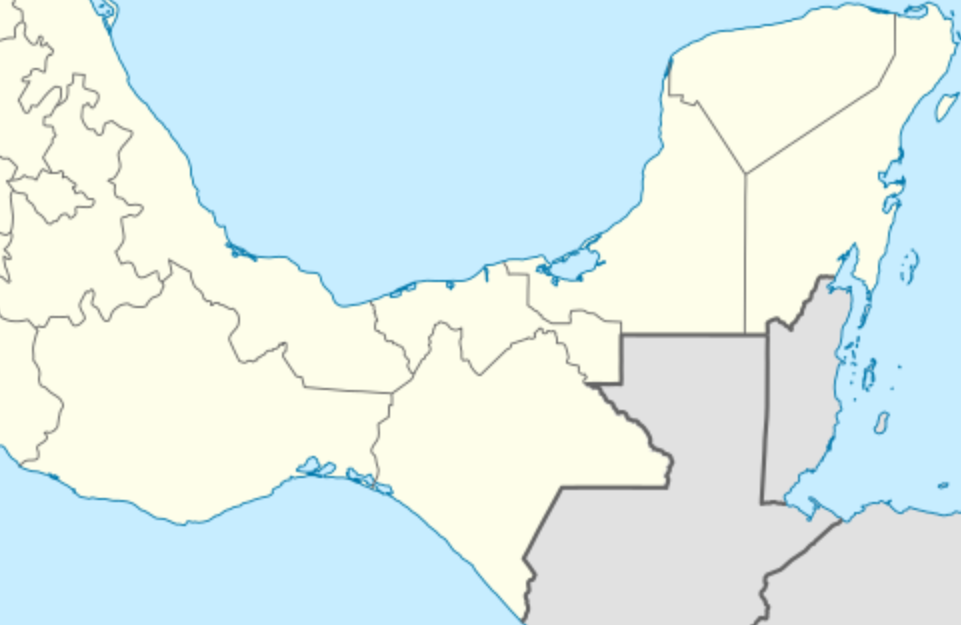

Temples in Southeast Mexico

Northwestern Mexico Temples
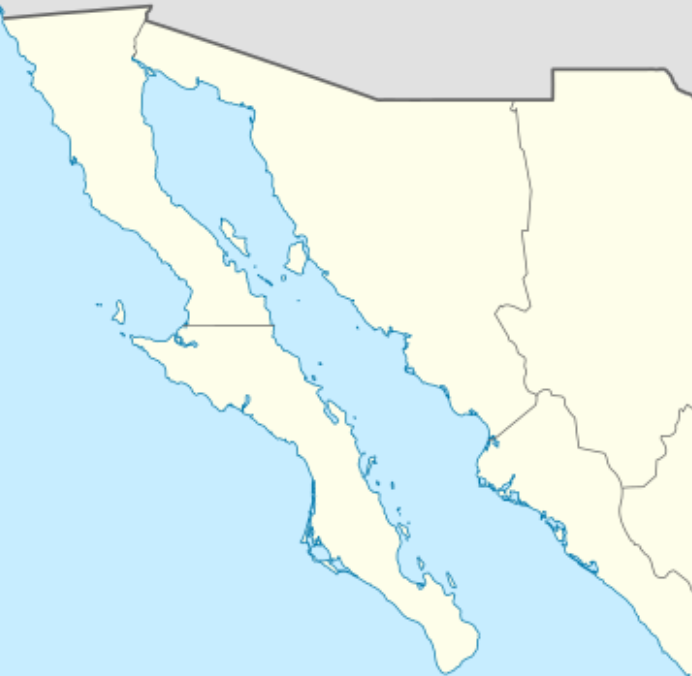
Temples in Northwestern Mexico
Northeastern Mexico Temples
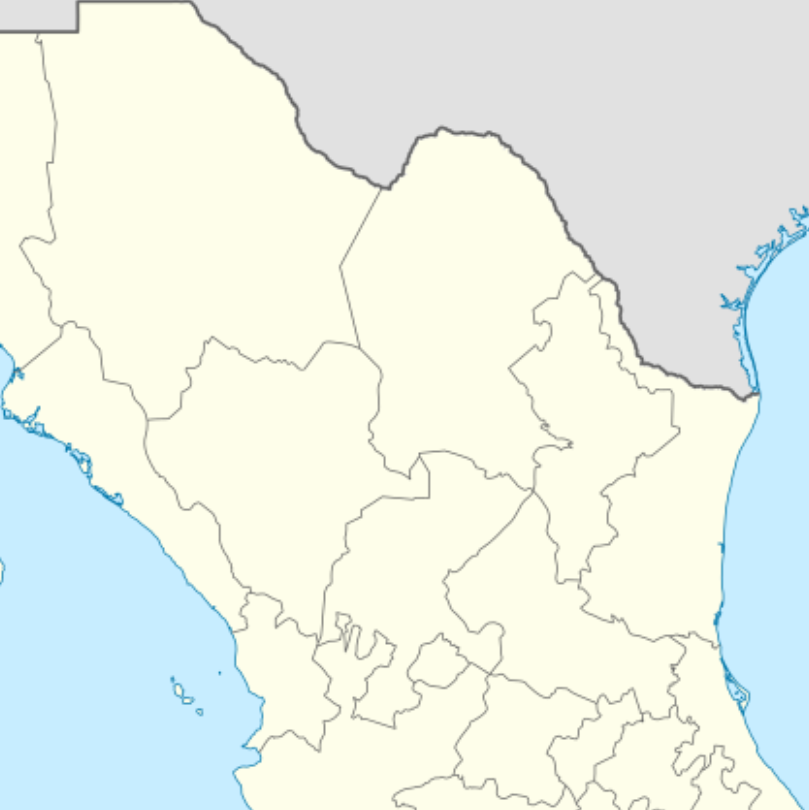
Temples in Northeastern Mexico
Central Mexico Temples
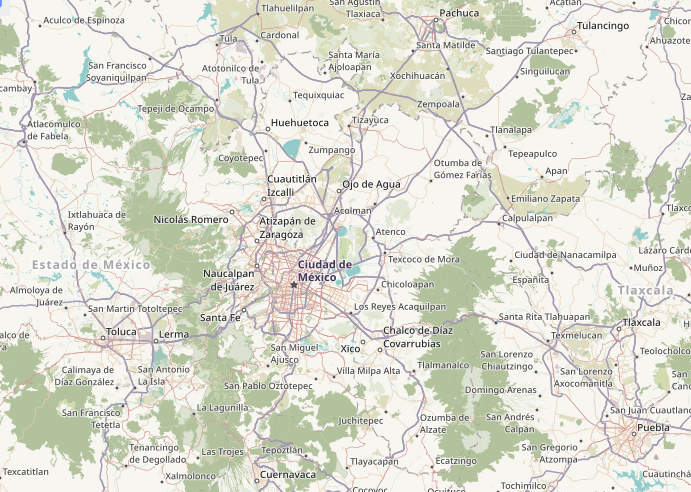
Temples in Central Mexico
Mexico Map
Temples in Mexico

= Operating
= Under construction
= Announced
= Temporarily Closed

- Comparison of temples of The Church of Jesus Christ of Latter-day Saints
- List of temples (LDS Church)
- List of temples of The Church of Jesus Christ of Latter-day Saints by geographic region
- Temple architecture (Latter-day Saints)
- The Church of Jesus Christ of Latter-day Saints in Mexico

== Additional reading ==
- Swensen, Jason (May 27, 2000), "Villahermosa temple stands like ceiba tree", Church News
