= Nashville Tennessee Temple =

Temple of the LDS church

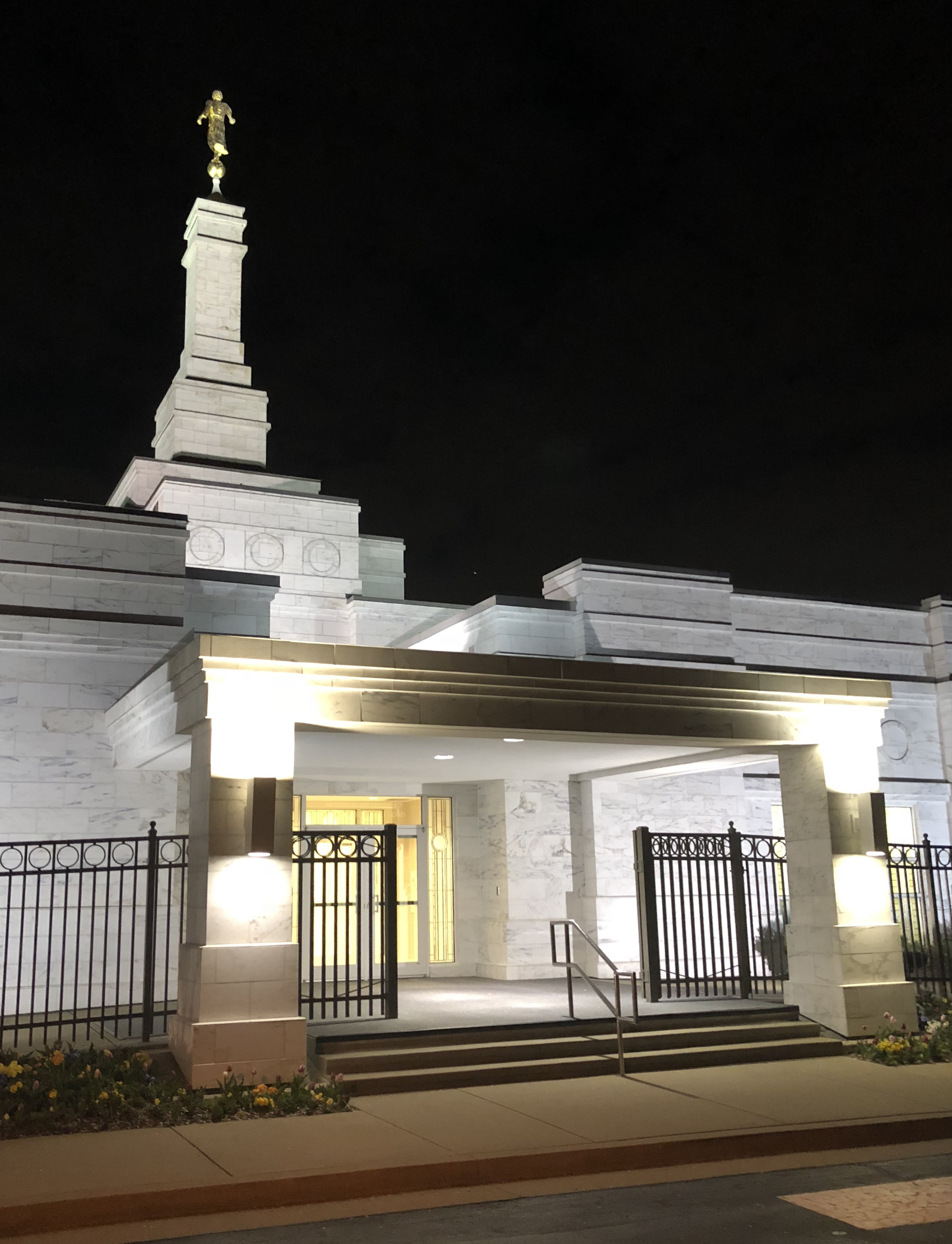
- Interactive map of Nashville Tennessee Temple
- Number: 84
- Dedication: May 21, 2000, by James E. Faust
- Site: 6.86 acres (2.78 ha)
- Floor area: 10,700 ft^{2} (990 m^{2})
- Height: 71 ft (22 m)
- Official website • News & images

Church chronology
← Tampico Mexico Temple	Nashville Tennessee Temple	→ Villahermosa Mexico Temple

Additional information
- Announced: November 9, 1994, by Howard W. Hunter
- Groundbreaking: March 13, 1999, by John K. Carmack
- Open house: May 6–13, 2000
- Current president: Robert Davis Dennis
- Designed by: Robert Waldrip and Church A&E Services
- Location: Franklin, Tennessee, United States
- Coordinates: 35°56′55.82039″N 86°51′37.18439″W
- Exterior finish: Imperial Danby white marble
- Design: Classic modern, single-spire design
- Baptistries: 1
- Ordinance rooms: 2 (two-stage progressive)
- Sealing rooms: 2

The Nashville Tennessee Temple is the 84th operating temple of the Church of Jesus Christ of Latter-day Saints, and is located in Franklin, Tennessee, United States, approximately 20 miles (32 km) southwest of central Nashville. The intent to build the temple, the first in Tennessee, was announced August 7, 1994, by church president Gordon B. Hinckley. The temple has a single spire with a statue of the angel Moroni at its top, and is built from Imperial Danby white marble, using a simplified, contemporary temple design. The temple is on a 4.98-acre site adjacent to an existing meetinghouse.

A groundbreaking ceremony, to signify beginning of construction, was held on March 13, 1999, with John K. Carmack, a church general authority, presiding. The temple was later dedicated by James E. Faust on May 21, 2000, in four sessions. Over 24,000 people toured the building during a public open house held earlier that month. The interior has two ordinance rooms and two sealing rooms, arranged to support the church's ordinances.

== History ==
The intent to build the Nashville Tennessee Temple was announced November 12, 1994. It was originally to be built in the affluent suburb of Forest Hills, but the plan was turned down by city commissioners due to zoning rules. At the time of its completion, the temple served church members in central and eastern Tennessee and western Kentucky.

On May 11, 1999, the church announced that the temple would be constructed on a 4.98-acre (2.02 ha) property located adjacent to an existing meetinghouse in Franklin, Tennessee, approximately 20 miles south of downtown Nashville. The preliminary plans called for a single-story structure of more than 10,000 square feet.

A groundbreaking ceremony took place on March 13, 1999, marking the commencement of construction. This ceremony was presided over by John K. Carmack, president of the church’s North America Southeast Area, and attended by local church members and community leaders.

Following completion of construction, a public open house was held from May 6–13, 2000. According to the church, more than 24,000 people toured the temple during the open house.

The Nashville Tennessee Temple was dedicated on May 21, 2000 by James E. Faust, then second counselor in the church's First Presidency.

== Design and architecture ==
The building has a contemporary adaptation of classical design elements, coupled with a traditional Latter-day Saint temple layout. Designed by the church’s in-house architectural team, and Robert Waldrip, its architecture reflects both the cultural heritage of the American South and its spiritual significance to the church.

The temple is on a 6.86-acre plot, and the surrounding landscaping includes lawns, trees, and carefully curated garden beds

The structure is one story, has a total floor area of 10,700 square feet (990 m^{2}), and is constructed with Imperial Danby white marble quarried in Vermont. The exterior has a single spire topped with a statue of the angel Moroni, symbolizing the restoration of the gospel and the call to gather Israel. The temple's design emphasizes simplicity and reverence.

The interior uses simple design choices, centered around the ordinance and sealing rooms, designed to create a spiritually uplifting environment. The temple includes two ordinance rooms and two sealing rooms.

The design has elements representing the purity and holiness of the temple. Symbolism is important to church members and includes the white marble to represent purity, the spire pointing heavenward, and the angel Moroni as a herald of the Second Coming.

== Temple presidents ==
The church's temples are directed by a temple president and matron, each typically serving for a term of three years. The president and matron oversee the administration of temple operations and provide guidance and training for both temple patrons and staff.

Serving from 2000 to 2004, Buryl G. McClurg was its first president, with Diane W. McClurg serving as matron. As of 2025, Robert D. Dennis is the president, with Holly C. Dennis serving as matron.

== Admittance ==
A public open house was held from May 6 to May 13, 2000 (excluding Sunday). The temple was dedicated by James E. Faust on May 21, 2000.

Like all the church's temples, it is not used for Sunday worship services. To members of the church, temples are regarded as sacred houses of the Lord. Once dedicated, only church members with a current temple recommend can enter for worship.

== See also ==
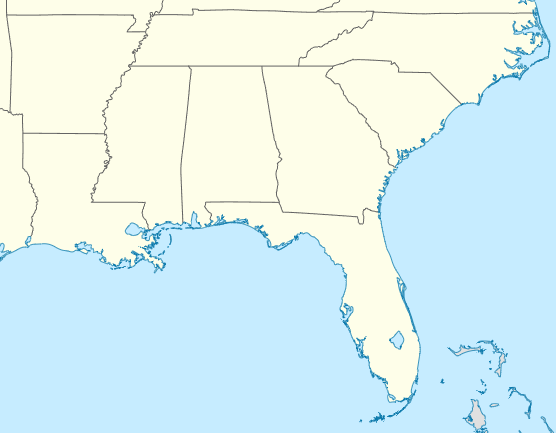
Temples in the Southeastern United States
- = Operating
- = Under construction
- = Announced
- = Temporarily Closed
- Comparison of temples of The Church of Jesus Christ of Latter-day Saints
- List of temples of The Church of Jesus Christ of Latter-day Saints
- List of temples of The Church of Jesus Christ of Latter-day Saints by geographic region
- Temple architecture (Latter-day Saints)
- The Church of Jesus Christ of Latter-day Saints in Tennessee
