= Reno Nevada Temple =

Latter-day Saint Temple in Nevada

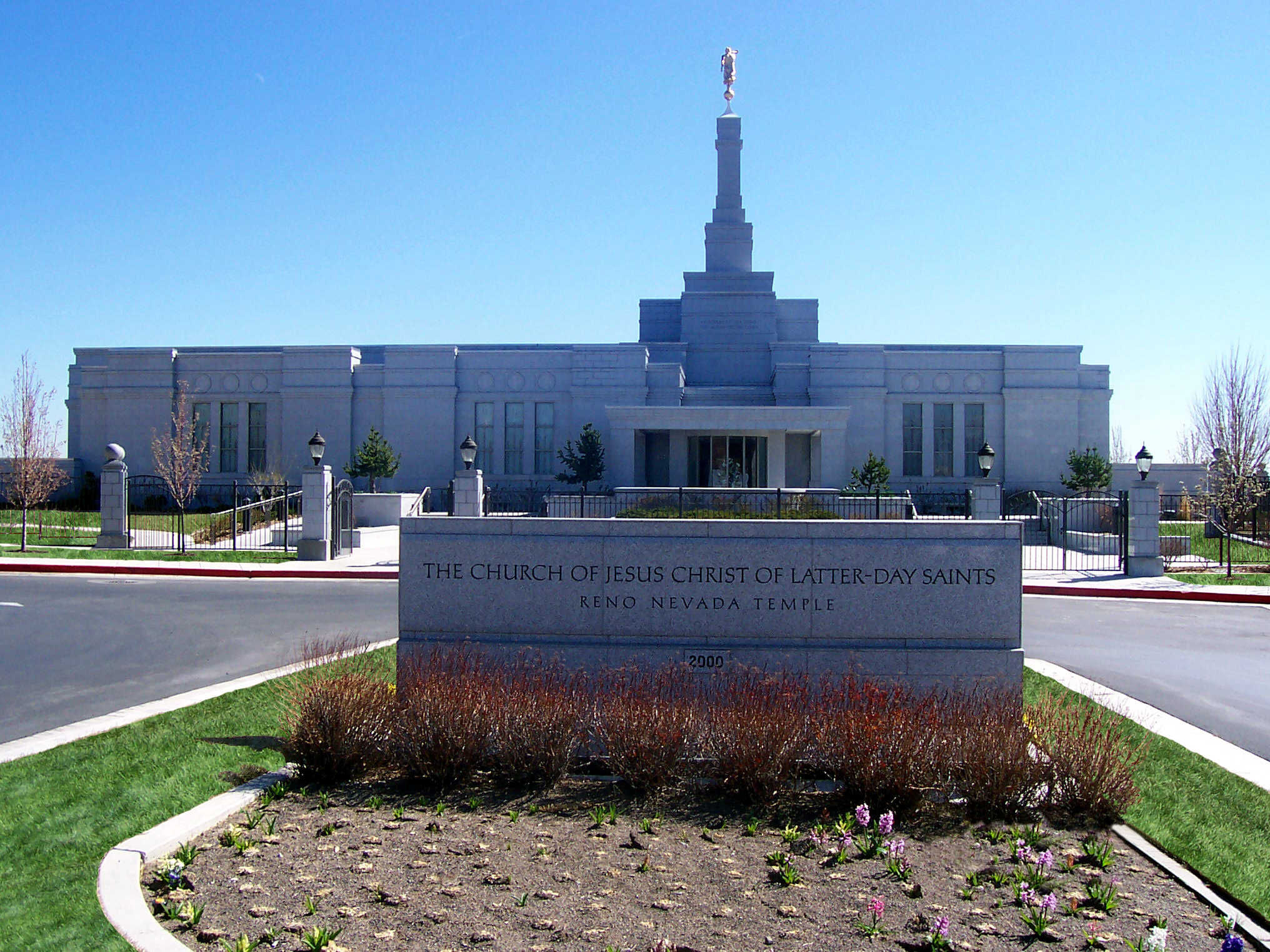
- Interactive map of Reno Nevada Temple
- Number: 81
- Dedication: April 23, 2000, by Thomas S. Monson
- Site: 7.9 acres (3.2 ha)
- Floor area: 10,700 ft^{2} (990 m^{2})
- Height: 71 ft (22 m)
- Official website • News & images

Church chronology
← Memphis Tennessee Temple	Reno Nevada Temple	→ Cochabamba Bolivia Temple

Additional information
- Announced: April 12, 1999, by Gordon B. Hinckley
- Groundbreaking: July 24, 1999, by Rex D. Pinegar
- Open house: April 8–15, 2000
- Current president: David Asa Haws
- Designed by: Church A&E Services
- Location: Reno, Nevada, United States
- Coordinates: 39°32′4.6″N 119°53′56.1″W
- Exterior finish: Gray granite quarried near Sharon, Vermont
- Design: Classic modern, single-spire design
- Baptistries: 1
- Ordinance rooms: 2 (two-stage progressive)
- Sealing rooms: 2
- Notes: Second temple built in Nevada, following Las Vegas Temple.

The Reno Nevada Temple is the 81st operating temple of the Church of Jesus Christ of Latter-day Saints, and is located in Reno, Nevada. The intent to build the temple was announced by the church's First Presidency on April 12, 1999. It is the second in Nevada, following the Las Vegas Nevada Temple, which was dedicated in 1989.

The temple has a single spire with a gold-leafed statue of the angel Moroni on its top. It was designed by Jacobsen Construction and the church's temple construction department. A groundbreaking ceremony, to signify beginning of construction, was held on July 24, 1999, with Rex D. Pinegar, a general authority and president of the church’s North America Southwest Area presiding.

== History ==
On April 12, 1999, the First Presidency announced plans to construct the Reno Nevada Temple. It was planned for a 1.2-acre site at 2000 Beaumont Parkway in northwest Reno. Early designs called for a single-story structure of approximately 10,700 square feet.

A groundbreaking ceremony was held on July 24, 1999, coinciding with Pioneer Day celebrations, with Rex D. Pinegar presiding. The ceremony was attended by local church members and civic leaders.

After construction was completed, a public open house was held from April 8 to April 15, 2000, with more than 28,000 people touring the temple. The temple was dedicated in four sessions on April 23, 2000, by Thomas S. Monson, first counselor in the First Presidency, and attended by 7,774 church members.

At the time of its dedication, the temple served approximately 25,00 Latter-day Saints in eight stakes across western Nevada and eastern California.

In 2020, like all others in the church, the Reno Nevada Temple was closed for a time in response to the COVID-19 pandemic.

== Design and architecture ==
The Reno Nevada Temple blends modern architecture and traditional Latter-day Saint temple design.

The temple is on a 1.2-acre plot at 2000 Beaumont Parkway in northwest Reno. It is on an elevated location near a steep hillside, offering views of downtown Reno and the Truckee Meadows. The grounds are enclosed by a black iron fence, with landscaping that includes lawns and selected vegetation.

The temple is a single-story structure constructed with gray granite quarried near Sharon, Vermont, the birthplace of church founder Joseph Smith. The structure measures approximately 149 feet by 77 feet. The building has a single spire that includes a statue of the angel Moroni on top, symbolizing the restoration of the gospel of Jesus Christ.

The building is 10,700 square feet, and has two ordinance rooms and two sealing rooms. The interior includes white walls, gold trim, crystal chandeliers, and large mirrors.

== Cultural and community impact ==
Since its dedication in 2000, the Reno Nevada Temple has served over 25,000 church members in western Nevada and northeastern California.

Its construction reduced the need for long-distance travel to neighboring states—particularly the Oakland California Temple—which previously served most northern Nevada members.

In April 2025, the church held a 25th anniversary celebration at a local meetinghouse in conjunction with the temple milestone. The event featured presentations on the temple's history, family history workshops, and community gatherings, highlighting the church’s ongoing commitment to heritage, intergenerational connection, and local engagement.

== Temple presidents ==
The church's temples are directed by a temple president and matron, each typically serving for a term of three years. The president and matron oversee the administration of temple operations and provide guidance and training for both temple patrons and staff.

Serving from 2000 to 2004, W. Darrell Foote was the first president, with Barbara A. Foote serving as matron. As of 2025, Ren S. Johnson is the president, with Kelly J. Johnson serving as matron.

== Admittance ==
On March 25, 2000, the Church announced the public open house that was held for the Reno Nevada Temple from April 8 to April 15, 2000, excluding Sunday. The temple was dedicated by Thomas S. Monson on April 23, 2000, in four sessions.

Like all the church's temples, it is not used for Sunday worship services. To members of the church, temples are regarded as sacred houses of the Lord. Once dedicated, only church members with a current temple recommend can enter for worship.

== See also ==

Temples in Nevada

- = Operating
- = Under construction
- = Announced
- = Temporarily Closed

- Comparison of temples of The Church of Jesus Christ of Latter-day Saints
- List of temples of The Church of Jesus Christ of Latter-day Saints
- List of temples of The Church of Jesus Christ of Latter-day Saints by geographic region
- Temple architecture (Latter-day Saints)
- The Church of Jesus Christ of Latter-day Saints in Nevada

== Additional reading ==
- "New temples announced for Mexico, Nevada", Church News, April 17, 1999
- "Ground is broken for Reno temple", Church News, July 31, 1999
- "Dedication dates set for Reno and Cochabamba temples", Church News, March 25, 2000
- Dockstader, Julie (April 29, 2000), "Reno temple: Easter Day dedication brings hope", Church News
- "Facts and figures: Reno Nevada Temple", Church News, April 29, 2000
