= Las Vegas Nevada Temple =

Latter-day Saint Temple in Nevada

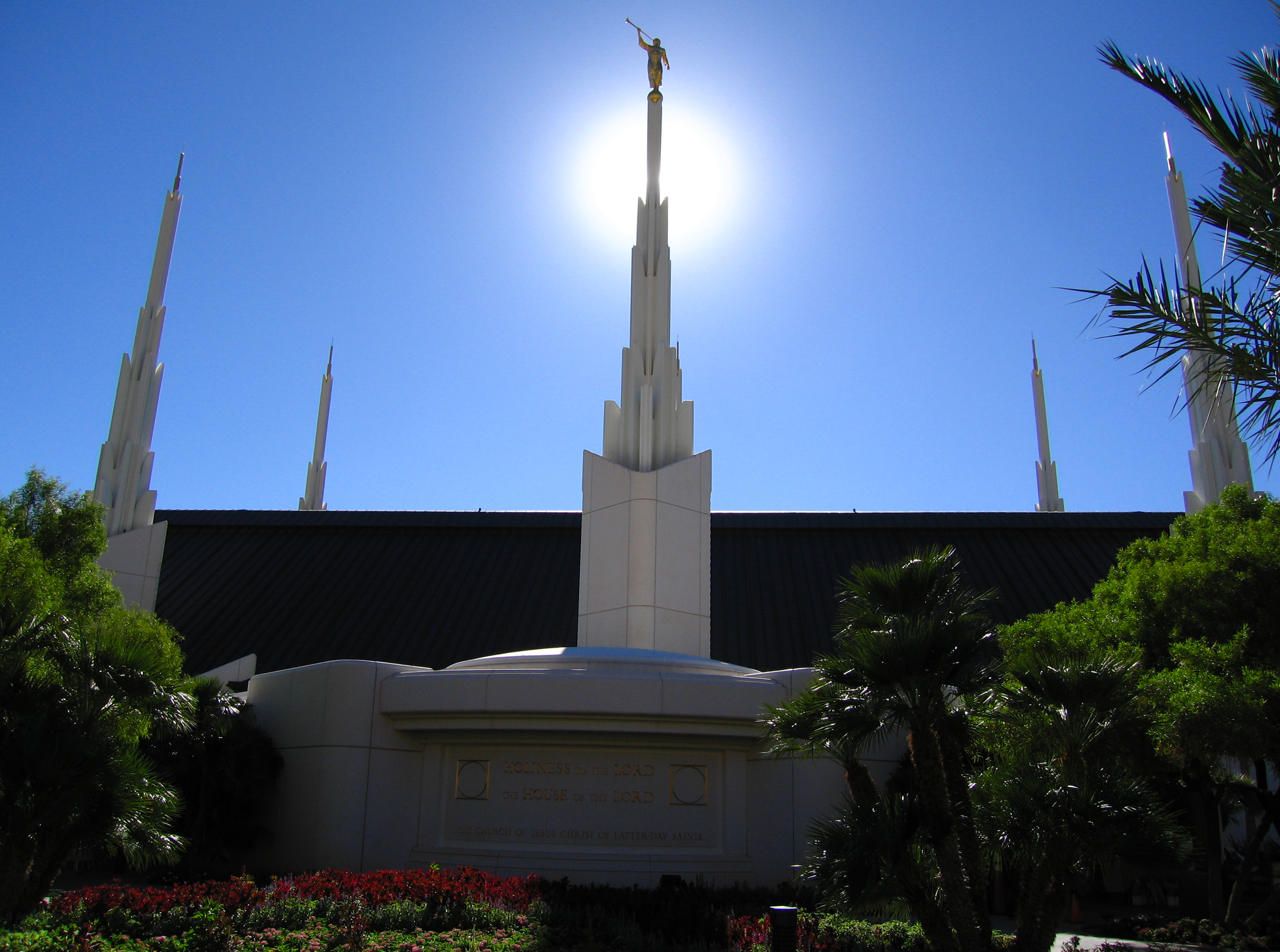
- Interactive map of Las Vegas Nevada Temple
- Number: 43
- Dedication: December 16, 1989, by Gordon B. Hinckley
- Site: 10.3 acres (4.2 ha)
- Floor area: 80,350 ft^{2} (7,465 m^{2})
- Height: 137 ft (42 m)
- Official website • News & images

Church chronology
← Portland Oregon Temple	Las Vegas Nevada Temple	→ Toronto Ontario Temple

Additional information
- Announced: April 7, 1984, by Spencer W. Kimball
- Groundbreaking: November 30, 1985, by Gordon B. Hinckley
- Open house: November 16 – December 9, 1989
- Designed by: Tate & Snyder Architects
- Location: Sunrise Manor, Nevada, United States
- Coordinates: 36°10′28.5″N 115°1′12.2″W
- Exterior finish: White precast stone walls and copper roof and detailing
- Design: Modern, six-spire design
- Baptistries: 1
- Ordinance rooms: 4 (stationary)
- Sealing rooms: 6
- Clothing rental: Available

The Las Vegas Nevada Temple is the 43rd operating temple of the Church of Jesus Christ of Latter-day Saints (LDS Church). The temple was announced in April 1984.

The temple has six spires, one of which is topped by an angel Moroni statue. This temple was designed by Tate & Snyder. A groundbreaking ceremony, to signify the beginning of construction, was held on November 30, 1985, conducted by Gordon B. Hinckley. Reflecting the Church's dedication to sacred spaces, the Las Vegas Nevada Temple reflects its deep-rooted commitment to spiritual practices and community enrichment.

== History ==
The temple was announced by Hinckley on April 7, 1984. The site for the temple was selected due to its significance to the church and the local community.

Located in the Sunrise Manor CDP near Las Vegas, Nevada, the temple sits on 10.3 acres (4.2 ha) of land at the base of Frenchman Mountain. A groundbreaking ceremony and site dedication for the temple were held in November 1985. Gordon B. Hinckley, then a counselor in the church's First Presidency, presided and gave the dedication prayer. Construction began soon after the ceremony.

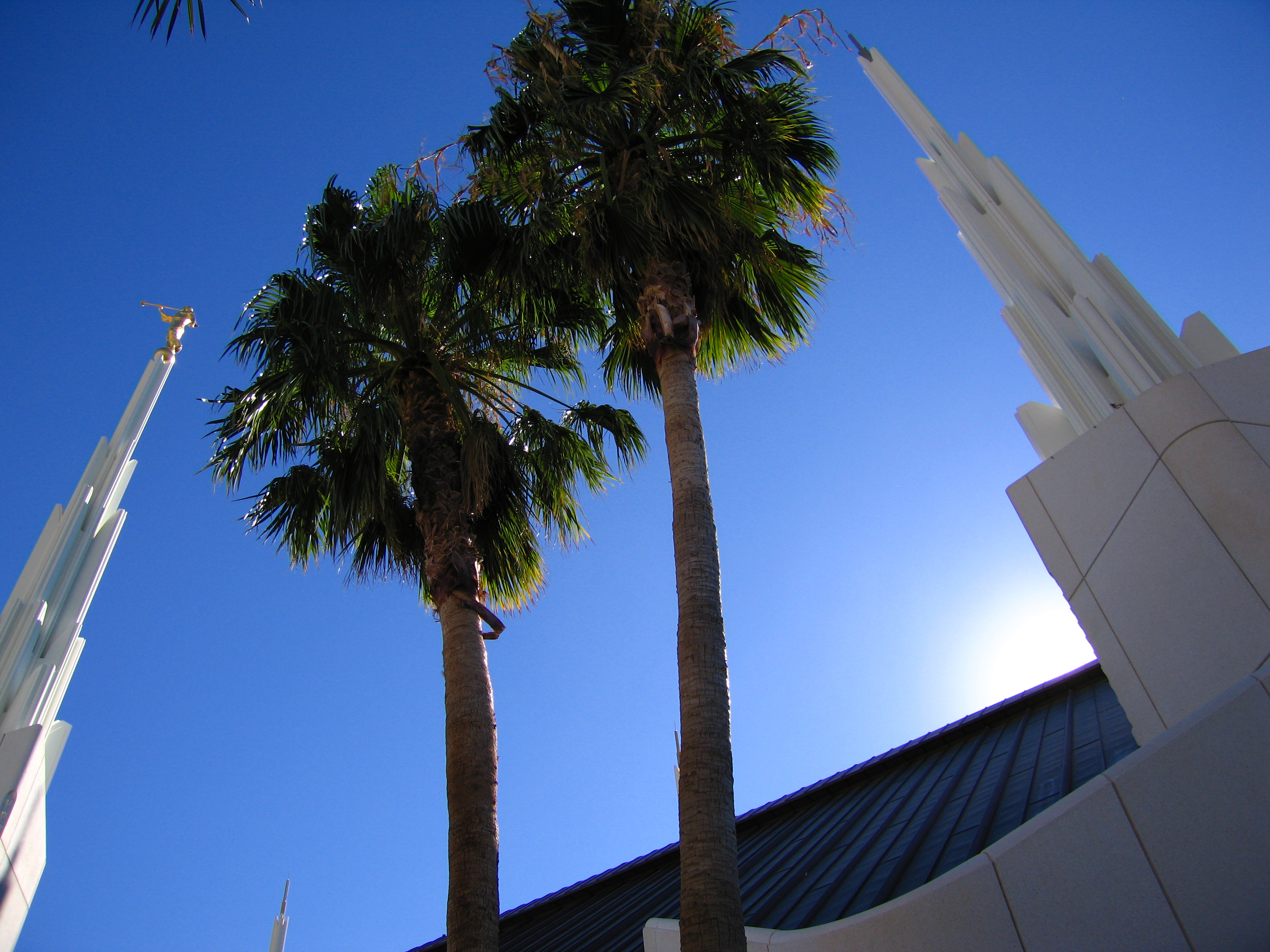
Spires of the Las Vegas Temple

After construction was completed, the temple was open to the public for tours between November 16 and December 9, 1989. Almost 300,000 people toured the temple and its grounds during these three weeks. The temple has six spires, the highest of which is 119 feet (36 m). At the top of this tower stands a ten-foot statue of the angel Moroni. The exterior is a white finish of pre-cast stone walls with a copper roof. The temple has 192 rooms, which includes four ordinance rooms, a celestial room, six sealing rooms, a baptismal font, and other facilities to meet the needs of the temple. The temple serves church members in the southern part of Nevada and surrounding areas in California and Arizona.

Hinckley dedicated the temple in eleven sessions held from December 16–18, 1989, with more than 30,000 Latter-day Saints attending. The temple was dedicated as "an oasis of peace and light."

In 2020, like all those in the church, the Las Vegas Nevada Temple was closed in response to the COVID-19 pandemic.

Throughout its history, the Las Vegas Nevada Temple has served as a center of spiritual growth, playing a vital role in the lives of church members in the region.

== Design and architecture ==
The building has a traditional Latter-day Saint temple design which was inspired by the desert landscapes of Nevada. Designed by architectural firm Tate & Snyder, the temple's architecture reflects the heritage of the Las Vegas area and the spiritual significance to the church.

=== Site ===
The temple sits on a 10.3-acre plot, and the landscaping around the temple features pathways, flowers, and trees. These elements are designed to provide a tranquil setting that enhances the sacred atmosphere of the site.

=== Exterior ===
The structure stands 137 feet tall at its highest spire, constructed with precast white stone. The exterior is characterized by a copper roof, six spires, and a statue of the angel Moroni.

=== Interior ===
The interior features tones of dusty rose, rust, and sand, centered around the celestial room, which is designed to create a spiritually uplifting environment. The celestial room has two large chandeliers, and specially cut windows which cast rainbows onto the walls of the room. In addition to the celestial room, the temple has four ordinance rooms, six sealing rooms, and a baptistry, each designed for ceremonial use.

=== Symbols ===
The design has elements representing Latter-day Saint symbolism to provide spiritual meaning to the temple's appearance and function. Symbolism is an important subject to church members, including the celestial room as one of the more important, and which is intended to represent heaven.

== Temple presidents ==
The church's temples are directed by a temple president and matron, each serving for a term of three years. The president and matron oversee the administration of temple operations and provide guidance and training for both temple patrons and staff. The first president of the Las Vegas Temple was Boyad M. Tanner, with the matron being Bette M. Tanner. They served from 1989 to 1992. As of 2024, William H. Stoddard is the president, with Carol E. Stoddard serving as matron.

== Admittance ==
Following the completion of the temple, an open house was held from November 16-December 9, 1989. During the open house, nearly 300,000 people toured the temple. The temple was dedicated by Gordon B. Hinckley in 11 sessions from December 16-18, 1989. Like all the church's temples, it is not used for Sunday worship services. To members of the church, temples are regarded as sacred houses of the Lord. Once dedicated, only church members with a current temple recommend can enter for worship.

== See also ==

Temples in Nevada

- = Operating
- = Under construction
- = Announced
- = Temporarily Closed

- Comparison of temples (LDS Church)
- Temple (LDS Church)
- List of temples by geographic region (LDS Church)
- Temple architecture (LDS Church)
- The Church of Jesus Christ of Latter-day Saints in Nevada
