= Draper station (FrontRunner) =

Commuter rail station in Draper, Utah, US

Draper
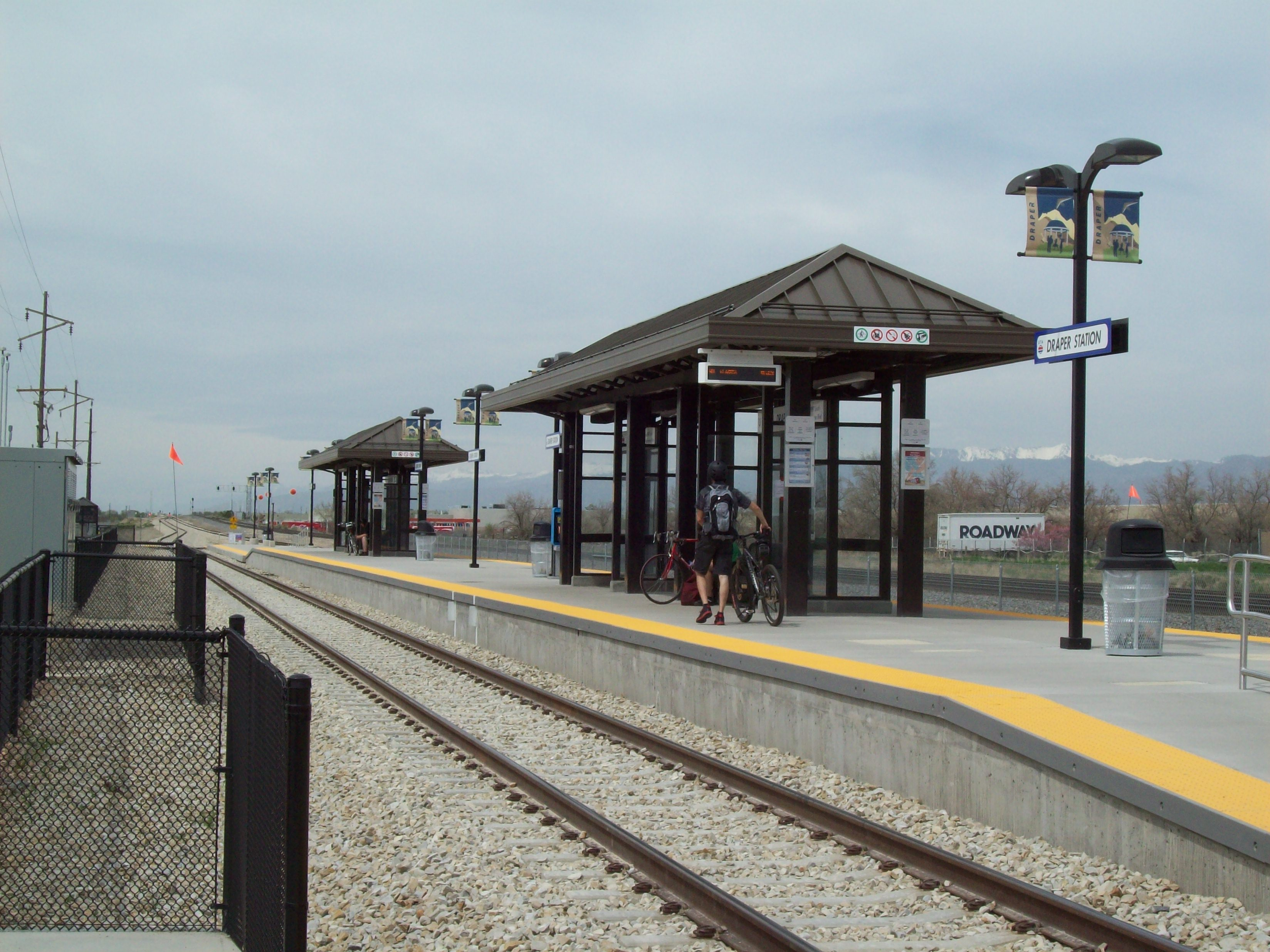
- Draper station platform

General information
- Location: 12997 South FrontRunner Blvd; Draper, Utah; United States
- Coordinates: 40°30′55″N 111°54′16″W
- Owner: Utah Transit Authority (UTA)
- Platforms: 1 island platform
- Tracks: 2
- Connections: UTA: 126, F514, On Demand South Valley

Construction
- Parking: 600 spaces
- Accessible: Yes

History
- Opened: December 10, 2012; 13 years ago

Services
Preceding station	Utah Transit Authority	Following station
South Jordan toward Ogden Central	FrontRunner	Lehi toward Provo Central
Location

Draper station is a FrontRunner commuter rail station in Draper, Utah. It is operated by the Utah Transit Authority (UTA) and is part of the FrontRunner South extension.

== Description ==
The station is located at 12997 South FrontRunner Boulevard and is accessed from I-15 by way of the I-15/12300 South (SR-71) interchange. The station is located on the east side of FrontRunner Boulevard. The station can therefore be accessed from either 12300 South (on the north) or 13490 South (on the southeast).

The station has a Park and Ride two-level parking garage with 600 parking spaces available. This parking garage is one of only two operated by UTA (the other is at the Jordan Valley TRAX Station) and, as of March 21, 2013, the cost for parking the garage is $1 per day or $15 per month. The parking fees help offset the additional cost of maintaining the parking garages over regular parking lots. The station also has what signs indicate is a "Kiss and Ride" lot which allows the driver to remain with the vehicle while a passenger is dropped off or pickup at the station. The station is located within the Quiet Zone, so trains do not routinely sound their horns when approaching public crossings within this corridor. The station opened, along with the rest of FrontRunner South, on December 10, 2012 and is operated by Utah Transit Authority.

== History ==
The Draper (or Draper/Bluffdale, as it was called in the initial planning stages) and Vineyard stations were originally not planned to be completed for the initial opening of FrontRunner South, but rather as infill stations to be built at a later date. However, plans changed and the Draper Station was eventually completed in time for the opening of FrontRunner South, while the Vineyard Station opened in 2022. UTA originally hoped to have the Draper Station further south on the line, but of the four options considered, the current location was chosen as best overall. One of the reasons for this choice was that one of the more preferred locations (near Bangerter Highway [SR-154]) was also in the middle of a Native American archaeological site. While the station itself only occupies about 10 acres, the accompanying transit-oriented development called Vista Station (similar to Station Park, which is adjacent to the Farmington Station) occupies about 175 acres (71 ha). Development of Vista Station was expected to begin in 2014, and several residential and commercial buildings have been completed.
