= Clearfield station =

Commuter rail station in Clearfield, Utah, US

Clearfield
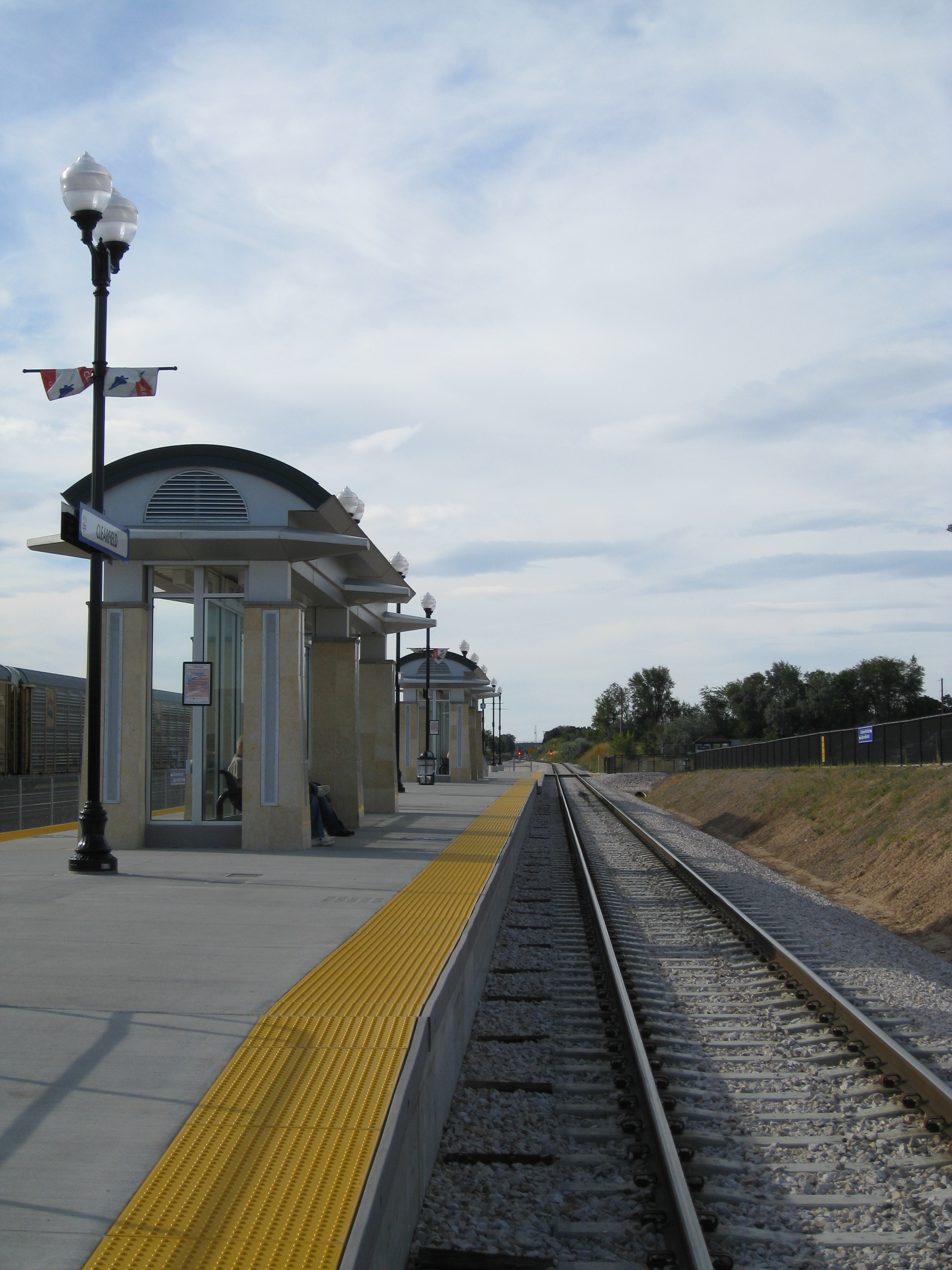
- Clearfield station platform

General information
- Location: 1250 South State Street; Clearfield, Utah; United States
- Coordinates: 41°05′41″N 112°00′50″W
- Owner: Utah Transit Authority (UTA)
- Platforms: 1 island platform
- Tracks: 2
- Connections: UTA: 470, 626, 627, 628, 640

Construction
- Parking: 561 spaces
- Accessible: Yes

History
- Opened: April 26, 2008; 18 years ago

Services
Preceding station	Utah Transit Authority	Following station
Roy toward Ogden Central	FrontRunner	Layton toward Provo Central
Location

Clearfield station is a commuter rail station in Clearfield, Utah, United States served by the FrontRunner, Utah Transit Authority's (UTA) commuter rail train that operates along the Wasatch Front with service from Ogden in central Weber County through Davis County, Salt Lake City, and Salt Lake County to Provo in central Utah County.

== Description ==
The station is located at 1250 South State Street (SR-126) on approximately 73 acres of land and has easy access from I-15 by either 700 South (SR-193) or West Antelope Drive (SR-108). It is located between the Freeport Center and I-15 and south-west of Hill Air Force Base, 2.75 miles (4.43 km) west of the South Gate. It was anticipated to provide commuter service to the approximately 22,600 employees at Hill Air Force Base and the approximately 8,500 employees at the Freeport Center. The station is also within walking distance of the Clearfield City offices, North Davis Junior High School, and Clearfield High School.

The station has a free Park and Ride lot with about 560 parking spaces available. The station is located within the Quiet Zone, so trains do not routinely sound their horns when approaching public crossings within this corridor. The inaugural FrontRunner train departed the station southbound at 9:00 am April 26, 2008. The station is operated by Utah Transit Authority.
