= Lehi station =

Commuter rail station in Lehi, Utah, US

Lehi
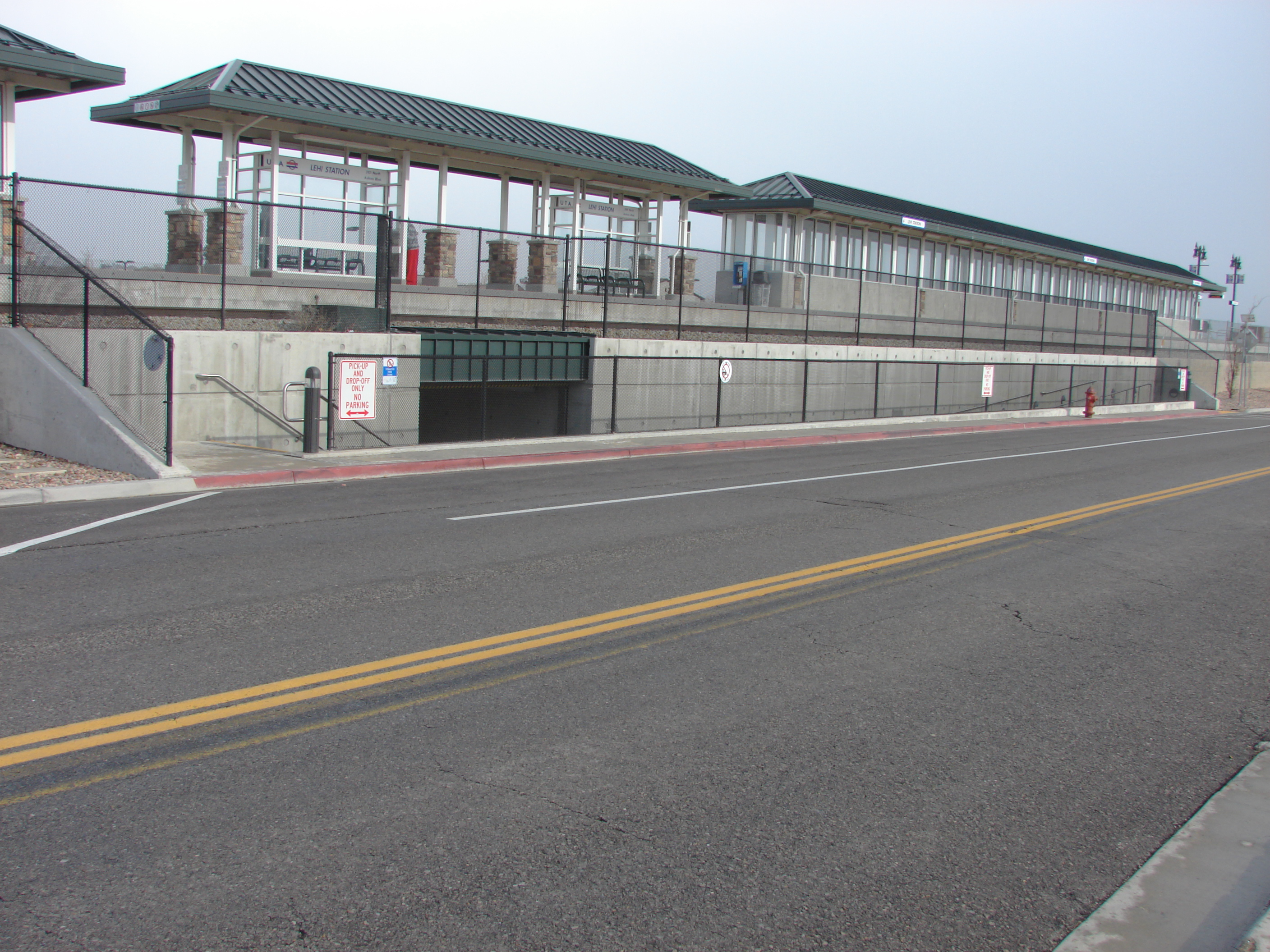
- Lehi station platform

General information
- Location: 3101 North Ashton Boulevard; Lehi, Utah; United States
- Coordinates: 40°25′31″N 111°53′47″W
- Owner: Utah Transit Authority (UTA)
- Platforms: 1 island platform
- Tracks: 2
- Connections: UTA: 806, 807, 850, 871

Construction
- Parking: 739 spaces
- Accessible: Yes

History
- Opened: December 10, 2012; 13 years ago

Services
Preceding station	Utah Transit Authority	Following station
Draper toward Ogden Central	FrontRunner	American Fork toward Provo Central
Location

Lehi station, also known as Thanksgiving Point station, is a FrontRunner commuter rail station in Lehi, Utah. It is operated by the Utah Transit Authority (UTA) and is part of the FrontRunner South extension.

== Location ==
The station is located within the Thanksgiving Point business park at 3101 North Ashton Boulevard and is accessed from I-15 by way of the Timpanogos Highway (SR-92/Club House Drive) interchange. To reach the station, head west from I-15 on Timpanogos Highway (which becomes Clubhouse Drive), then turn left (south) onto Ashton Boulevard.

== Design ==
The station has a Park and Ride lot with over 735 free parking spaces available. Since the Union Pacific (UP) railroad tracks separate the passenger platform from the parking lot and bus stops, there is a pedestrian underpass that allows passengers to cross under the UP tracks. There is also another pedestrian underpass for Garden Drive that connects with the Jordan River Parkway Trail.

The station is located within the Quiet Zone, so trains do not routinely sound their horns when approaching public crossings within this corridor. The station opened, along with the rest of FrontRunner South, on December 10, 2012 and is operated by Utah Transit Authority.
