= Pleasant View station =

Former Commuter rail station in Utah, United States

Pleasant View
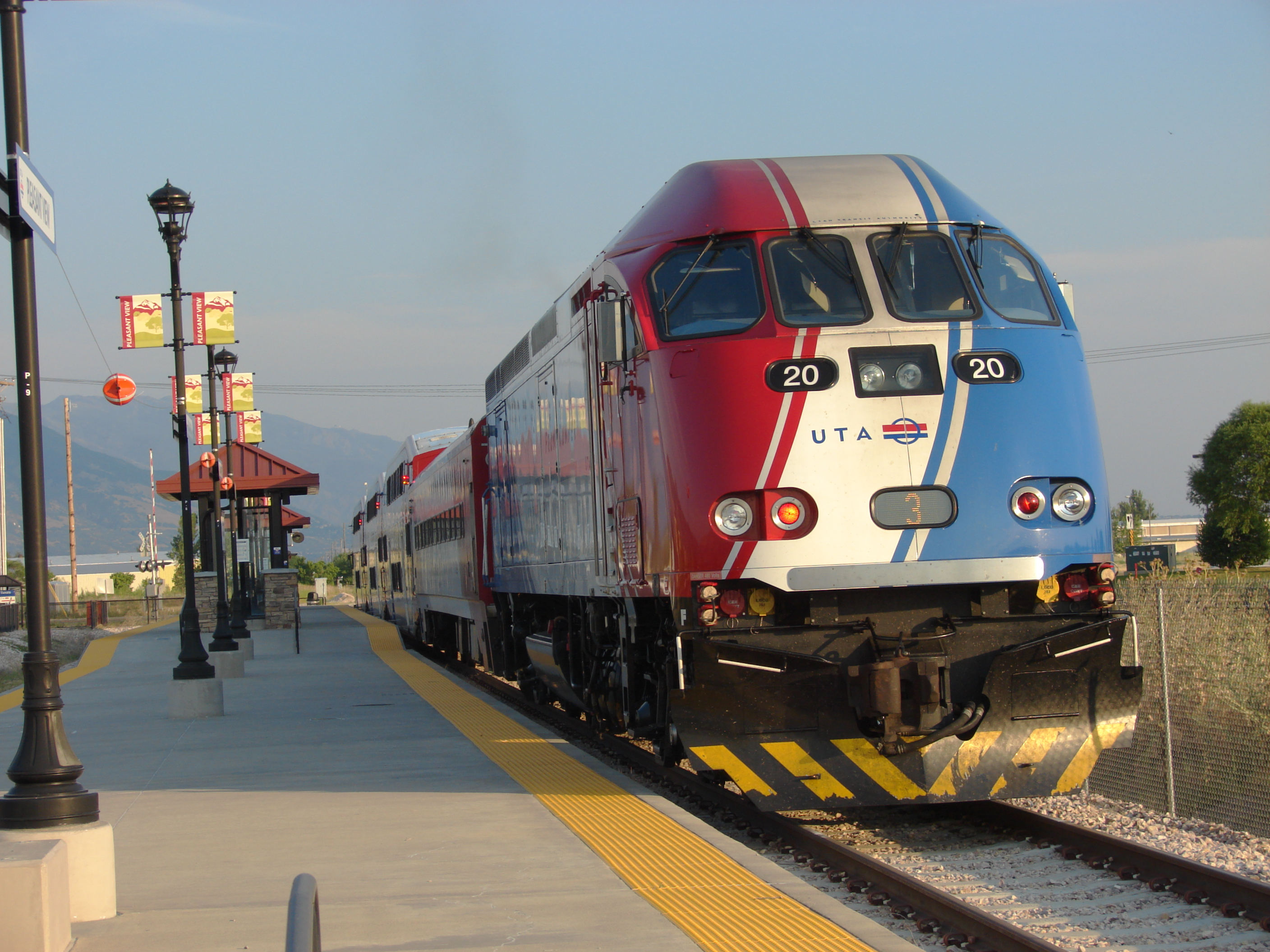
- South at a Frontrunner train at Pleasant View station, July 2014

General information
- Location: 2700 North US Highway 89; Pleasant View, Utah
- Coordinates: 41°18′27″N 112°00′38″W
- System: Utah Transit Authority (UTA); FrontRunner commuter rail station
- Owner: UTA
- Line: Utah Transit Authority (UTA)
- Platforms: 1 side platform
- Tracks: 1
- Connections: UTA local and intra-county bus

Construction
- Structure type: At-grade
- Parking: About 300
- Accessible: Yes

History
- Opened: September 29, 2008
- Closed: August 10, 2018

Services
Preceding station	Utah Transit Authority	Following station
Former services
Terminus	FrontRunner	Ogden toward Provo Central
Location

Pleasant View station is a closed commuter rail station in Pleasant View, Utah, formerly served by the Utah Transit Authority's (UTA) FrontRunner train.

Located approximately 6 miles north of Ogden Central station, Pleasant View was the northernmost station along the FrontRunner line prior to its closure on August 10, 2018, when service north of Ogden was suspended. It was also the least-used station on FrontRunner, with few daily riders. The cost of implementing federally-mandated positive train control for the section of track north of Ogden, which is owned by the Union Pacific Railroad (UP), prompted the closure.

== Description ==
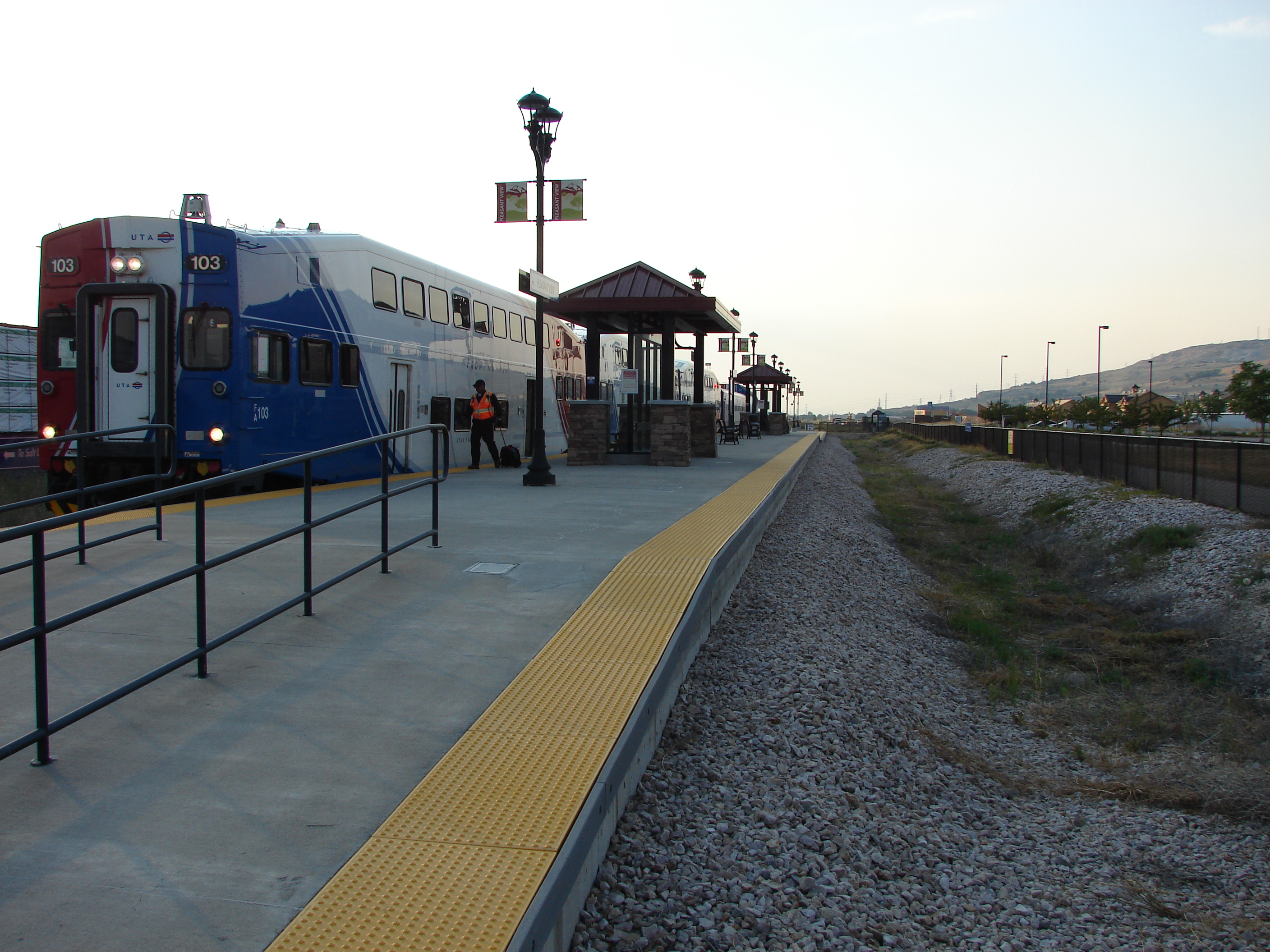
Looking north along Pleasant View station platform, July 2014

The station is located at 2700 North US Highway 89 (US-89) and can be easily accessed from either 2700 North (Utah State Route 134) or US-89. There are about 300 parking spaces in its free park and ride lot. The station is located within the quiet zone, so trains do not routinely sound their horns when approaching public crossings within this corridor.

Prior to truncation, the FrontRunner provided limited service to and from Pleasant View station. While nearly all trains originated or terminated at the Ogden Intermodal Transit Center (now Ogden Central station) in Ogden, each weekday there was service to Pleasant View with two trains picking up passengers in the morning and two more dropping off and picking up passengers in the evening for the commute.

In addition to rail service there is a UTA bus route that provides more frequent service to Ogden Central station. The UTA bus connection runs hourly for the morning and evening commute, with no mid-day or weekend service.

One major reason for limited operation at this station was that the FrontRunner trains had to operate on trackage owned by UP and sharing it with UP freights. From a point north of Ogden to Provo (which currently is the entire FrontRunner system), as well as in the short lead-up to Pleasant View, the FrontRunner has its own dedicated trackage separate from (but parallel to) UP tracks. UTA originally planned to open the station along with the rest of the original start of the FrontRunner service in April 2008, but necessary improvements to the shared stretch of track owned by UP were delayed when railroad workers were diverted to repair tracks damaged by a landslide near Oakridge, Oregon. The station finally opened for service on September 29, 2008. Originally, only two trains serviced each weekday for the morning and evening commutes. However, service was eventually increased to six trains daily before the FrontRunner service was temporarily discontinued on September 6, 2011. Limited service was restored on December 10, 2012, but then cancelled in 2018.

=== Future extension ===
Service on the FrontRunner is planned to extend further north to Brigham City, which would resume service to this station. Should demand rise sufficiently, the station is designed for the addition of a second track.
