= Roy station =

Commuter rail station in Roy, Utah, US

Roy
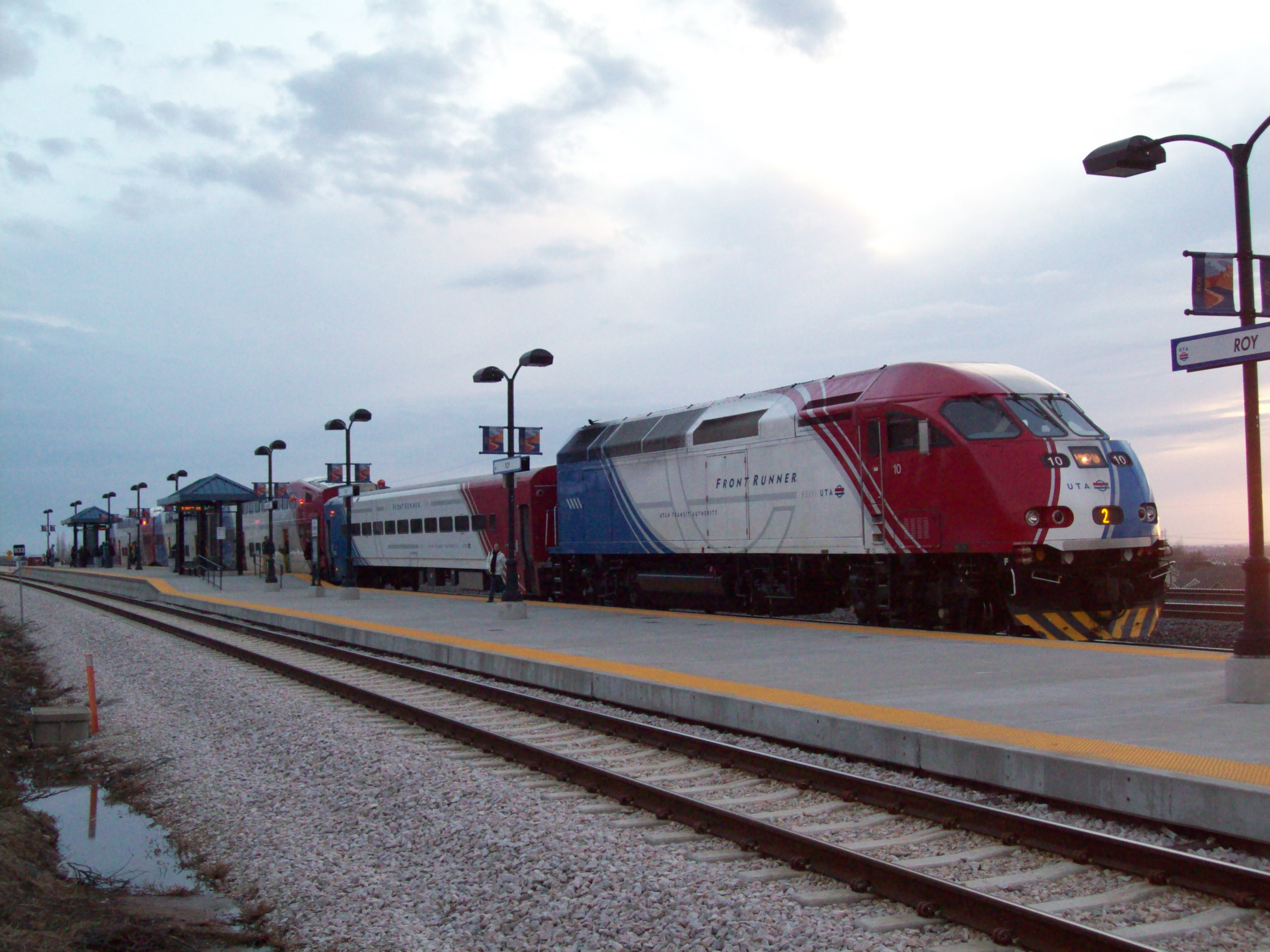
- FrontRunner at Roy station

General information
- Location: 4155 South Sandridge Drive; Roy, Utah; United States
- Coordinates: 41°11′20″N 112°02′21″W
- Owner: Utah Transit Authority (UTA)
- Platforms: 1 island platform
- Tracks: 2
- Connections: UTA: 604, F620

Construction
- Parking: 502 spaces
- Accessible: Yes

History
- Opened: April 26, 2008; 18 years ago

Services
Preceding station	Utah Transit Authority	Following station
Ogden Central Terminus	FrontRunner	Clearfield toward Provo Central
Location

Roy station is a FrontRunner commuter rail station in Roy, Utah, United States. It is operated by the Utah Transit Authority (UTA).

== Description ==
The station is located at 4155 South Sandridge Drive on approximately 20.5 acres of land and is accessed from 4000 South (SR-37) at 2300 West. Unlike nearly all other stations served by the FrontRunner, the station is located in a primarily residential area.

The station has a free Park and Ride lot with about 500 parking spaces available. The station is located within the Quiet Zone, so trains do not routinely sound their horns when approaching public crossings within this corridor. The inaugural FrontRunner train departed the station southbound at 8:30 am on April 26, 2008.
