= Vineyard station =

Vineyard station may refer to:

- Vineyard railway station in Sydney, Australia
- Vineyard station (FrontRunner) in Utah, United States
