= American Fork station =

Commuter rail station in American Fork, Utah, US

American Fork
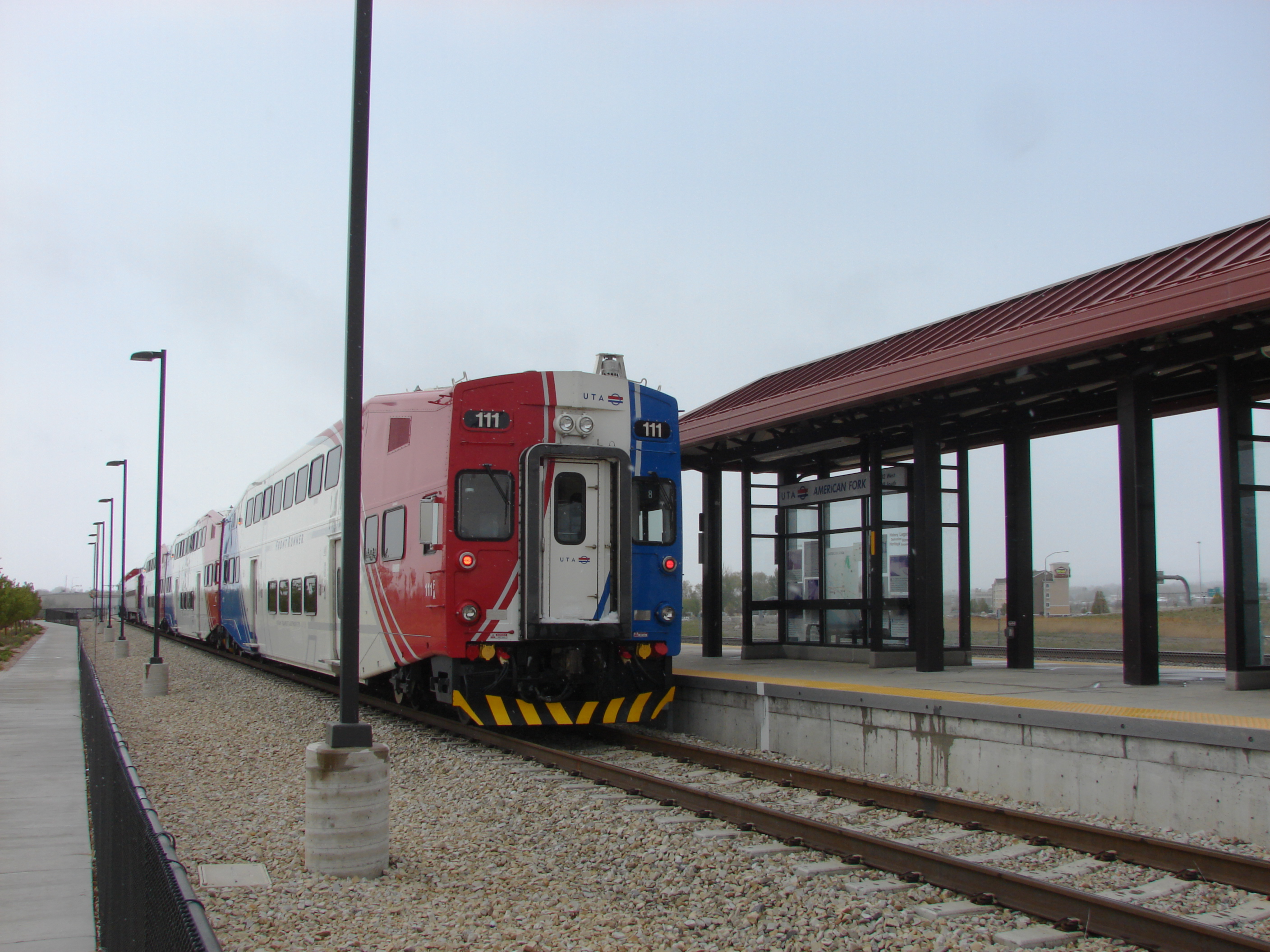
- American Fork station platform

General information
- Location: 3101 North Ashton Boulevard; American Fork, Utah; United States
- Coordinates: 40°22′29″N 111°49′16″W
- Owner: Utah Transit Authority (UTA)
- Platforms: 1 island platform
- Tracks: 2

Construction
- Parking: 553 spaces
- Accessible: Yes

History
- Opened: December 10, 2012; 13 years ago

Services
Preceding station	Utah Transit Authority	Following station
Lehi toward Ogden Central	FrontRunner	Vineyard toward Provo Central
Location

American Fork station is a commuter rail station in American Fork, Utah. It is served by the Utah Transit Authority (UTA)'s FrontRunner train as part of the FrontRunner South extension.

== Description ==
The station is located at 782 West 200 South and is accessed from I-15 by way of the Pioneer Crossing (SR-145/American Fork Main Street) interchange. The station has a free Park and Ride lot with over 550 parking spaces available.

Although a large retail development is located to the north, just across I-15 from the station, there is no direct pedestrian access to the shopping center and there are currently no other commercial developments in close proximity either although residential developments are in the process of being constructed.

The station is located within the Quiet Zone, so trains do not routinely sound their horns when approaching public crossings within this corridor. The station opened, along with the rest of the FrontRunner South, on December 10, 2012 and is operated by Utah Transit Authority.
