= Woods Cross station =

Commuter rail station in Woods Cross, Utah, United States

Woods Cross
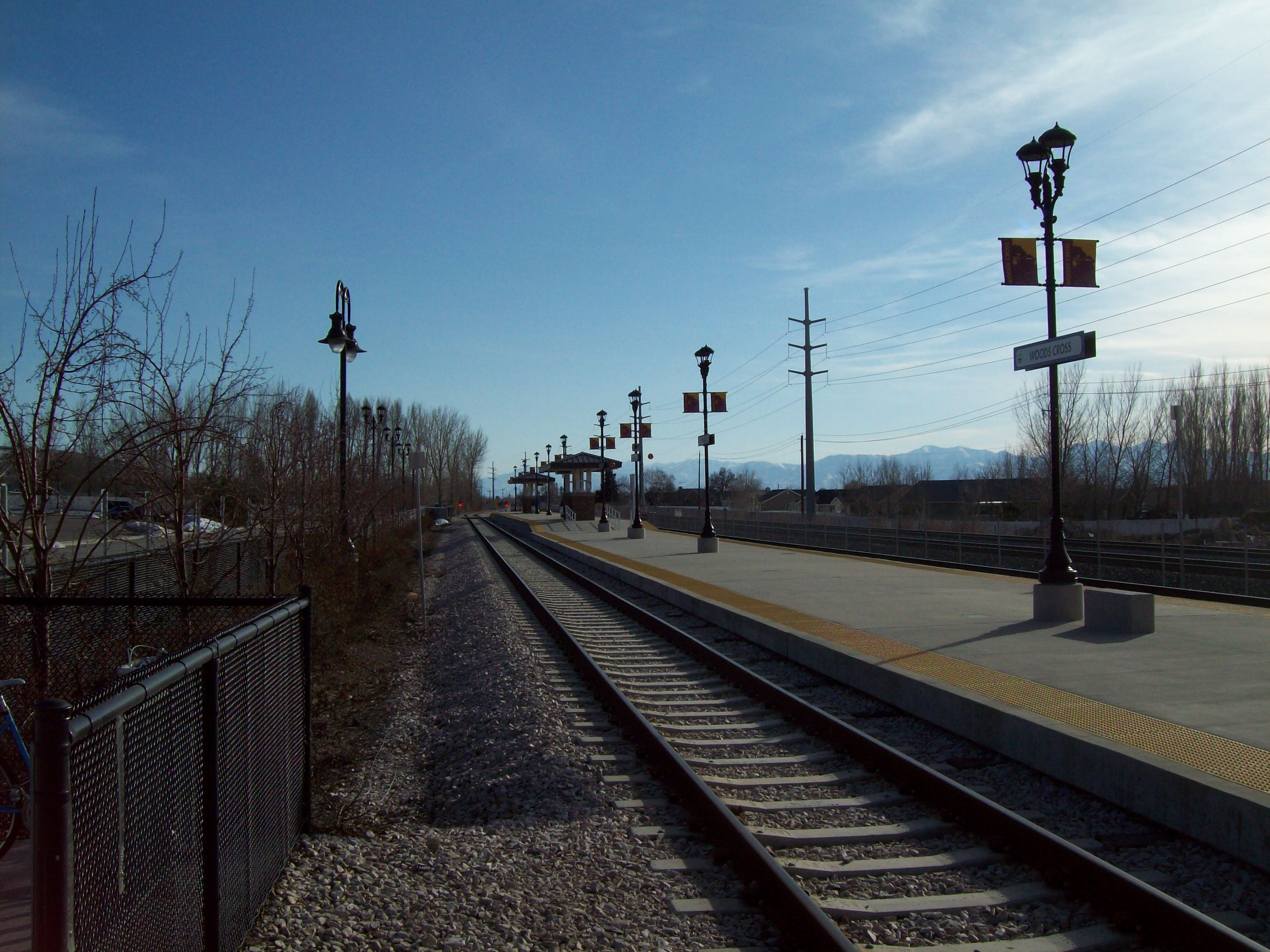
- Woods Cross station platform, March 2013

General information
- Location: 750 South 800 West; Woods Cross, Utah; United States
- Coordinates: 40°52′50″N 111°54′11″W
- Owner: Utah Transit Authority (UTA)
- Platforms: 1 island platform
- Tracks: 2
- Connections: UTA: On Demand South Davis

Construction
- Parking: 235 spaces
- Accessible: Yes

History
- Opened: April 26, 2008; 18 years ago

Services
Preceding station	Utah Transit Authority	Following station
Farmington toward Ogden Central	FrontRunner	North Temple toward Provo Central
Location

Woods Cross station is a FrontRunner commuter rail station in Woods Cross, Utah. It is operated by the Utah Transit Authority (UTA).

== Description ==
The station is located at 750 South 800 West on approximately 13.5 acres of land and is easily accessed from I-15 by way of the 500 South (SR-68) interchange. (From the I-15/500 S interchange, turn south onto 700 West, which after a few blocks curves right, very briefly becoming 700 South, and then curves left and becomes 800 West.) Unlike nearly all other stations served by the FrontRunner, the station is located in a fairly residential area. However, major commercial and retail areas are located just across I-15 to the east in Bountiful and there is an oil refinery located to the northwest of the station on the far side of the tracks and 500 South.

The station has two Park and Ride lots with total of about free 230 parking spaces available. (Note: Recently UTA announced that beginning July 1, 2013 it will start a one year pilot program involving most of its TRAX and FrontRunner Park and Ride lots. The purpose of the new program is to make rider connections with the Salt Lake City International Airport more convenient by avoiding the need to park at the airport. The programs allows UTA patrons to park for an "unlimited amount of time" in the designated Park and Ride lots. In addition, UTA will allow free parking in all of its parking garages. Previous UTA policy limited parking to no more than 24 hours, except at its parking garages. As part of the year long pilot program, "UTA will measure parking lot usage and monitor costs, maintenance requirements, impacts to snow removal and security issues before determining if the program will be extended." There are eight Park and Ride lots that are excluded from this test program and the 24-hour time limit will still apply to these lots. Woods Cross Station's lot is specifically included in this test program. Notwithstanding permission to park for extended periods in the applicable Park and Ride Lots, updated signage at the stations advises that the UTA Transit Police request that they be notified anytime a car is parked in one of the lots for more than seven days.) The primary parking lot is situated between the station platform and 800 West, while the secondary parking lot is very short walk north on the north side of 700 South. The Station is located within the Quiet Zone, so trains do not routinely sound their horns when approaching public crossings within this corridor. The station opened for service on April 26, 2008, and is operated by the Utah Transit Authority.

== History ==
The inaugural FrontRunner train departed the station southbound at 11:30 am on April 26, 2008.

On December 1, 2011, service was to the station was suspended for most of the day due to severe damage cause by a major wind storm that passed through Davis County. Although the Woods Cross station was not directly affected, damage to the Farmington Station was so extensive that a "bus bridge" was used to ferry passengers between the Layton and Salt Lake Central stations while repairs were made. Although full service resumed by 3:00 pm, repairs to the station took several more days to complete.

Woods Cross was formerly the first FrontRunner station north of Salt Lake Central. However, at the same time that FrontRunner South opened on December 10, 2012, a new infill station (North Temple) began service just north of Salt Lake Central, effectively shifting Woods Cross from its position as the first station north of the city.
