= South Jordan station =

Commuter rail station in South Jordan, Utah, US

South Jordan

General information
- Location: 10351 South Jordan Gateway; South Jordan, Utah; United States
- Coordinates: 40°33′47″N 111°54′03″W
- Owner: Utah Transit Authority (UTA)
- Platforms: 1 island platform
- Tracks: 2
- Connections: UTA: 201, 218, 219, F202, F514, On Demand South Valley

Construction
- Parking: 577 spaces
- Accessible: Yes

History
- Opened: December 10, 2012; 13 years ago

Services
Preceding station	Utah Transit Authority	Following station
Murray Central toward Ogden Central	FrontRunner	Draper toward Provo Central
Location

South Jordan station is a FrontRunner commuter rail station in South Jordan, Utah. It is operated by the Utah Transit Authority. It is part of the FrontRunner South extension.

== Description ==
The South Jordan Station (or Sandy/South Jordan as it was referred to by UTA in the early planning stages) is located just west of I-15 at 10351 South Jordan Gateway and is accessed from either 10000 South or 10600 South (SR-151, also known as South Jordan Parkway). The station has a free Park and Ride lot with about 575 parking spaces available. Though the station is in South Jordan and its surroundings to the west are now undergoing greenfield development, it is also fairly close to Sandy's The Shops at South Town mall, which is just across I-15 to the east. Further north of the Station is Salt Lake Community College's Larry H. Miller Campus. The station is located within the Quiet Zone, so trains do not routinely sound their horns when approaching public crossings within this corridor. The station opened, along with the rest of FrontRunner South, on December 10, 2012 and is operated by Utah Transit Authority.

The station is located about five blocks west of Sandy Civic Center Station, and riders can walk, or ride the 201 bus, from one to the other if they so choose. Riders may also use the On Demand rideshare system from a dedicated waiting spot at the bus bays.
