= FrontRunner =

Commuter rail along the Wasatch Front in Utah, United States

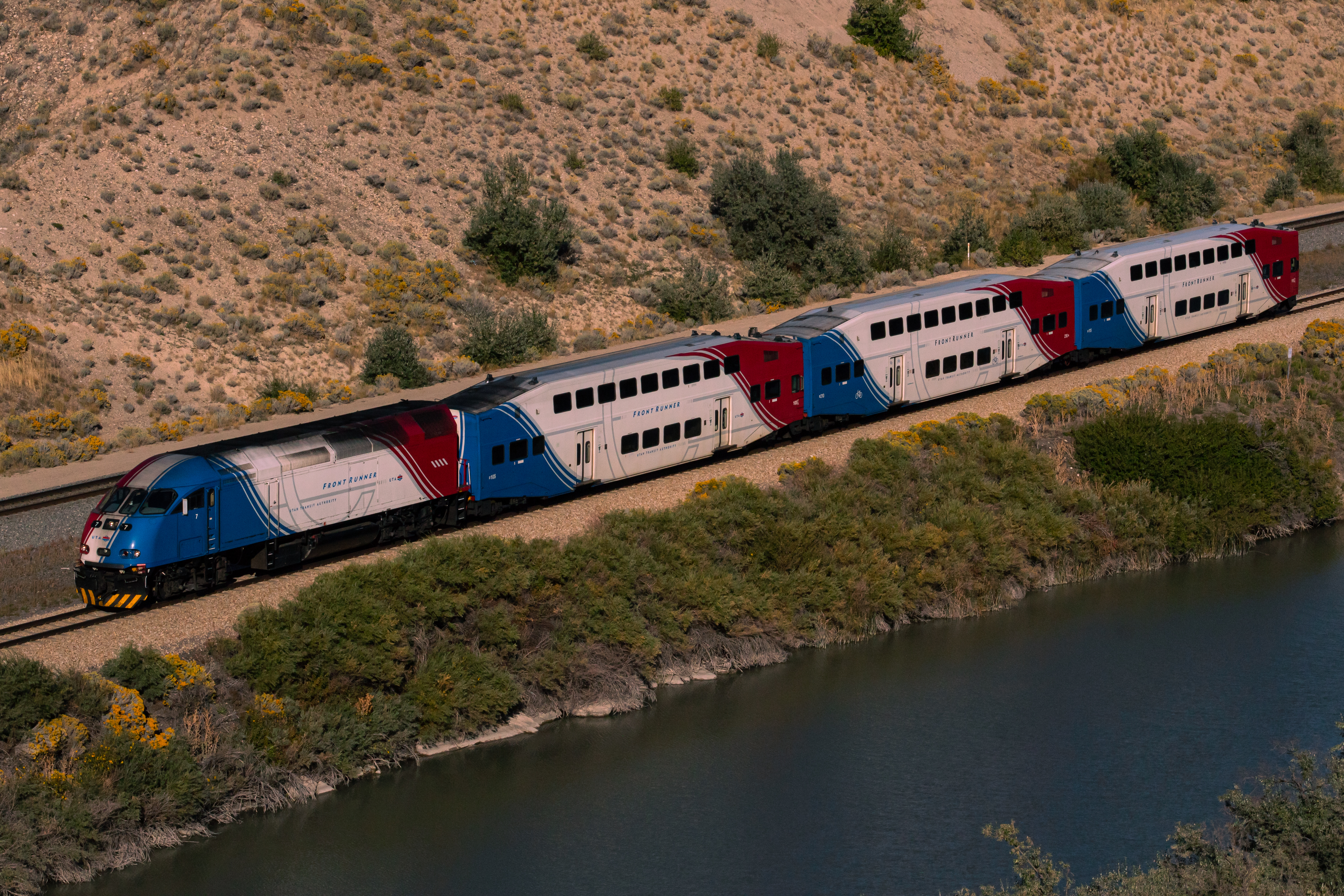
- FrontRunner through the Jordan Narrows, September 2023

Overview
- Owner: Utah Transit Authority (UTA)
- Area served: Davis, Salt Lake, Utah, and Weber counties
- Locale: Wasatch Front, Utah; United States
- Transit type: Commuter rail
- Line number: 750
- Number of stations: 16
- Daily ridership: 14,800 (weekdays, Q2 2026)
- Annual ridership: 4,141,900 (2025)
- Headquarters: 3600 South 700 West; South Salt Lake, Utah
- Website: rideuta.com

Operation
- Began operation: April 26, 2008; 18 years ago
- Operator: Utah Transit Authority
- Reporting marks: UFRC

Technical
- System length: 88 miles (142 km)
- No. of tracks: 1–2
- Track gauge: 4 ft 8 1/2 in (1,435 mm) standard gauge
- Top speed: 79 mph (127 km/h)

FrontRunner (reporting mark UFRC) is a commuter railway operated by the Utah Transit Authority (UTA) that runs along the Wasatch Front in north-central Utah with service from Ogden Central station in central Weber County through Davis County, Salt Lake City, and Salt Lake County to Provo Central station in central Utah County. In 2025, the system had a ridership of 4,141,900, or about 14,800 per weekday as of the second quarter of 2026.

== Description ==
FrontRunner runs south from Ogden to Provo with a total length of 81.2 miles (130.7 km). Before the Pleasant View station was closed, the total length was 88 miles (142 km).

The route uses a portion of the right-of-way of the historic Utah Central Railroad, built in 1869 to connect the First transcontinental railroad with Salt Lake City and acquired by the Union Pacific Railroad (UP) in 1878. UTA-owned track parallels UP track until Ogden, where, until August 10, 2018 (date of last train), when service to Pleasant View was "Suspended Indefinitely", Union Pacific and UTA shared the final 6 mi (9.7 km) of track to Pleasant View.

Seventy-four percent of the route used by FrontRunner is single-tracked, with double-track at stations and several other points along the route to allow trains to pass each other. FrontRunner closely parallels Interstate 15 for most of the route.

There are about 25 round trips on weekdays between Ogden and Provo (through Salt Lake City). Trains run hourly from about 4:30 a.m. to just after midnight on weekdays (increasing to half-hour runs for the morning and evening commutes). On Saturdays trains run every hour from about 6 a.m. to 1:30 a.m. FrontRunner does not currently operate on Sundays. FrontRunner operates some service on holidays other than Thanksgiving, Christmas and the observed Christmas holiday, and New Year's Day and the observed New Year's holiday. FrontRunner is a push–pull train locomotive system (with the locomotives running backwards half the time). FrontRunner locomotives face north, regardless of the direction of travel.

Several stations have a Park and Ride lot. There is no charge for parking in these lots, and the number of parking spaces available at each station ranges from "limited" to 874.

== History ==
In 1998 UTA tested a commuter train set borrowed from the Altamont Corridor Express along Union Pacific track which runs alongside what would eventually be the FrontRunner route. In the same year, UTA began negotiations with Union Pacific to purchase the former Salt Lake Shops. By 2002 an agreement to purchase the shop and renovate it to become UTA's Warm Springs Shop was approved. Work started on the initial section of the line from Salt Lake City to Ogden in 2005. Seven of the planned eight stations opened to riders on April 26, 2008. Eight more stations opened on December 10, 2012, and one more on August 8, 2022.

The train was named "FrontRunner" because its route runs nearly the length of the Wasatch Front.

=== FrontRunner North ===
What is now known as the FrontRunner North division was the original segment of the line that opened to the public on April 26, 2008. At the time, the service only ran from Ogden to Salt Lake Central with stops in Roy, Clearfield, Layton, Farmington, and Woods Cross.

The station in Pleasant View, which is north of Ogden, was anticipated to open along with the rest of the line in April 2008, but it was plagued by a variety of service problems stemming from the last 6 miles (9.7 km) of track being shared with Union Pacific Railroad freight service. Firstly, improvements had to be made to the track to make it suitable for passenger operations, but that work was delayed when railroad workers were diverted to repair tracks damaged by a landslide near Oakridge, Oregon. A bus bridge was used between Ogden and Pleasant View until September 29, 2008, when the track improvements were complete.

Another issue was that the shared track was still dispatched by Union Pacific, who did not want FrontRunner service to interfere with their busy freight corridor in Ogden. As such, they limited FrontRunner to one southbound train in the morning and one northbound in the evening. Riders were required to transfer from one train to another at Ogden Central station. In January 2009 this was increased to three trains for each morning and evening, with one running straight through in each direction, though the other two still required transfers between trains.

Service to Pleasant View was temporarily suspended on September 6, 2011. Besides the limitations on how many trains could run north of Ogden, low ridership exacerbated the problem. Limited weekday-only commuter service to Pleasant View resumed on December 10, 2012, with two trains picking up passengers in the morning and two trains dropping off passengers in the evening, with no transfers between trains required.

In February 2018, UTA announced they would be indefinitely suspending trains between Ogden and Pleasant View starting on August 12, 2018, both due to new federal safety guidelines and low ridership to that station. The station platforms at Pleasant View are still there and the facility is used for bus transfers and parking, and the station will see trains again when FrontRunner service is expanded further north to Brigham City.

=== FrontRunner South ===
FrontRunner South refers to 44 miles (71 km) that were added to the FrontRunner line after the opening of FrontRunner North in 2008. The extension expands the former southern terminus from Salt Lake Central to Provo Station. This expansion was planned early on to address the growing transportation need along the Interstate 15 corridor. The Utah Transit Authority began work on the line after a ground breaking ceremony on August 12, 2008, and seven new stations were built in Murray, South Jordan, Draper, Lehi, American Fork, Orem, and Provo. Service began on the new section on December 10, 2012. Funds were appropriated to accommodate this project in 2006 via a sales tax increase referendum, and the remaining funding was obtained through a letter of intent signed with the Federal Transit Administration (FTA) on September 24, 2007.

Following its opening for service in 2012, early estimates of ridership for FrontRunner South exceeded expectations. UTA anticipated about 6,800 riders per day, but during the first week of operation, they reported more than 7,800 riders per day. However, UTA also indicated that it was not entirely unexpected as there is usually a high number of riders when a line opens before a longer term pattern of regular ridership is established. At the same time FrontRunner South opened for service, North Temple - a new infill station on the FrontRunner North segment - opened as well.

FrontRunner South opened with service to Utah County at about the same time as the I-15 CORE project was completed (which was a rebuild of I-15 along much of the same corridor as FrontRunner South). Both projects added substantial transportation improvements to areas south of Salt Lake City.

The city of Lehi continues investigating options to build overpasses or underpasses to separate the rail traffic from the Main Street vehicle traffic, though the status of this is unlikely as the cost of the project would exceed $20 million. Since the original planning for FrontRunner South, two additional east–west alternative routes in Lehi have opened that do not have at-grade crossings for rail traffic: 2100 North (State Route 85) and Pioneer Crossing (State Route 145).

On August 8, 2022, Vineyard station, a new infill station a couple miles north of the Orem Central station, opened.

== Future projects ==
Future extensions are envisioned that would eventually encompass over 110 miles (180 km) along the Wasatch Front, providing service as far north as Brigham City and as far south as Payson. In September 2023, UTA revealed their drafted plans for Frontrunner's future expansions and enhancements. Ranging from phases 1 to 6.

=== FrontRunner 2X ===
Phase 1 is known as FrontRunner 2X; which started initially as double tracking at strategic locations to increase maximum frequency from thirty minutes to fifteen. In 2021, Utah passed legislation to fund a project to double track FrontRunner at strategic locations. Later, the Utah Department of Transportation (UDOT) made their own plans to add an infill station at Bluffdale just south of Draper around this construction period. Initially separate projects, in 2024, FrontRunner 2X began to include in the project cost of both the expected amount for the initial double tracking, and the extra double tracking required to construct an infill station at The Point. FrontRunner 2X has also expanded to include track realignment at Warm Springs Yard and a new maintenance facility at Beck Yard. FrontRunner 2X will also include the acquisition of at least 10 Stadler FLIRT trainsets. FrontRunner 2X is awaiting for approval from a federal grant to start construction, but is planned to proceed with construction in 2027 with a 2030 completion at a cost of $3.2 Billion.

=== Future phases ===
The next phase, Phase 2, consists of further double tracking, and a 13-mile (21 km) extension to Payson. UTA previously purchased the former Denver and Rio Grande Western Railroad Tintic Branch tracks that run between Provo and Payson to serve as their right-of-way. The need for a flying junction that would have had to be built just southeast of the Provo Station to allow FrontRunner to cross over the active Union Pacific tracks there prevented UTA from building this extension as part of the FrontRunner South project. UTA has made a deal with Union Pacific where FrontRunner would run down tracks on the west side of the Provo Yard, then construct a flyover north of Springville station to allow for a connection with the Tintic Branch. The location of the station in Springville is anticipated to be approximately 1500 West and 450 South. (Note: The Tintic Branch runs from about 400 South and 400 West in Springville to just west of I-15 on the north end of Spanish Fork and then continues along the west side of I-15 to 800 South in Payson. From Payson, it passes by the northern edge of Santaquin, before heading west to Eureka.) The Utah Department of Transportation (UDOT) has announced that accommodations for a FrontRunner station just west of I-15 are included in the overall plans for a new interchange at Spanish Fork Center Street. The location of the station in Payson was originally anticipated to be just west of I-15 at about 800 South, has since been moved north closer to the area of a planned interchange for Nebo Beltway Drive. UTA also has plans to build a light maintenance facility to store FrontRunner's in Utah County to allow for close access.

Phase 3 includes a 20-mile (32 km) extension to Brigham City. The location of the station in Brigham City will likely be on newly built right-of-way near the western end of 200 South, where the Utah Transit Authority already owns a Park and Ride lot, only used for vanpool services to Thiokol, with an additional station in Willard just east of I-15 at about 750 North. An agreement between the UTA, Ogden City, and Weber County to construct a station at Business Depot Ogden was reached in 2020. Included in the extension, is the planned fleet overhaul to 32 electric trainsets, which will include 15 miles of electrified track with the rest being dependent on batteries. Finally, the phase plans to include upgrading 48 miles to 90 mph track, which also comes with curve upgrades.

Phase 4 includes more upgrades in frequency, trainsets, and trackspeed. Phase 5 includes infill stations, 62 miles (100 km) of 110+ mph track, and full grade separation. Phase 6, the final drafted phase, would include 24 miles (39 km) of quadruple track to allow for express trains. As with all existing FrontRunner and TRAX stations, all future phases of FrontRunner will be integrated with UTA's bus system.

== Route ==
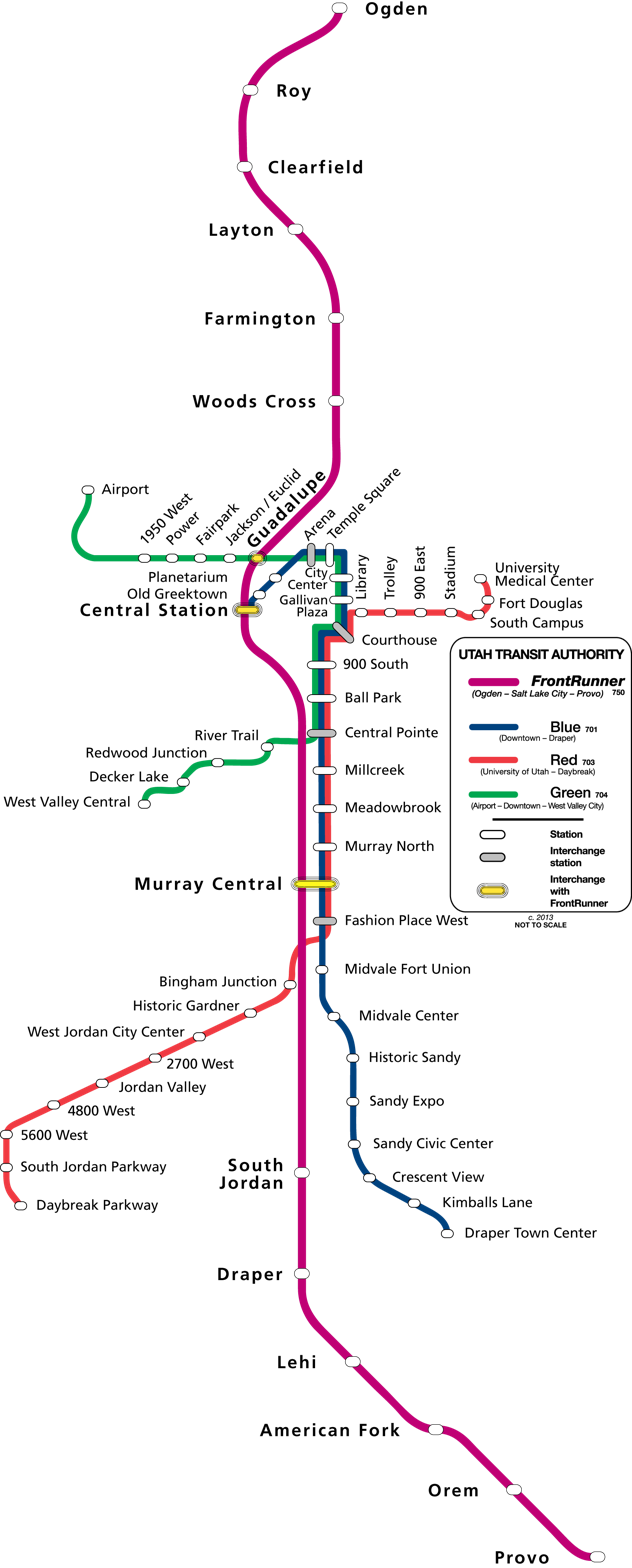
A map of the entire UTA rail system in August 2013

FrontRunner is designated as UTA Route 750.

The entire route was built within the existing Union Pacific corridor and FrontRunner tracks run parallel to the Union Pacific tracks for most of the route. Except for the decommissioned Pleasant View portion of the line, FrontRunner operates on its own dedicated tracks.

=== Quiet zone ===
The entire length of FrontRunner corridor (including the southern extension) was approved as a "quiet zone" by the Federal Railroad Administration. Normally, federal regulations require that train operators sound their horns for fifteen to twenty seconds as they approach any road crossing. A quiet zone designation eliminates this requirement. For safety reasons however, they are still allowed to sound their horn, if appropriate. The quiet zone applies to all trains (including freight trains) within the same corridor. Each city along the route had to individually apply for the designation, but UTA provided substantial assistance with the process. Several safety upgrades must be in place at all public crossings in order to receive quiet zone approval. In addition to the normal automatic warning bells and lights, required upgrades include crossing guards, signs warning that trains do not blare horns in the area, and raised medians (which prevent cars from driving around lowered gates). There are also additional safety features for pedestrians. According to UTA, prior to the southern extension, FrontRunner had the longest quiet zone in the nation, with the southern extension doubling the length of the previous quiet zone.

In September 2024, the quiet zone on the entire length of the FrontRunner corridor, including the freight tracks, was suspended after an FRA inspection concluded that some cities on the corridor failed to meet standards for quiet zones for their crossings. The suspension is to be in effect until all crossings comply with FRA requirements. The southern quiet zone between Salt Lake Central and Provo was reinstated in January 2025 after meeting FRA requirements; a petition to reinstate the northern quiet zone, temporarily waiving certain safety requirements, was approved in March 2025.

=== Utah County ===
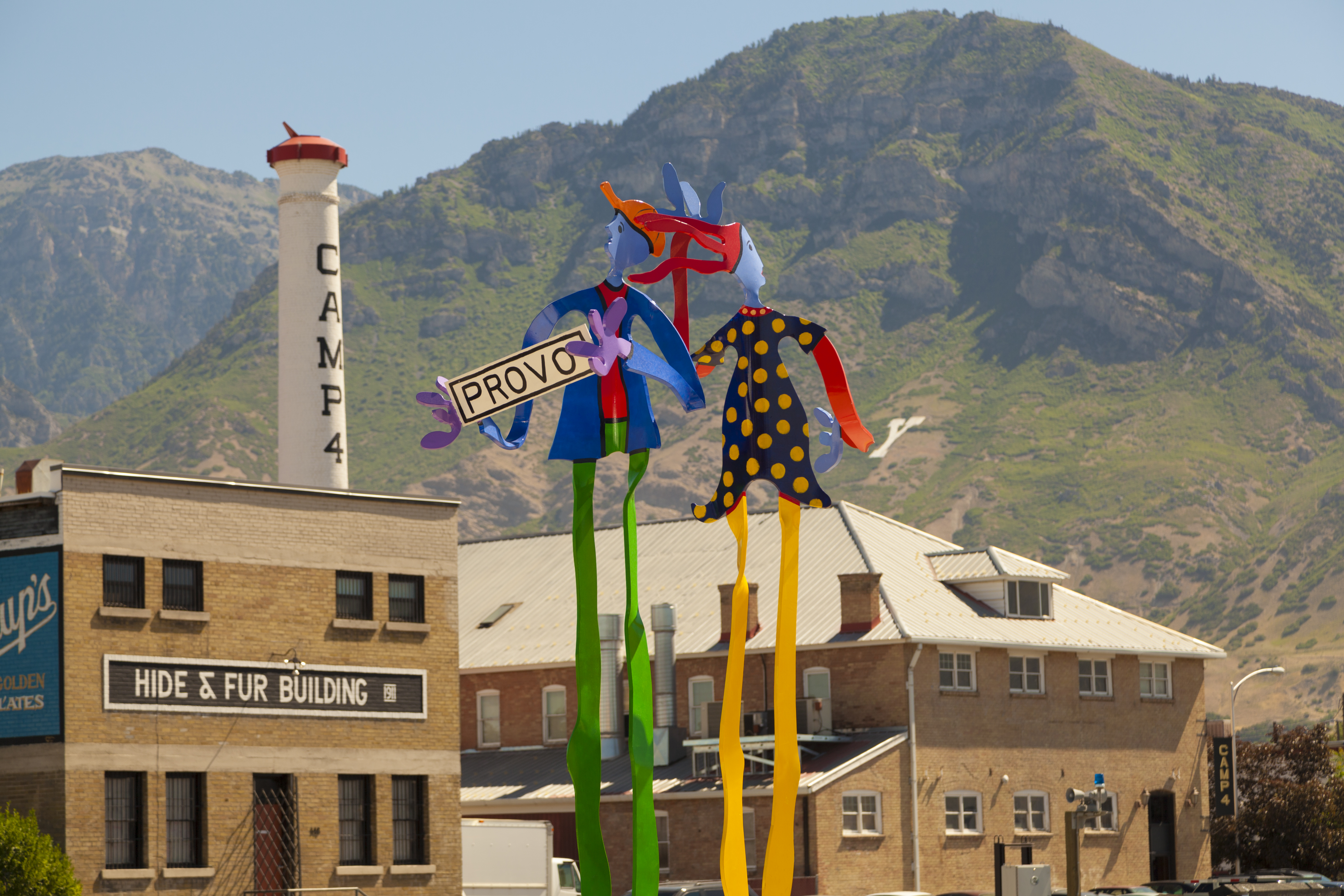
Art at the Provo Central station

FrontRunner's current southern terminus is the Provo Central station. This station is one block from the Amtrak Provo station, which serves the California Zephyr. Heading west from this station, FrontRunner crosses southern Provo before it curves toward the north. From here it heads northwest along the western side of Provo. The railway primarily parallels I-15 along this portion as it moves north towards Orem.

Continuing northwest, the route enters the city of Orem before reaching the Orem Central station, located on the west side of I-15 from Utah Valley University (UVU). In June 2018, ground was broken on a new 1000-foot pedestrian bridge over Interstate-15, connects UVU to the Orem Central station. From this station FrontRunner maintains its northwestern course, leaving Orem and enters the city of Vineyard. Continuing northwest, with Vineyard Road briefly running on the west side of the tracks and the site of the former Geneva Steel on the east, it reaches Vineyard station. The Vineyard station is located on the west edge of a future UVU Vineyard campus.

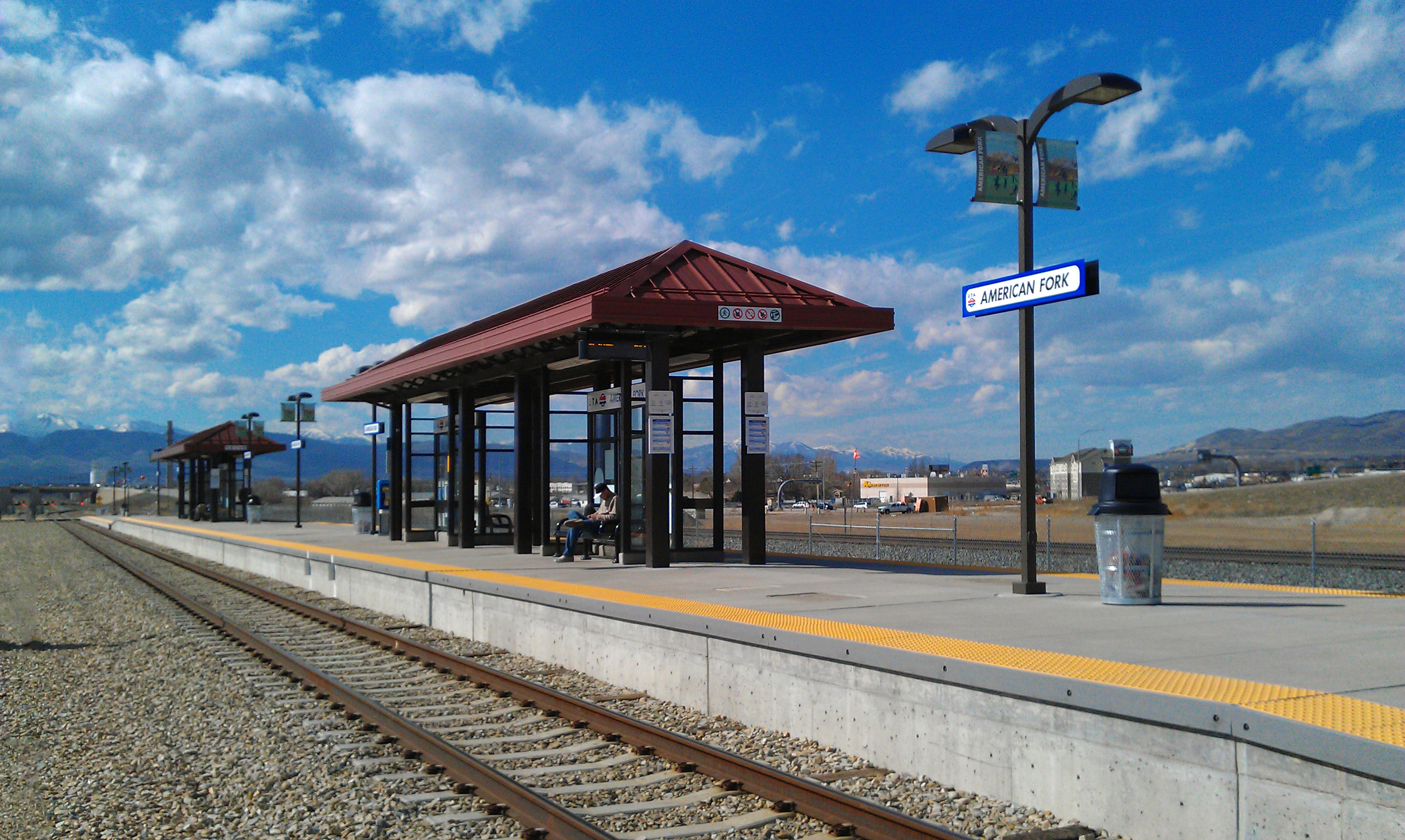
American Fork station passenger platform.

From the Vineyard station, FrontRunner leaves Vineyard, passing through the city of Lindon before entering the city of American Fork. Maintaining its northwest course along the edge of American Fork's city limits, Frontrunner then enters the city of Lehi. It then begins to curve toward a nearly due west course as it re-enters American Fork and parallels I-15 before reaching the American Fork station.

Continuing on, FrontRunner enters Lehi just before crossing over Spring Creek and then directly underneath the intersection of Pioneer Crossing (SR-145) and Mill Pond Road (850 East). It travels northwest through the middle of Lehi as it approaches Thanksgiving Point.

With Garden Drive on its immediate west, it reaches the next station, Lehi, in the middle of Thanksgiving Point. As passes then through the Jordan Narrows, it briefly parallels the Jordan River on the south, with Camp Williams on the far side of the river further west. While passing through the Jordan Narrows, FrontRunner also leaves Lehi and Utah County and enters Salt Lake County.

=== Salt Lake County ===
As it passes through the Jordan Narrows, FrontRunner enters Salt Lake County and the city of Bluffdale. As it leaves the Jordan Narrows it curves north as it passes just east of Turner Dam and the pumping stations while crossing over East Jordan Canal and the Jordan River. It then curves west as it continues on between the Jordan River on the east and 985 West and the Utah and Salt Lake Canal on the west. It then curves north again as it passes just west of the Joint Dam and then crosses over the South Jordan Canal. It then crosses back over the Jordan River and then the Jordan and Salt Lake City Canal. Continuing north, and slightly to the east, it parallels the South Jordan Canal, the South Jordan Canal Trail, and the Jordan River on the west. It then curves to the northeast, leaving Bluffdale and enters the city of Draper.

After entering Draper it continues its northeast course and reaches the Draper station. From there, it continues north, leaving Draper and enters the city of South Jordan. Continuing north, and still slightly to the east, FrontRunner crosses South Jordan Parkway (10600 South/SR-151) before reaching the next station, South Jordan. This station is located on the west side of I-15 from the South Towne Center Mall. From this station, the route heads north as it leaves South Jordan and enters the city of Sandy.

Just after entering Sandy, it crosses over to the east side of the Union Pacific tracks at a flying junction. Maintaining this course, it leaves Sandy and enters the city of Midvale. After West Center Street it curves back once again to the north, and slightly to the east, and then crosses Jordan River Boulevard (7200 South/SR-151) at 560 West and continues on, running parallel to I-15 and passing the Union Pacific rail yard on the west, until it crosses under the I-15 on ramp from eastbound I-215 (Belt Route) as well as I-15 at 400 West. Just after crossing under I-15, FrontRunner leaves Midvale and enters the city of Murray.

=== TRAX connections ===
Frontrunner has three intermodal connections to TRAX, the local light rail train network. TRAX serves Salt Lake County and has three lines: the Blue Line from Salt Lake Central to Draper, the Green Line from West Valley Central to Salt Lake International Airport, and the Red Line from University Medical Center to Daybreak Parkway. Frontrunner fare transfers to TRAX, but TRAX fare does not transfer to Frontrunner. Riders can, however, purchase Frontrunner fare at TRAX stations or online, and then use that to cover both portions of an intermodal trip.

==== Murray Central ====
Just northeast of the 5400 South crossing is the next station, Murray Central station. This station is a transfer station to the TRAX Blue and Red lines and the first of three transfer stations between FrontRunner and TRAX. This station is located at 140 West Vine Street (5100 South). The Murray Central station is located east of the Murray station.

After this station, FrontRunner continues north, leaving Murray and entering the city of South Salt Lake. Continuing north, the route passes through South Salt Lake and enters Salt Lake City.

==== Salt Lake Central ====
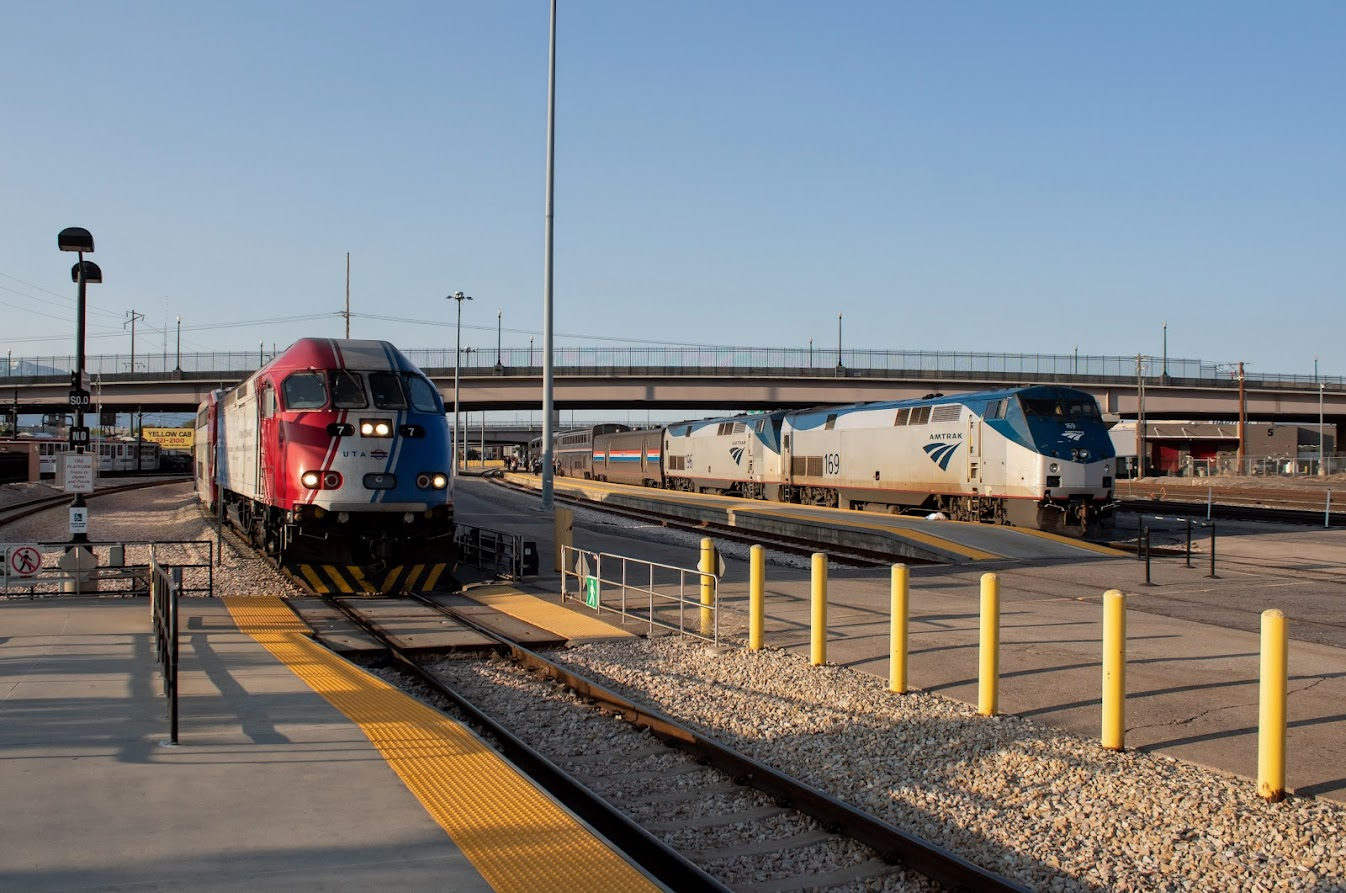
Salt Lake Central is one of two stations that FrontRunner has a connection with the California Zephyr

Continuing north, FrontRunner passes through Salt Lake City and then curves slightly to the west, reaching Salt Lake Central (Salt Lake City Intermodal Hub). This station is the second transfer station to the TRAX Blue Line, after Murray Central station, and the second of three transfer stations between FrontRunner and TRAX. The FrontRunner part of this station is located at 250 South 600 West and the TRAX part at 325 South 600 West. The TRAX platform is directly east of the FrontRunner platform. (Salt Lake Central is the northern terminus for the TRAX Blue line, which runs south to Draper.)

Salt Lake Central is also one of four stops on Amtrak's California Zephyr in Utah.

==== North Temple ====
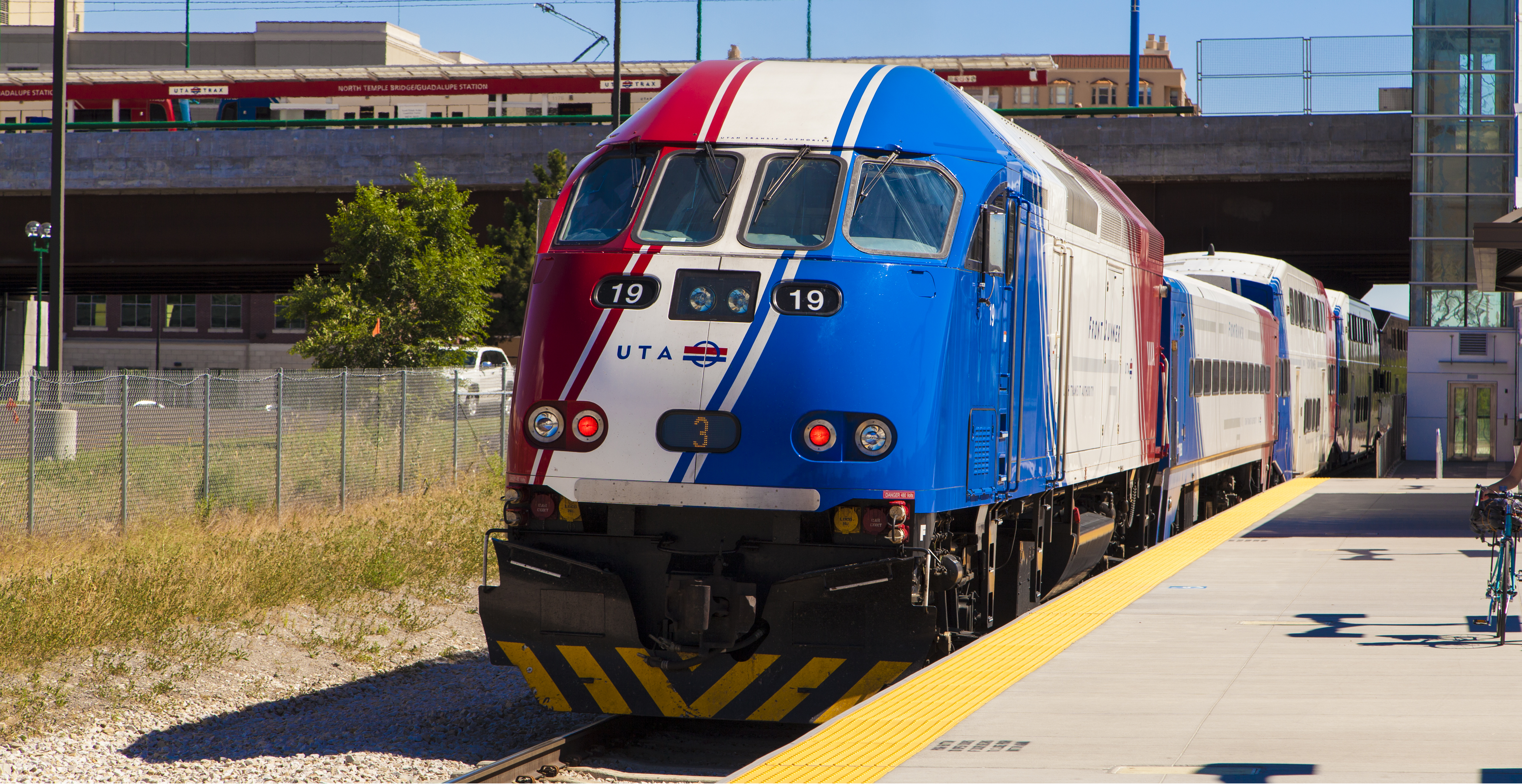
FrontRunner passes under the TRAX passenger platform at North Temple station

From Salt Lake Central, FrontRunner continues north while passing on the west side of Salt Lake City. Immediately after crossing under the North Temple Viaduct, it reaches the next station, North Temple. This station is a transfer station to the TRAX Green Line, along which is signed as "North Temple Bridge/Guadalupe", which is located on top of the North Temple Street Viaduct. The TRAX Green Line runs west to the Salt Lake City International Airport and southwest to West Valley City via Downtown Salt Lake City.

From North Temple station, FrontRunner continues northward through Salt Lake City, passing on the northeast side of the Warm Springs Service Center (UTA's maintenance facility for FrontRunner). At about 2400 North it leaves Salt Lake City and Salt Lake County and crosses into Davis County.

=== Davis County ===
Upon entering Davis County, FrontRunner also enters the city of North Salt Lake. Continuing north, it passes through North Salt Lake and enters the city of Woods Cross. Still maintaining its course to the north and slightly to the east, it reaches the next station, Woods Cross, at 750 South 800 West. From this station it continues on its northeast course as it leaves Woods Cross and enters the city of West Bountiful. Passing northwest through West Bountiful, the route enters the city of Centerville as it continues north along the west side of I-15. Continuing north, it leaves Centerville and enters the city of Farmington Upon entering Farmington, the route continues north until it reaches the Farmington station, at 450 West 800 North. At the northwest end of this station, FrontRunner crosses under the pedestrian bridge (which allows passengers to cross over the FrontRunner and Union Pacific tracks which run between the station's passenger platform and the station's parking lot).

Following this station, FrontRunner leaves Farmington and enters the city of Kaysville. Continuing along the west side of I-15 it continues north, leaving Kaysville and entering the city of Layton. Immediately after crossing under Layton Parkway, FrontRunner reaches the next station, Layton at 150 South Main Street. Heading north from the station, it continues north through Layton before leaving the city and entering the city of Clearfield.

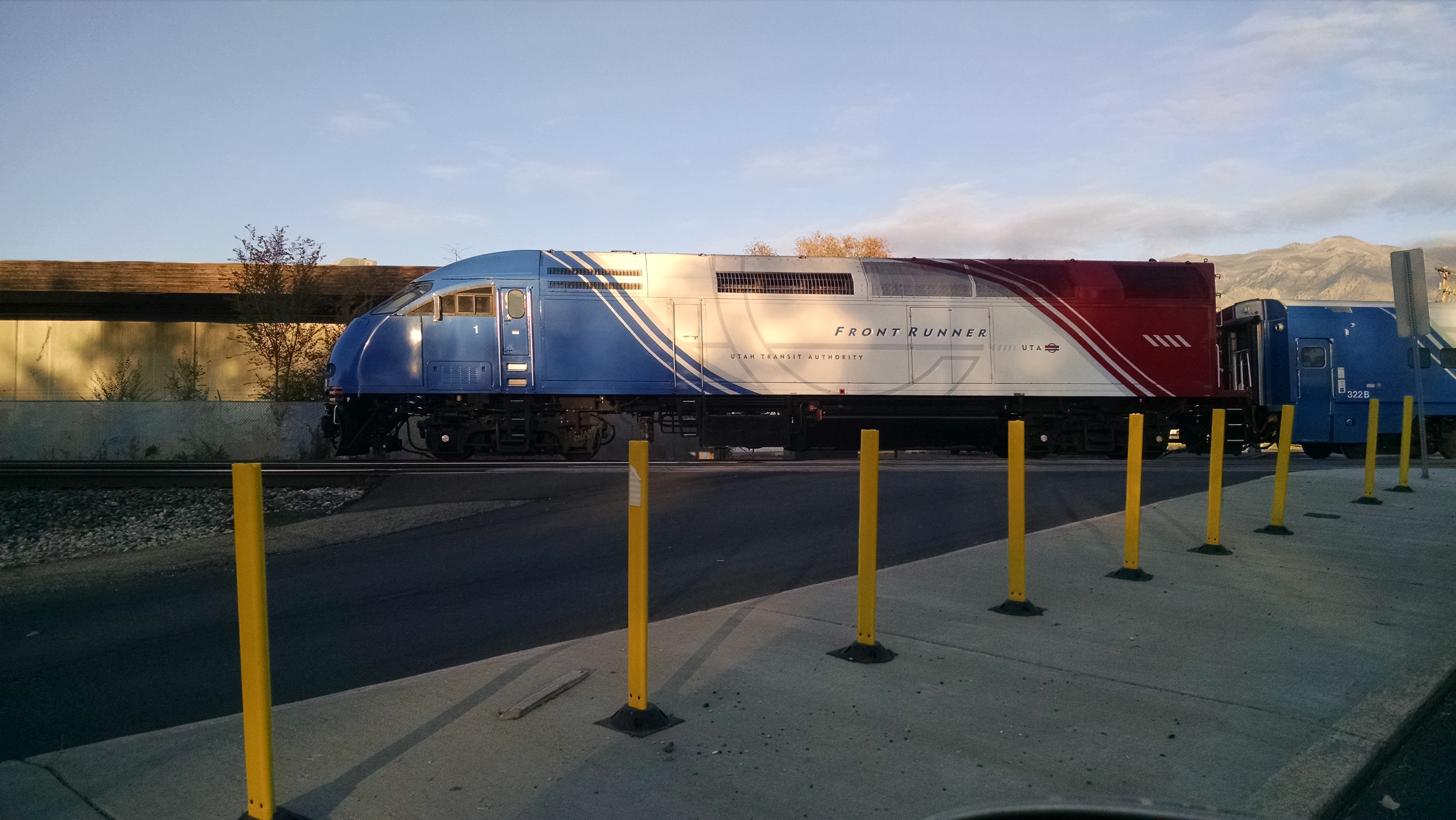
Front Runner crossing West Gentile in Layton.

Continuing northwest FrontRunner reaches the next station, Clearfield, at 1250 South State Street (SR-126. From this station the route continues northwest and then north as it passes through Clearfield. It then leaves Clearfield and enters the city of Clinton. Heading north it passes immediately west of the border between Clinton and the city of Sunset, then leaving Clinton and Davis County and enters Weber County.

=== Weber County ===
Upon entering Weber County, FrontRunner also enters the city of Roy, but briefly runs immediately west of the border between Roy and Sunset. Continuing north, it passes through the city before reaching the next station, Roy, at 4155 South Sandridge Drive. Just after this station the route continues north, leaving Roy and entering the city of Ogden.

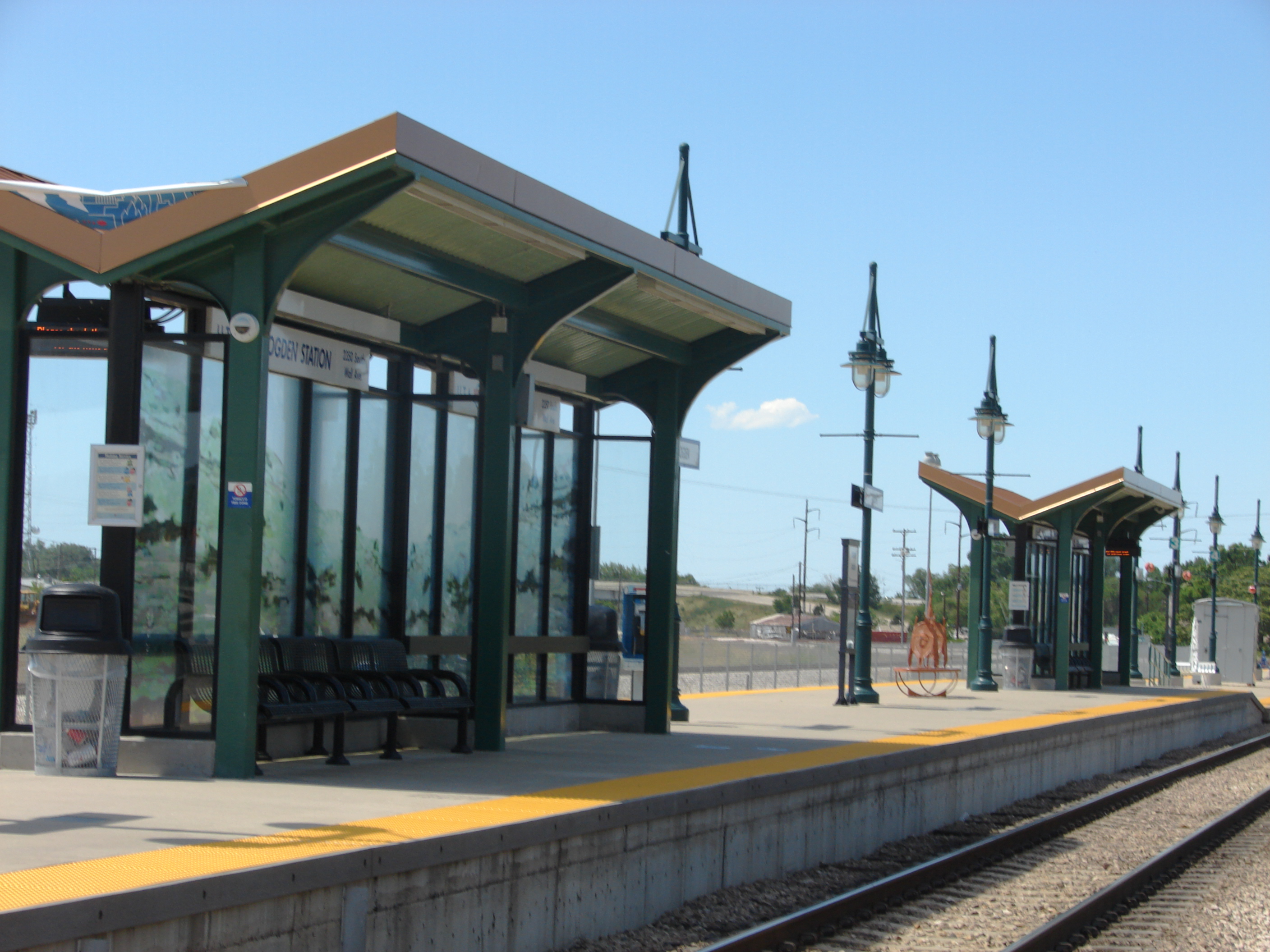
Ogden Central station platforms, the Northern Terminus of FrontRunner.

Just after entering Ogden, FrontRunner crosses over the Weber River. After the Weber River it passes to the west of Ogden's Union Station, and then reaches Ogden Central station at 2350 South Wall Avenue. This station is the last stop on the northern end of FrontRunner.

Before 2018, FrontRunner trains continued northwest from Ogden Central station towards Pleasant View. Rider service ends at Ogden Central, but the tracks continue northward. Just after crossing 17th Street (1700 South) at 450 West, it curves back to the north again as FrontRunner tracks merge with tracks owned and operated by Union Pacific. Continuing north, it leaves Ogden and enters the city of Harrisville.

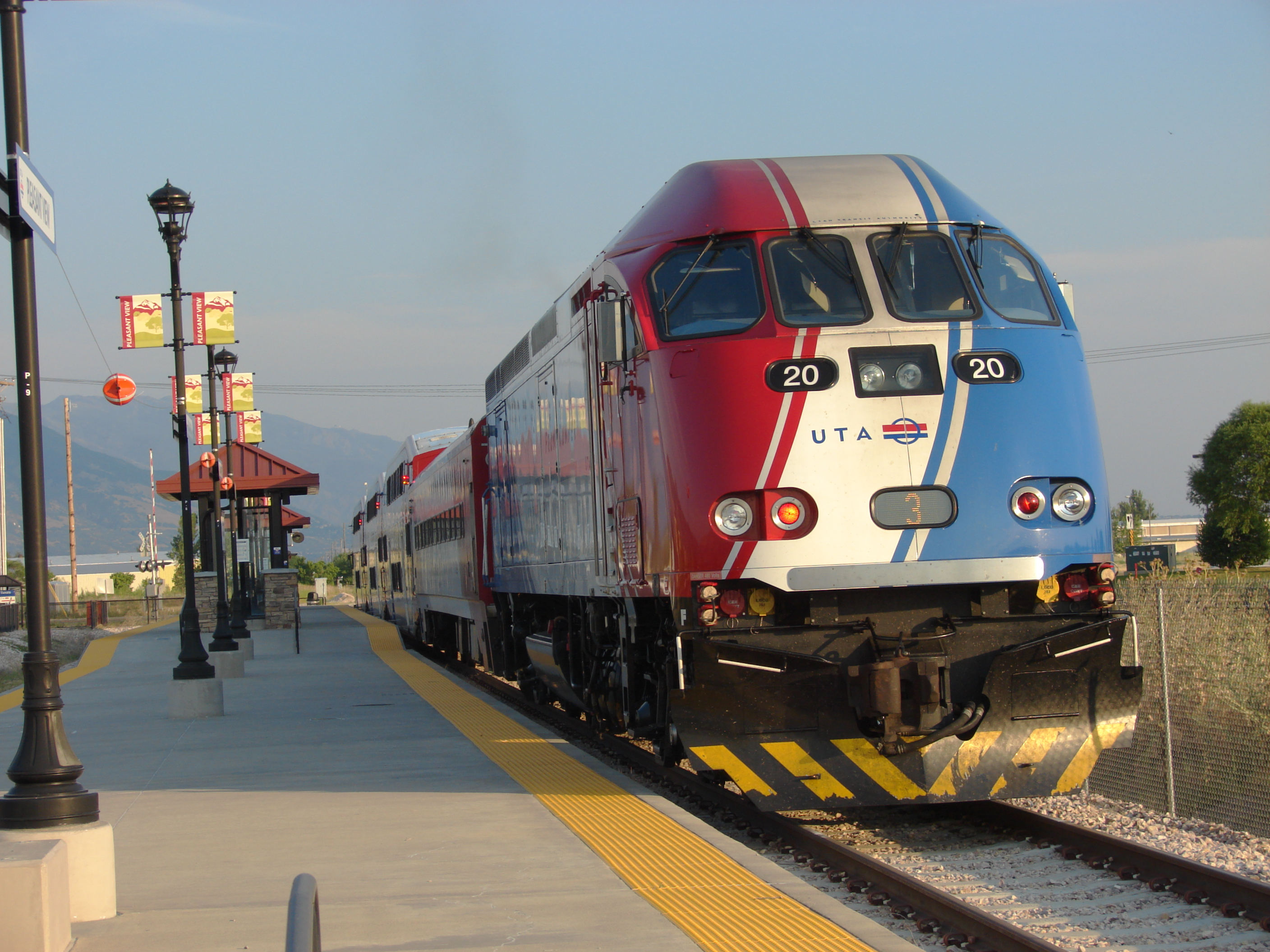
Pleasant View station, the former northern terminus of FrontRunner.

At 1000 North, immediately north of the Business Depot Ogden and immediately west of the tracks, are the Weber County Fairgrounds. From there, FrontRunner continues north, then running along the eastern border of Harrisville it continues its course north and slightly to the west. as it leaves Harrisville and enters the city of Pleasant View. At 2500 North, FrontRunner tracks diverge from the Union Pacific tracks. Further north is the last station and formerly the northern terminus, Pleasant View.

== Fare rates and ridership ==
FrontRunner ridership
	Average weekday boardings	Annual percent change	Reference & notes
Projected	5,830–9,037	– -	
Free demo	30,000 (over 2 days)	– -	
June 2008	5,900	– -	
Q3 2008	7,900	– -	
2008	5,800	– -	
2009	5,300	-3.27%	
2010	5,400	10.10%	
2011	5,800	10.40%	(Note: TRAX Red Line Mid-Jordan extension and Green Line West Valley extension both opened in August 2011)
2012	7,800	14.74%	(Note: FrontRunner South extension opened in December 2012)
2013	14,700	>100%	(Note: TRAX Green Line Airport extension opened in April 2013, Blue Line Draper extension opened in August 2013, and S Line (formerly known as Sugar House Streetcar) opened in December 2013)
2014	16,800	14.3%	
2019	19,200		
2023	14,100	15.66%	
2024	13,600	10.49%	

The current FrontRunner rates are one-way and distance-based. As of February 2026 the base fare is $2.50 (the same as regular bus fare), plus $0.60 per stop thereafter. The maximum fare charged one-way is $9.70. For seniors/disabled/Medicare, the base fare is $1.25, plus $0.30 per stop thereafter with a maximum fare of $4.85. There is also a promotional Group Pass which allows up to four riders of any age to ride together on FrontRunner, TRAX and local buses for $15. The Group Pass is valid starting at 8:30 a.m. and lasts to midnight. Monthly passes valid on FrontRunner, TRAX, local buses, and express buses are available for $198, or $148.50 to students. Agreements set between UTA and several universities (including Utah Valley University, Brigham Young University, and University of Utah) allow current students and faculty to travel on Front-runner fare-free by scanning their ID cards.

== Rolling stock ==
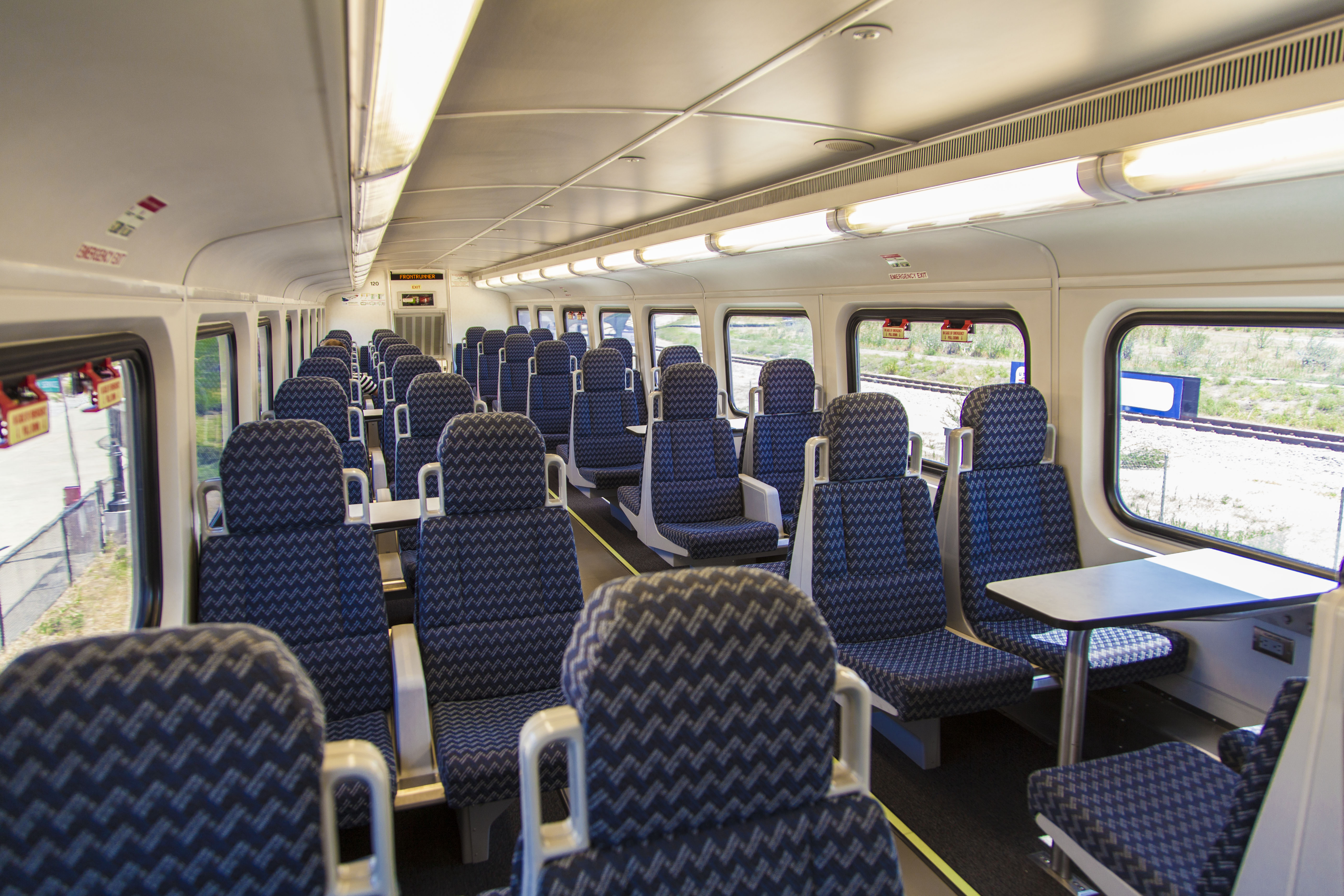
Upper level of a bi-level Bombardier coach. Since this picture was taken, the cloth headrests have been replaced with leather ones and the power outlets have been retrofitted with two 120 V outlets and two USB ports.

FrontRunner uses 18 MPXpress (MP36PH-3C) locomotives from Motive Power International of Boise, Idaho, bi-level Bombardier cars, and had repainted 25 refurbished ex-New Jersey Transit Comet Is which entered service on September 17, 2008. Thirty ex-Metra gallery cars were given to UTA free of charge, but they were determined to be in too poor condition to refurbish, and were scrapped and used for spare parts for the Comet I cars. The Comet I cars were retired on April 18, 2022. The Comet I cars were put up for auction in October 2022, as a condition to receive federal grants to buy replacement cars.

Two months into service, UTA began receiving complaints about the number of bicycles on the trains. The Bombardier cars were designed to hold two bicycles near the rear doors of each train, but up to 15 bicycles per car were reported by some riders. UTA investigated options to increase capacity for bicycles, including more lockers at the stations. In January 2016 FrontRunner upgraded Bombardier Car 206 with new bike racks. The new racks increased the number of racks on a car from 9 to 15.

In 2024, UTA purchased five cars used from Coaster to maintain capacity while the existing fleet was being overhauled.

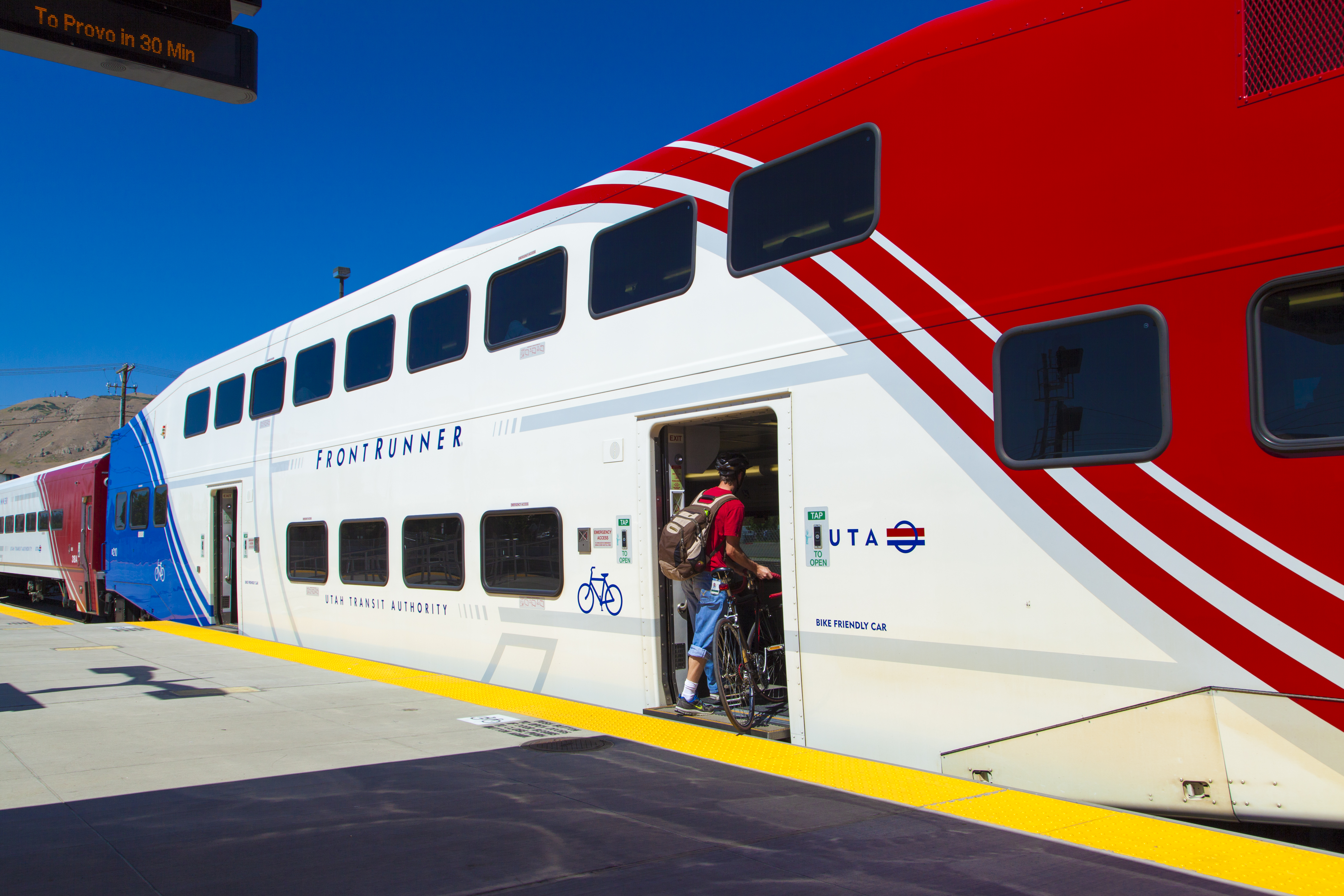
A Bombardier bike-friendly car

A typical FrontRunner trainset is composed of four units: a locomotive, two Bilevel coaches, and a Bilevel Cab Car.

Wi-Fi is available on all FrontRunner cars free of charge.

FrontRunner fleet
Model	Image	Manufactured	Road Numbers	Number in Fleet	Notes
MPI MP36PH-3C locomotives		2007	1–21	18	#13 and #14 were sold to the MBTA in 2011. Another locomotive, #12, was leased to Minnesota's Northstar Line, and subsequently acquired by Northstar in June 2010.
Bombardier Bi-level cab cars		2006	101–122	22	Used to run trains southbound without having to turn the entire train around.
Bombardier Bi-level coaches		2007	201–216	16	Coach Cars. Some equipped with bike racks.

Future FrontRunner fleet
Model	Image	Manufactured	Road Numbers	Number in Fleet	Notes
Bombardier Bi-level coaches		1994	To be determined	5	5 coaches purchased from Coaster. On Coaster, these cars are numbered 2202, 2204, 2205, 2206, and 2207. Delivered to UTA in December 2024.
Stadler FLIRT multiple-unit trainsets		To be determined	To be determined	10-40	At least 10 trainsets will be purchased for the FrontRunner 2X project. With possible expansion up to 40 trainsets. The contract has not been finalized, but Stadler was the only bidder.

Former FrontRunner fleet
Model	Image	Manufactured	Road Numbers	Number in Fleet	Notes
Comet I coaches		1970–1973	301–325	14	Former NJ Transit, built by Pullman Standard for NJDOT, rebuilt by Bombardier Transportation 1987. Retired in April 2022 due to increasing maintenance difficulties.
Pullman-Standard bi-level gallery coaches		1960–1968	(Metra) 8749 & others	30	Acquired from Metra at no charge, deemed to be in too poor shape to refurbish, scrapped for parts for the Comet cars.
EMD GP39 locomotive		1967	901	1	Not used for passenger service. Acquired from Virginia Railway Express. Originally an L&N-owned EMD GP40 was rebuilt into an RP39-2C in 1991. The Locomotive was sold via an auction to New Hope Railroad in July 2024.

=== Maintenance ===
All maintenance for the FrontRunner fleet (locomotives and cars) is provided at the Warm Springs Service Center which is located just west of 500 West at 900 North in Salt Lake City. The Service Center facility, which was purchased from Union Pacific in 2003, was originally built in 1955 at the location of the former Salt Lake City roadhouse. Union Pacific had previously stopped using the facility in 1998 after more than a decade of operating at less than capacity. Following the acquisition from Union Pacific the facility was modified and updated to meet UTA's current needs.

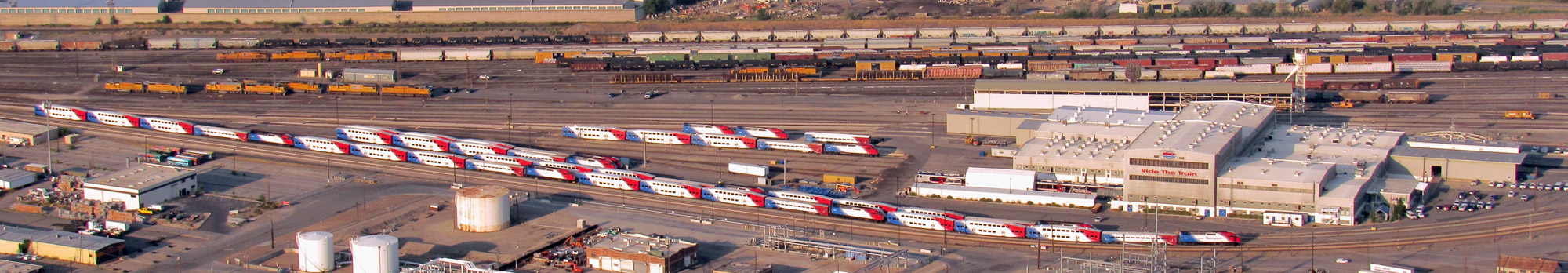
UTA's Warm Springs Service Center is at the right, with FrontRunner trains in the adjacent yard. View from Ensign Peak.

=== Operation ===
FrontRunner trains typically operate with the locomotive on the north end of the train (facing Ogden); cab control cars are used to operate southbound trains.

== Train schedule ==
On weekdays, the first northbound FrontRunner trains to Ogden Central station leave Salt Lake Central station at about 4:15 am and the first northbound trains from Provo Central station leave at about 5:00 am. The first southbound trains (to Provo Central station) leave both Ogden Central and North Temple stations at about 5:00 am. The last southbound train leaves Ogden Central station at 11:09 pm. However, the last northbound train only goes as far as North Temple station. The last southbound train to Provo Central station leaves Ogden Central station at 10:39 pm. However, like the last northbound train, the last southbound train only goes as far as the Salt Lake Central station.

As of December 2, 2018, Friday late night trains run longer than the regular weekdays, but all trains going northbound terminate at North Temple. Same type of situation as southbound, except southbound terminates at Salt Lake Central station.

On Saturdays the first southbound train leaves North Temple station at about 6:00 am and the first northbound train leaves Salt Lake Central station at about 6:45 am. The first northbound train leaves Provo Central station at about 7:45 am and the first southbound train leaves Ogden Central station at about 8:15 am. The last southbound train leaves Ogden Central station at 1:09 am (Sunday morning) and the last northbound train leaves Provo Central station at 1:20 am (Sunday morning). However, the last three trains only goes as far as either Salt Lake Central station, going southbound, or North Temple station going northbound. The last northbound train to Ogden Central station leaves Provo Central station at 10:50 pm and the last southbound train to Provo Central station leaves Ogden Central station at 10:09 pm.

FrontRunner runs every hour Monday through Saturday, with additional runs on the half hour for the weekday morning and evening commutes. FrontRunner also does special trips for big events in Salt Lake City and the surrounding community. As of December 2024, the FrontRunner still does not run on Sundays or major holidays.

== Stations ==
Key
†	Temporarily closed

Station	County	Municipality	Year Opened	Ridership (average boardings)	Major connections and notes
Pleasant View†	Weber	Pleasant View	2008	Temporarily closed	Service suspended August 12, 2018; expected to resume in the future. Park & Ride: ~300 spaces
Ogden	Weber	Ogden	2008	1144	Ogden Express; Greyhound Lines; Park & Ride: 476 spaces
Roy	Weber	Roy	2008	373	Park & Ride: 502 spaces
Clearfield	Davis	Clearfield	2008	541	Park & Ride: 561 spaces
Layton	Davis	Layton	2008	519	Park & Ride: 383 spaces
Farmington	Davis	Farmington	2008	382	Park & Ride: 874 spaces
Woods Cross	Davis	Woods Cross	2008	458	Park & Ride: 235 spaces
North Temple	Salt Lake	Salt Lake City	2012	2296	Green Line
Salt Lake Central	Salt Lake	Salt Lake City	2008	1038	Blue Line; Amtrak; Greyhound Lines
Murray Central	Salt Lake	Murray	2012	1485	Blue Line; Red Line; Midvalley Express; Park & Ride: 345 spaces
South Jordan	Salt Lake	South Jordan	2012	633	Park & Ride: 577 spaces
Draper	Salt Lake	Draper	2012	585	Park & Ride: 600 spaces
Lehi	Utah	Lehi	2012	1091	Park & Ride: 739 spaces
American Fork	Utah	American Fork	2012	631	Park & Ride: 553 spaces
Vineyard	Utah	Vineyard	2022	393	Park & Ride: 108 spaces
Orem Central	Utah	Orem	2012	1217	Utah Valley Express; Park & Ride: 498 spaces
Provo Central	Utah	Provo	2012	1816	Utah Valley Express; Amtrak; Greyhound Lines; Park & Ride: 811 spaces

== Notable incidents ==
On January 24, 2017, a FrontRunner train impacted the front trailer of a FedEx double semi-trailer truck at a North Salt Lake crossing. The impact was of sufficient force to crush and split the trailer and fling its contents down the tracks. The crossing lights and gates did not operate during the train's approach so there was no warning to vehicles in the crossing. Furthermore, snow and ice were present at the time of the accident limiting visibility. There were no significant injuries in the accident. A police cruiser was in the opposite lane near the crossing with its dash camera active. The accident video was released to the media and quickly became popular. UTA investigated the incident and fired an employee after determining he had improperly raised the gates without following procedures that would have made the crossing safe.

On October 16, 2019, a FrontRunner train impacted an idle car on the tracks and threw it 30 ft (9.1 m) after its driver experienced a medical incident and fell unconscious. At the time, the train was traveling approximately 80 mph (130 km/h) before emergency brakes were activated 3/4 mile (1 1/4 km) ahead of the blockade by train operator Riley Nelson. The unconscious driver was pulled from the car moments before the train hit by Utah Highway Patrol Trooper Ruben Correa, who encountered the situation while on routine patrol. The train was still moving at around 30 mph (50 km/h) upon impact. Both the driver and the State Trooper's lives being saved was attributed to the FrontRunner being five minutes behind schedule and the operator's quick reaction.

On February 4, 2025, a FrontRunner train impacted an SUV at 1000 South on Hill Field Road in Layton after the SUV was rear ended by a pickup truck into the crossing after being stopped behind the crossing. The SUV driver made an attempt to back up out of the crossing but stopped shortly after impacting the crossing arm. The driver left the vehicle moments before collision. Videos from 1000 South and on board the train was released on KSL the next week and quickly went viral on the internet, making it one of the most viewed videos of FrontRunner.

== See also ==
- Transportation in Salt Lake City
- TRAX
