= Orem Central station =

Commuter rail station in Utah, USA

Orem Central
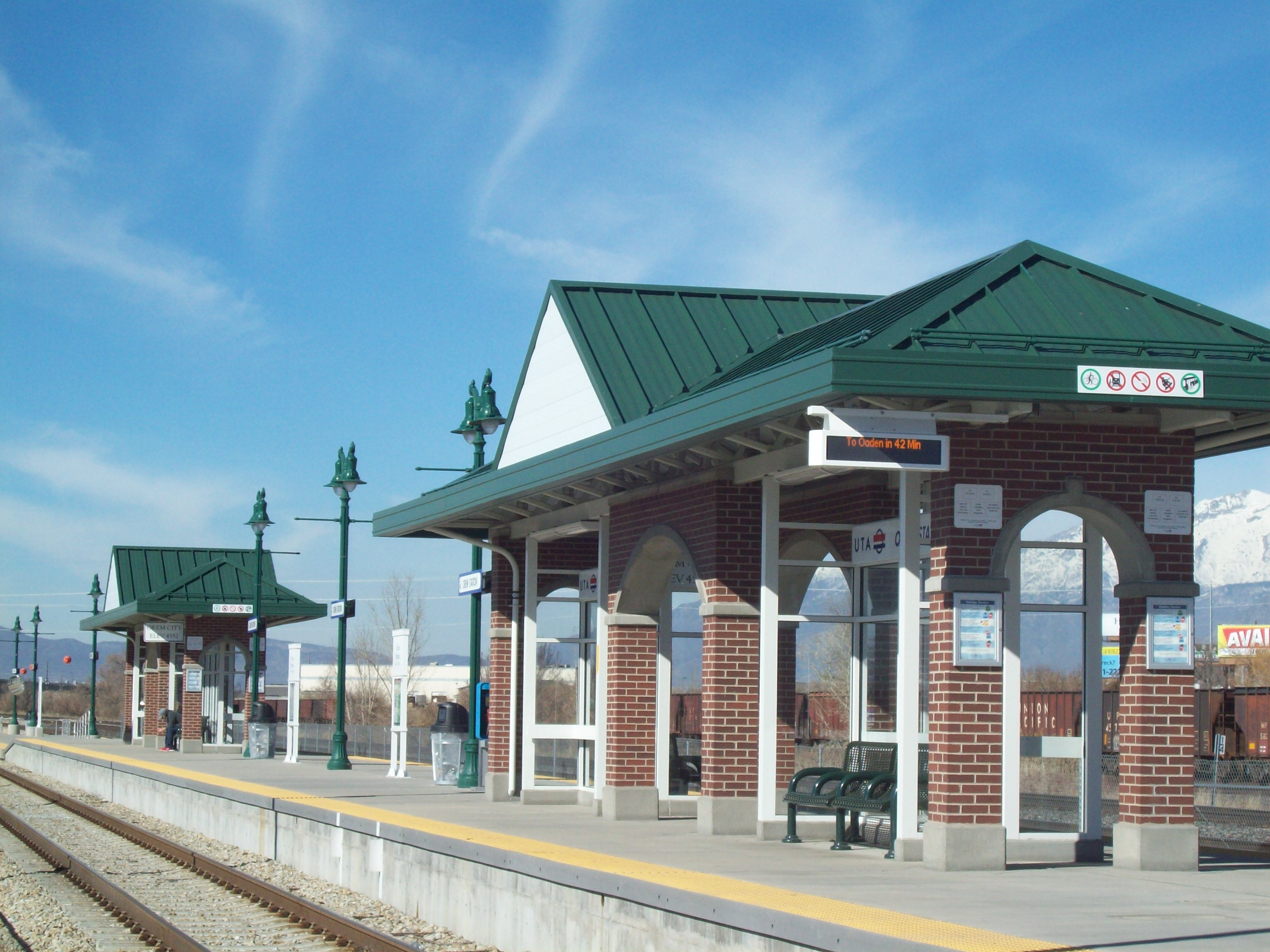
- Orem Central station platform

General information
- Location: 900 South 1350 West; Orem, Utah; United States
- Coordinates: 40°16′50″N 111°43′33″W
- Owner: Utah Transit Authority (UTA)
- Platforms: 1 island platform
- Tracks: 2
- Connections: UTA: 830X (UVX), 831, 862

Construction
- Parking: 498 spaces
- Accessible: Yes

History
- Opened: December 10, 2012; 13 years ago

Services
Preceding station	Utah Transit Authority	Following station
Vineyard toward Ogden Central	FrontRunner	Provo Central Terminus
Location

Orem Central station is an intermodal transportation station in Orem, Utah. It is served by the Utah Transit Authority's (UTA) FrontRunner train, which operates along the Wasatch Front with service from Ogden to Provo. Local bus lines and the Utah Valley Express also service the station. The station is also referred to as Orem Intermodal Center, Orem Central Station, or Orem CRST by UTA. It is part of the FrontRunner South extension.

== Description ==
The station is located at 900 South 1350 West, with access from I-15 by way of the University Parkway (SR-265). The majority of the Utah Valley University main campus is located on the opposites side of I-15. The station has a Park and Ride lot with nearly 500 free parking spaces available. The bus bays are accented with green neon lights at night due to its proximity to UVU. The station is located within the Quiet Zone, so trains do not routinely sound their horns when approaching public crossings within this corridor. The station opened, along with the rest of the FrontRunner South, on December 10, 2012 and is operated by Utah Transit Authority.

The Orem FrontRunner Station is the main part of the Orem Intermodal Center. UTA refers to it as an intermodal center because it operates the northern terminus of UVX bus rapid transit (BRT) line that connects the station to Provo Central Station. Originally there were plans to construction an actual station building (similar to Ogden Central station), however, as of August 2013, there is no indication that any work on the anticipated building will begin anytime in the near future.

== Future plans ==
Phase 1 of the Orem Intermodal Center which includes the FrontRunner station, the local and intra-county bus stops, and the Park and Ride lot. Phase 2 which was completed fully by January 2019, included accommodations for UVX including four bays for articulated buses as well as mixed-use, transit oriented development (TOD). In June 2018, ground was broken for a pedestrian bridge from the station to UVU. Construction did not begin until November 2019 following a cost-cutting redesign and Union Pacific approval. The bridge opened in 2021 and runs from the south end of the station platform to the parking lot in between the UCCU Center and the Hal Wing Track and Field complex.
