= Farmington station =

Commuter rail station in Farmington, Utah, US

Farmington
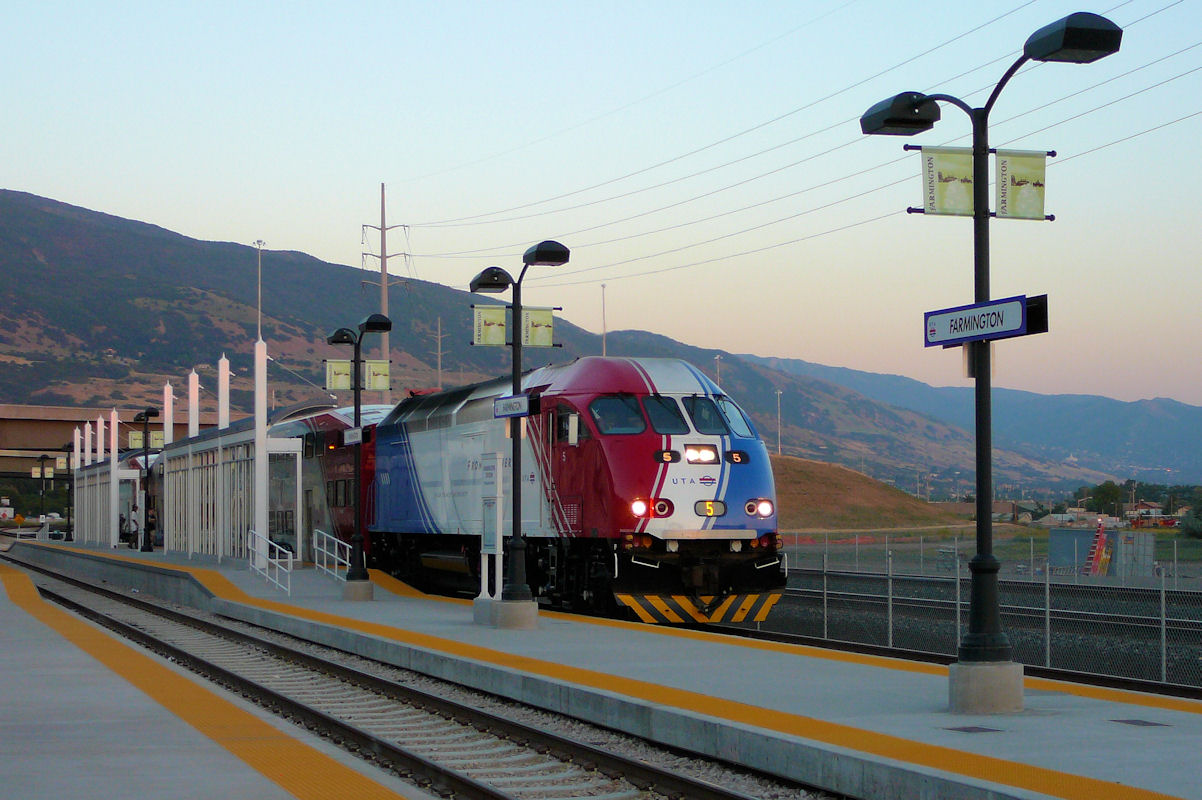
- Farmington station platform

General information
- Location: 450 North 850 West; Farmington, Utah; United States
- Coordinates: 40°59′17″N 111°54′17″W
- Owner: Utah Transit Authority (UTA)
- Platforms: 1 side platform, 1 island platform
- Tracks: 2
- Connections: UTA: 455, 473, 667

Construction
- Parking: 874 spaces
- Accessible: Yes

History
- Opened: April 26, 2008; 18 years ago

Services
Preceding station	Utah Transit Authority	Following station
Layton toward Ogden Central	FrontRunner	Woods Cross toward Provo Central
Location

Farmington station is a commuter rail station in Farmington, Utah, United States served by the FrontRunner, Utah Transit Authority's (UTA) commuter rail train that operates along the Wasatch Front with service from Ogden in central Weber County through Davis County, Salt Lake City, and Salt Lake County to Provo in central Utah County.

== Description ==
The station is located immediately west of the I-15/US-89/Legacy Parkway (SR-67)/Park Lane (SR-225) interchanges. The official address of the station, according to UTA is 450 N 850 West, but it is actually located at the south end of Station Parkway. Station Parkway is accessed by turning southeast off Park Lane (this section of the street is also known as North 1100 West) and then following Station Parkway through the roundabout. Park Lane is accessed from either I-15 or US-89 southbound by way of the appropriate Park Lane interchange. From northbound I-15 the Station is accessed by way of the US-89 northbound exit and then the Park Lane interchange on US-89.

The station is located on approximately 17 acres (69,000 m^{2}) of land and is part of the Station Park commercial development. Since Union Pacific Railroad tracks run northwest to southeast between the FrontRunner platform and the parking lot for the station, the use of a pedestrian bridge is necessary to cross over the tracks. The top of this bridge, and its red roof, is readily visible from I-15. The station has a free Park and Ride lot with about 870 parking spaces available. The station is located within the Quiet Zone, so trains do not routinely sound their horns when approaching public crossings within this corridor.

== History ==
The inaugural FrontRunner train departed the station southbound at 10:30 am on April 26, 2008.

=== December 2011 wind storm ===
In the early morning hours of December 1, 2011 a major wind storm passed through Davis County. The storm caused an overall estimated $20 million in property damages within Davis County. UTA reported began reporting problems at Farmington station at about 6:15 am, with train service to the station being curtailed shortly thereafter. UTA later reported, "Record breaking winds of more than 100 mph..." causing severe damage to Farmington station. UTA also stated that, even though "FrontRunner trains are designed to withstand winds of even greater strength...", damage to the station was so severe that trains could not operate safely through the area until mid-afternoon. Much of the most visible damage was to light poles on the passenger platform and in the parking lot. A "bus bridge" was used to ferry passengers between the Layton and Salt Lake Central stations while repairs were made. Although train service resumed by 3:00 pm, Farmington station remained closed through the weekend while repairs to the station were completed.

== Station Park ==
Station Park is transit-oriented commercial development that was planned specifically in conjunction with the construction of Farmington station and is located south of the station. It is intended to be similar to The Gateway in Salt Lake City, only bigger. A 62-acre (250,000 m^{2}) shopping center is within walking distance of Farmington station, featuring a 16-screen Cinemark movie theater and stores such as Apple, Best Buy, Barnes & Noble, Cost Plus World Market, Forever 21, H&M, Harmons, HomeGoods, Marshalls, Nike Factory Store, Nordstrom Rack, Old Navy, Ross Stores, Petco, REI, and ULTA Beauty. There is also a Hyatt Place hotel, sixty shops and about 10 restaurants, and office space for lease. Residential facilities will also be included in Station Park upon completion.
