= Vineyard station (FrontRunner) =

Commuter rail station in Vineyard, Utah, US

Vineyard
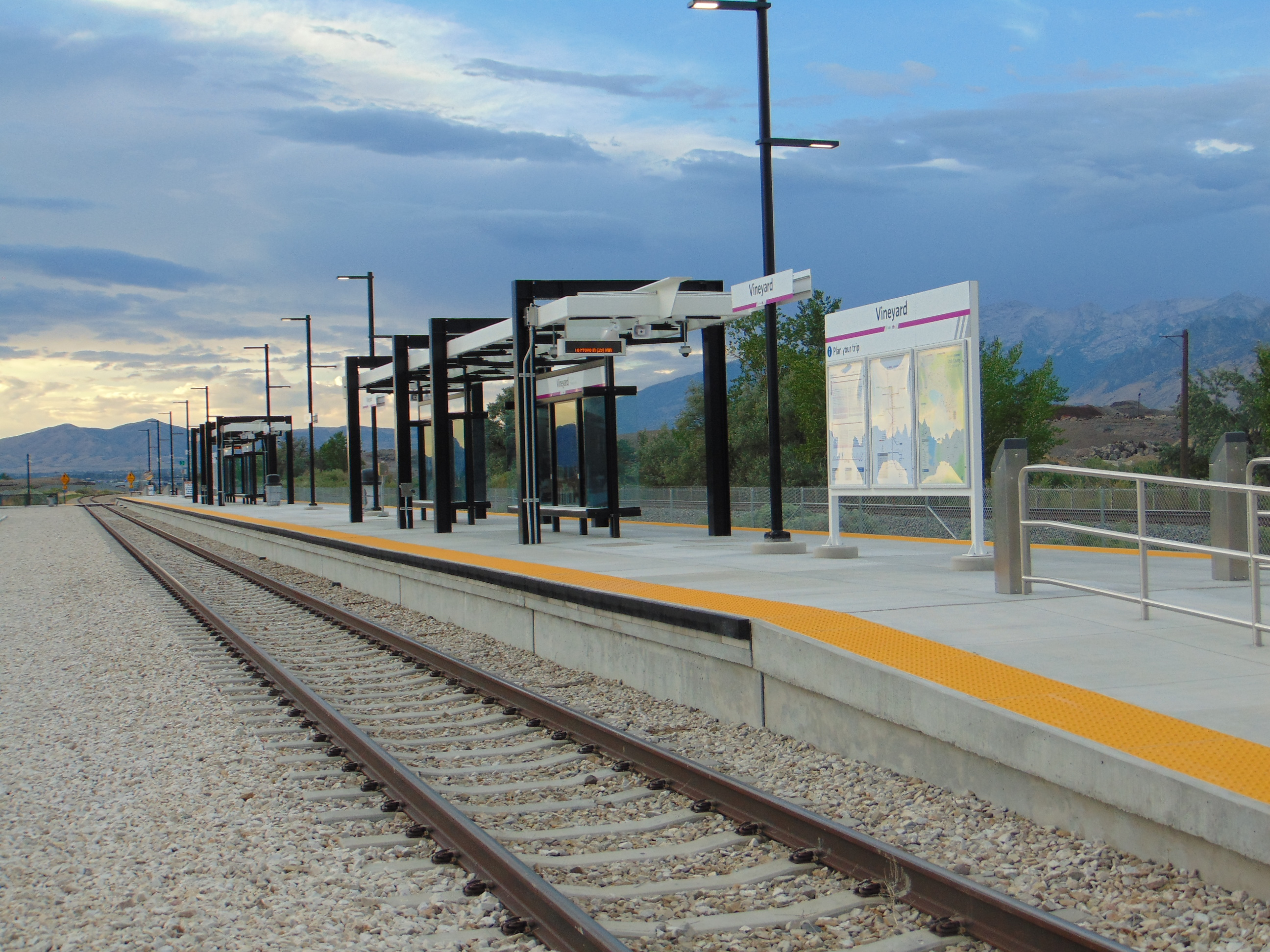
- Vineyard station platform shortly after opening in August 2022

General information
- Location: 130 East Market Street; Vineyard, Utah; United States
- Coordinates: 40°18′36″N 111°45′00″W
- Owner: Utah Transit Authority
- Platforms: 1 island platform
- Tracks: 2
- Connections: UTA: 834

Construction
- Structure type: At-grade
- Parking: 108
- Accessible: Yes

History
- Opened: August 12, 2022; 4 years ago

Services
Preceding station	Utah Transit Authority	Following station
American Fork toward Ogden Central	FrontRunner	Orem toward Provo Central
Location

Vineyard station is a commuter rail station in Vineyard, Utah, United States, served by the Utah Transit Authority (UTA)'s FrontRunner service.

== History ==
Vineyard was built as an infill station on the FrontRunner South line to serve the namesake city of Vineyard. At the time of the station’s completion, Vineyard was the fastest-growing community in Utah. The station construction project was initially allotted $4 million by the Utah Legislature in 2018, but before construction began, the UTA determined that it would be necessary to install 1.8 miles (2.9 km) double-track through and north of the station. In 2021, the additional funding needed for the double-tracking was secured with $1.6 million coming from the state legislature and $16.9 million being contributed by the UTA. A groundbreaking ceremony was held on May 13, 2021.

During construction, the FrontRunner South line had to be closed on several occasions to allow crews to add railroad switches and pour the concrete platform. The station is located at 130 East Market Street (along the joint FrontRunner South and Union Pacific rail corridor) just north of Vineyard Connector Road (Utah State Route 176).

The opening of the station was originally expected to take place in spring 2022, but was delayed by several months because of changes to the design of the intersection of Main Street and Vineyard Connector Road to accommodate unforeseen growth within Vineyard. The station officially opened on August 12, 2022.

The station has a park and ride lot, with the number of parking spaces yet to be announced.
