= Provo Central station =

Commuter rail station in Provo, Utah, United States

Provo Central
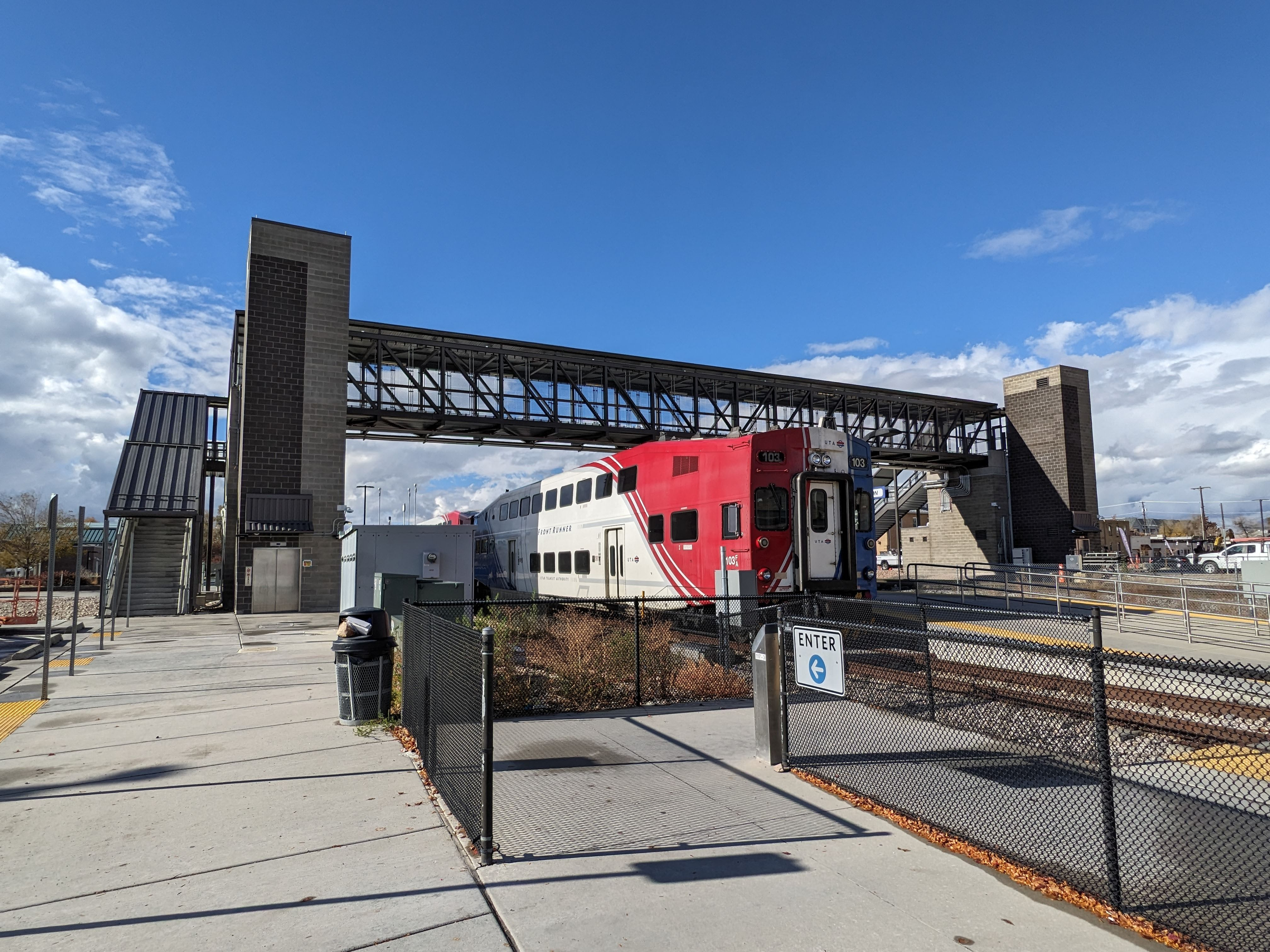
- Provo Central station platform

General information
- Location: 701 South Freedom Boulevard; Provo, Utah; United States
- Coordinates: 40°13′32″N 111°39′39″W
- Owner: Utah Transit Authority (UTA)
- Platforms: 1 island platform
- Tracks: 2
- Connections: UTA: 830X (UVX), 805, 821, 831, 833, 834, 850; Amtrak: California Zephyr (at Provo station); Salt Lake Express

Construction
- Parking: 811 spaces
- Cycle facilities: Short-term and Long-term (lockers)
- Accessible: Yes

History
- Opened: December 10, 2012; 13 years ago

Services
Preceding station	Utah Transit Authority	Following station
Orem toward Ogden Central	FrontRunner	Terminus
Location

Provo Central station is an intermodal transit station in Provo, Utah, United States. It is served by the Utah Transit Authority's (UTA) FrontRunner commuter rail line as well as local, intra-county, and interstate buses. It is the southern terminus of the commuter rail system, with service running north as far as Ogden. The station is also known as Provo Intermodal Hub, Provo Station, or Provo CRS. It is part of the FrontRunner South extension.

== Description ==
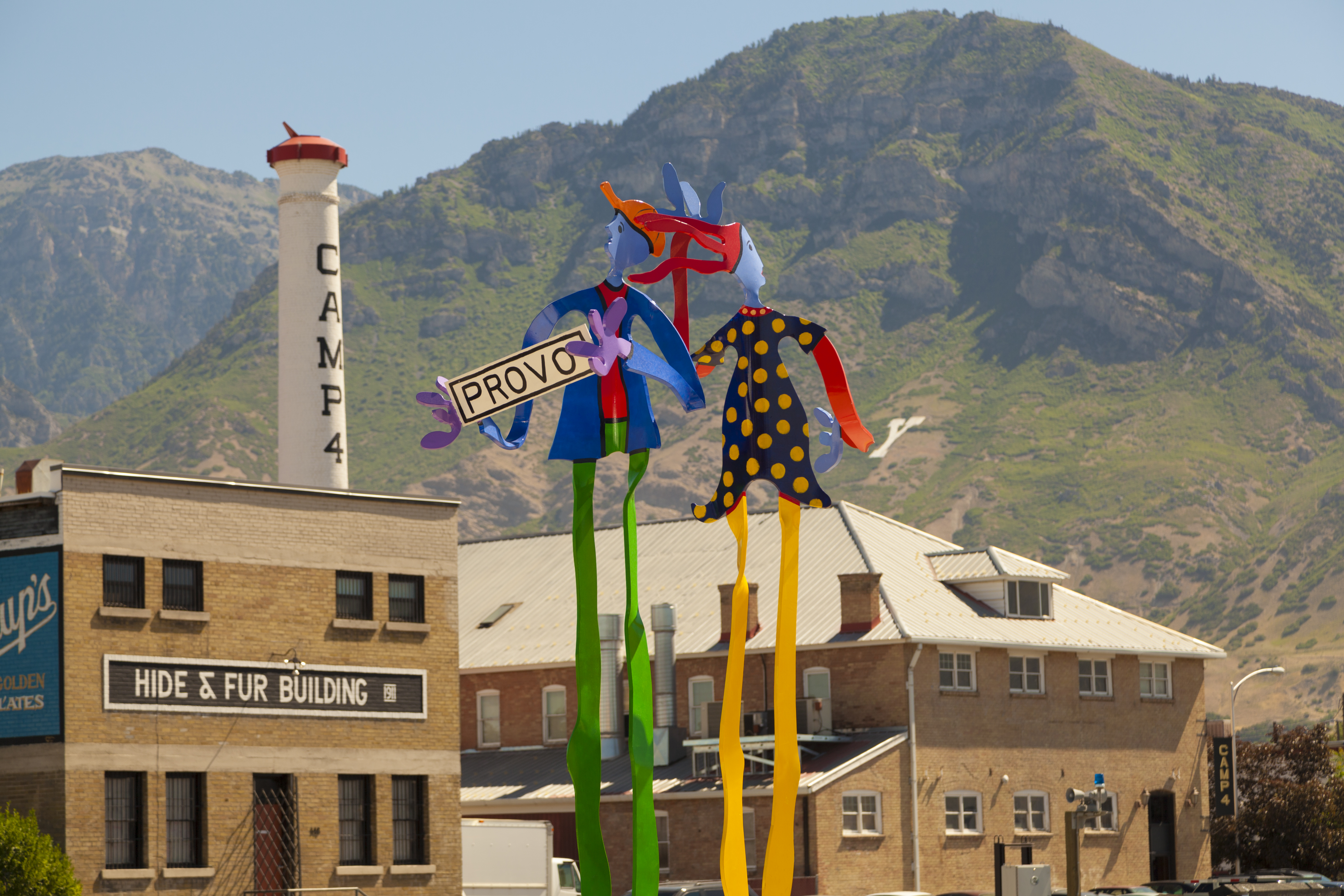
Art at the Provo station

The station is at 690 South University Avenue U.S. Route 189 on 15 acres and covers a two city block area between Freedom Boulevard (200 West) and University Avenue. It is accessed from I-15 by way of either the University Avenue or Provo Center Street (SR 114) interchanges.

The station has a Park and Ride lot with over 800 free parking spaces available. The station is one block east of the Provo Amtrak station, which is a stop for the California Zephyr. While there are several retail business (including fast food restaurants) just south of the station, it is within walking distance of downtown Provo. The station is within the Quiet Zone, so all trains (including Amtrak's and Union Pacific's) do not routinely sound their horns when approaching public crossings within this corridor. The station opened, along with the rest of FrontRunner South, on December 10, 2012 and is operated by Utah Transit Authority.

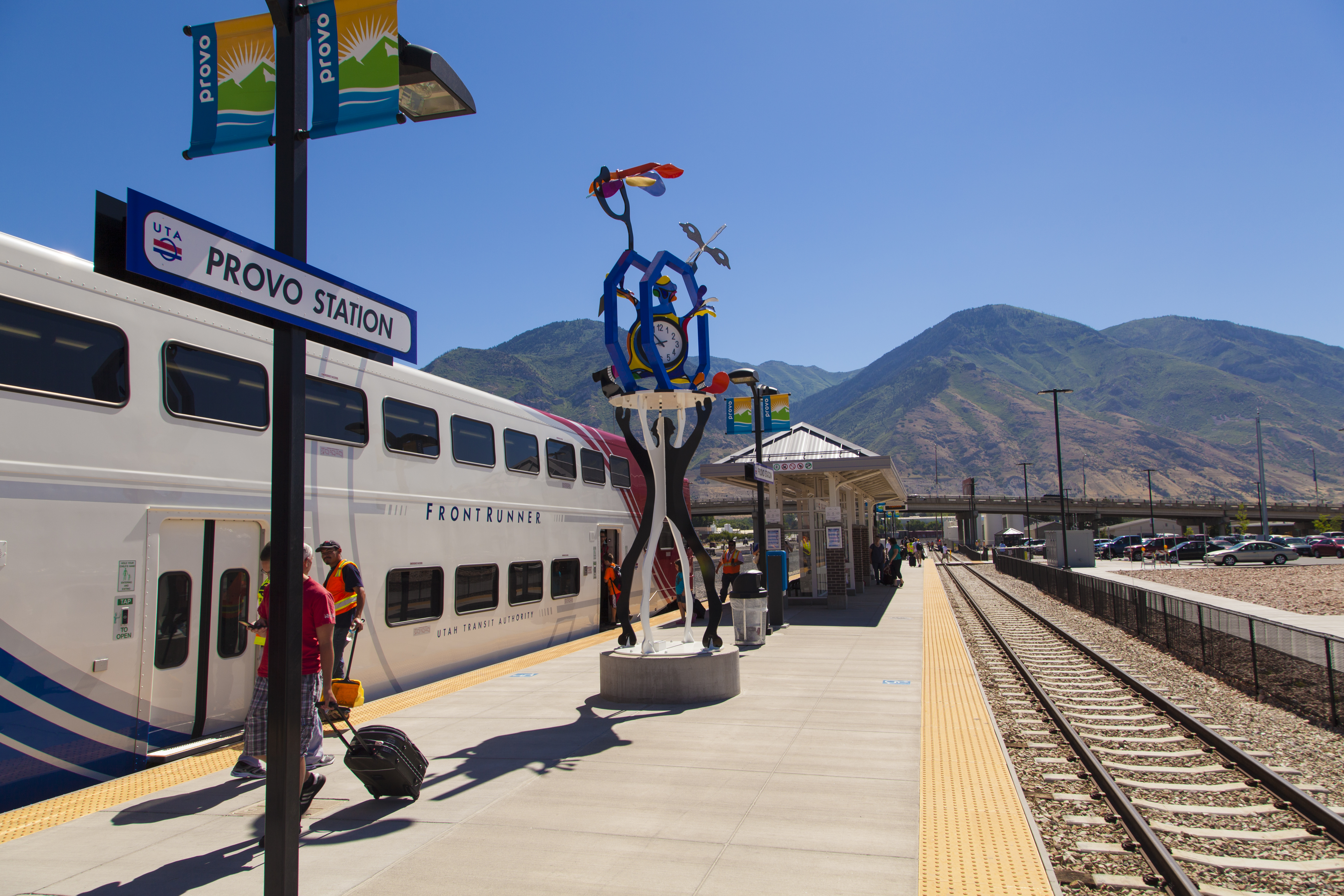
The station as it appeared before construction of the pedestrian bridge.

The Provo FrontRunner Station is the main part of the Provo Intermodal Center. UTA refers to it as an intermodal center because of the Utah Valley Express (UVX) BRT transfer station just south of the rail platform. UVX connects the station with Orem Central station by way of BYU and UVU.

== Future ==
Having completed Phase One of the Provo Intermodal Center which includes the FrontRunner station, the local and intra-county bus stops, and the Park and Ride lot, UTA completed Phase Two in 2018 and anticipates to have Phase Three complete a few years after that. Phase Two included accommodations for UVX as well as a parking structure, built on the northeast corner of the Park and Ride lot and adjacent to the University Avenue viaduct. Phase Three is anticipated to include mixed-use, transit oriented development (TOD). However, unlike the TOD at other stations (such as Station Park at the Farmington station), UTA plans to include these facilities within the confines of the intermodal center, rather than just close by.
