= Utah Transit Authority bus rapid transit =

Bus rapid transit services operated by the Utah Transit Authority

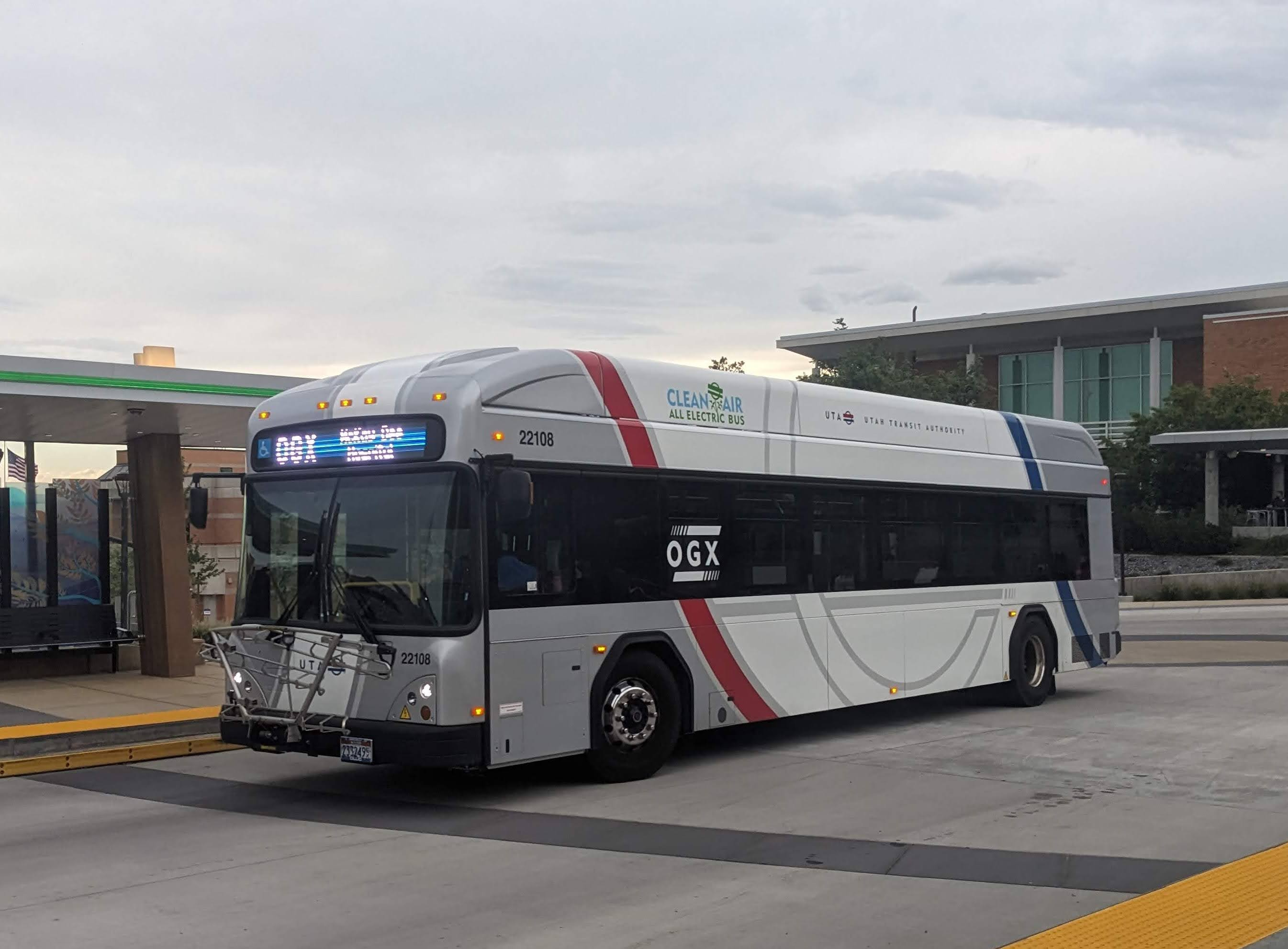
- An Ogden Express (OGX) bus at Weber State Central, September 2023
- Parent: Utah Transit Authority (UTA)
- Founded: July 14, 2008
- Locale: Wasatch Front, Utah, U.S.
- Routes: Utah Valley Express; Ogden Express; Midvalley Express (under construction); Davis-SLC Community Connector (planned); 5600 West BRT (planned); 3500 South MAX (discontinued)
- Hubs: Murray Central station; Ogden Central station; Orem Central station; Provo Central station; West Valley Central station
- Website: rideuta.com

The Utah Transit Authority (UTA) operates three bus rapid transit (BRT) services along the Wasatch Front in Utah, United States. It is described by UTA as "light rail on rubber tires." As of April 2026, an additional two routes are planned and one has been discontinued.

== Description ==
BRT has service improvements that differed from regular bus service, such as Transit Signal Priority (TSP), increased spacing between stops, high-frequency service, and improved stops. BRT lines had limited stops (often at major transfer points). (Note: Many "stops" or stations on a BRT line actually consist of two separate stations, one for each direction of travel, usually on opposite sides of the road and sometimes on opposite sides of an intersection. On sections of the line where BRT has dedicated travel lanes (guideways), the stations are located in the median of the road.) UTA BRT lines typically contain limited fixed guideway segments. The first such fixed guideway was built for the MAX service in West Valley City on 3500 South from 3600 West to 2700 West.

Another characteristic that distinguishes BRT from regular bus service is that it did not have a set schedule for all of its stops (although there are estimated times for arrival). BRT routes would leave their first stops and travel as fast as legally and safely possible to the end of the line.

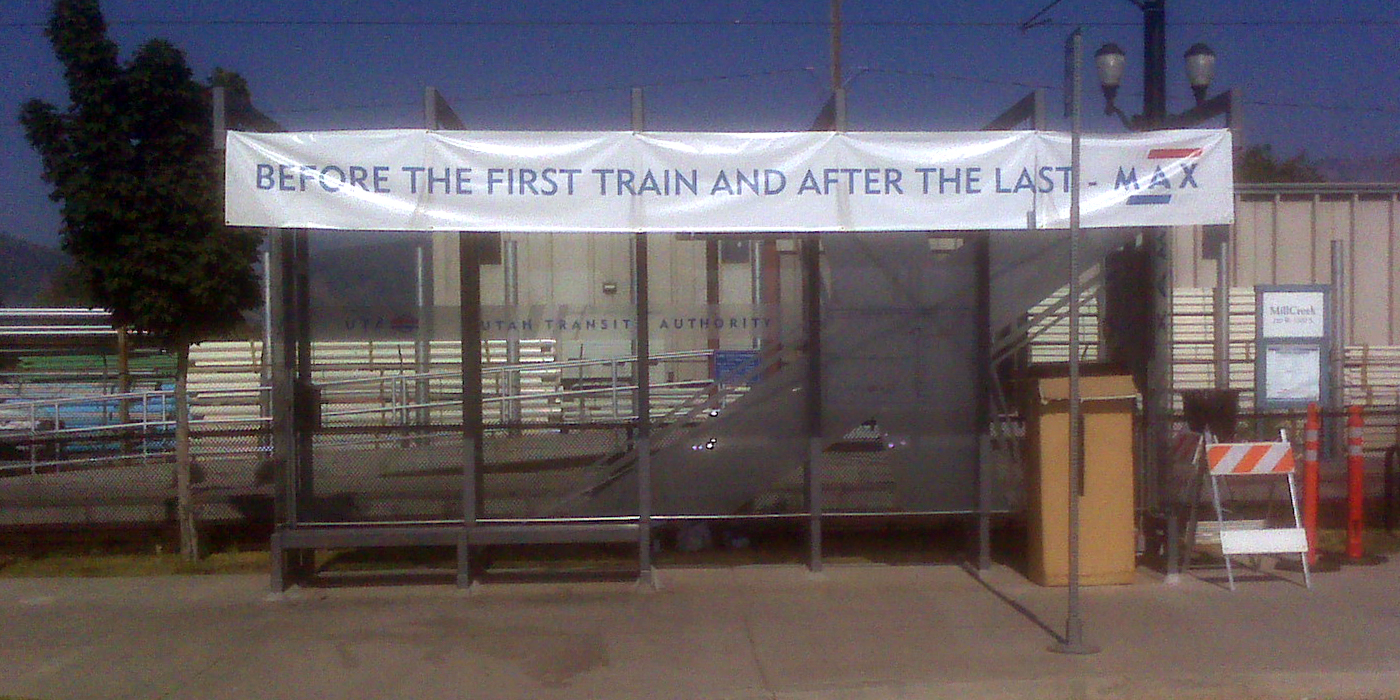
The MAX bus shelter at the Millcreek TRAX station, July 2008

The first BRT line (3500 South MAX) opened on July 14, 2008. The service was discontinued on August 7, 2022.

Another feature of BRT is that passengers could enter vehicles by any door and do not have to show proof of fare to the driver upon boarding. Fare payments are made via transfers from other services, Ticket Vending Machines at select stops, and via card readers present on platforms. Fares were never truly enforced as they were on the TRAX and FrontRunner.

=== MAX ===
MAX (Note: The meaning and origins of the name "MAX" was never identified or specified by UTA (as it has in the case of TRAX, which is a shortened version of "Transit Express"). However, the term MAX, as a shortening of Metropolitan (or Metro) Area Express, has been used in conjunction with bus rapid transit (BRT) since June 2004 by the Metropolitan Area Express in the Las Vegas Valley in Nevada and since July 2005 by the Metro Area Express in Kansas City, Missouri) was the former branding used by UTA to describe their BRT services. Only 1 line, 3500 South MAX, ever used this branding, however, several planned lines used MAX, such as UVX (Provo-Orem MAX), MVX (Murray-Taylorsville MAX), or 5600 West BRT (5600 West MAX). Over 80 miles of MAX routes were planned at one point.

MAX had several unique features that distinguish itself from the current BRT system. It's fixed guideway segment was much more limited than future projects, with only 2 stations and mostly running single tracked. All MAX stations also had ticket vending machines, whereas services like UVX only plan to install ticket vending machines at the busiest stations, relying on fare cards and transfers from other services.

=== Current BRT lines ===
==== Utah Valley Express ====
Utah Valley Express (UVX) is a BRT line that connects the Provo Central and Orem Central FrontRunner stations via Brigham Young University and Utah Valley University. UVX opened on January 9, 2019, traveling a route of 11 miles (18 km) with 5 miles (8.0 km) of dedicated lanes. UVX runs Monday through Friday from about 4:00 am to 1:00 am and about 5:30 to 1:00 am on Saturday (every 6–10 minutes at peak times and every 15 minutes off-peak and on Saturdays).

==== Ogden Express ====
Ogden Express (OGX) is a BRT line that connects the Ogden Central FrontRunner station with the McKay-Dee Hospital, running through Weber State University and downtown Ogden. OGX opened on August 20, 2023, traveling a route of 5.3 miles (8.5 km) with around 2 miles (3.2 km) of dedicated lanes. OGX runs 7 days a week from about 4:30 am to 12:15 am on weekdays, about 8:30 am to 11:15 pm on Saturdays, and about 9:00 am to 7:00 pm on Sundays (every 10 minutes on Weekdays, 15 minutes on Saturdays and every 30 minutes on Sundays).

==== Midvalley Express ====
Midvalley Express (MVX) is a BRT line that connects the Murray Central and West Valley Central stations, running through the Salt Lake Community College campus in Taylorsville. MVX entered service on April 12, 2026, traveling a route of about 7 miles (11 km) with around one mile (1.6 km) of dedicated lanes. MVX runs 7 days a week from 4:00 am to 12:45 Monday through Saturday and from about 5:45 am to 9:45 pm on Sundays (every 15 minutes Monday through Saturday, and every 30 minutes on Sunday).

=== Future BRT lines ===
There are several BRT lines under study, planned, or under construction in the UTA Service Area.

==== Davis-SLC Community Connector ====
The Davis-SLC Community Connector is proposed to link Farmington FrontRunner station in Davis County with the University of Utah's Research Park. Planned to open to 2028/2029, it will have transit signal priority within downtown Salt Lake City. However, no dedicated lanes will be built along its approximately 26-mile (42 km) long route. Initial service plans envision this route to come every 15 minutes during daytime hours and every 30 minutes during early mornings and late evenings.

=== Former BRT lines ===
==== 3500 South MAX ====
The 3500 South MAX line connected Magna with the West Valley Central TRAX Station in West Valley City and the Millcreek TRAX station in South Salt Lake, traveling along a route of 10 miles (16 km) on 3500 and 3300 South (SR-171). It was the first of several BRT lines that UTA is planning for the Salt Lake Valley and Utah County. Costs for the project totaled $17 million (equivalent to $25,421,000 in 2025); a light rail extension along the same route would have cost $100 million. Original plans were to discontinue MAX service between the Millcreek and West Valley Central TRAX Stations once the West Valley extension of the TRAX Green Line was completed. However, even though the Green Line began service in August 2011, as of May 2014, service between the two TRAX stations still continued. The 3500 South MAX ran Monday through Saturday (no Sunday service) from about 6:00 am to midnight (every fifteen minutes on weekdays and every half-hour on Saturdays). It was permanently discontinued on August 7, 2022, after a year of temporary suspension caused by the COVID-19 pandemic.
