= Ogden Express =

Bus rapid transit line in Ogden, Utah, US

Ogden Express (OGX)

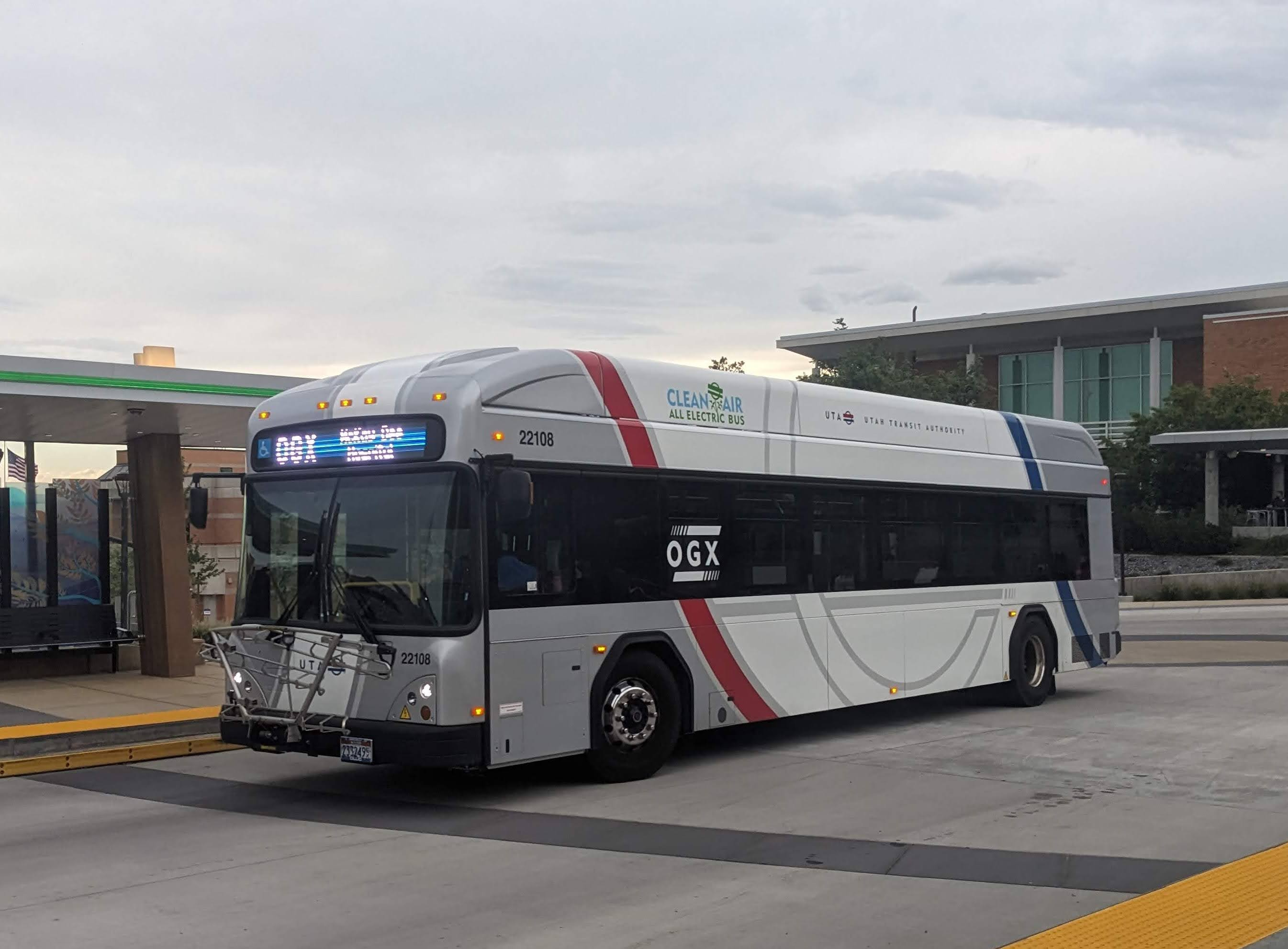
- An OGX bus at Weber State Central, September 2023

Overview
- Other name: Ogden/WSU BRT (during planning)
- Owner: Utah Transit Authority (UTA)
- Locale: Ogden, Utah; United States
- Termini: Ogden Central station; McKay-Dee Hospital
- Stations: 13

Service
- Type: Bus rapid transit (BRT)
- System: Utah Transit Authority bus rapid transit
- Route number: 603X
- Depot: Ogden
- Rolling stock: Gillig Low Floor Plus (battery electric)

History
- Opened: August 20, 2023; August 29, 2022 (Wildcat Shuttle)

Technical
- Line length: 5.3 mi (8.5 km)
- Character: At-grade
- Operating speed: 40 mph (64 km/h) (maximum posted speed limit)

Ogden Express (OGX) is a 5.3-mile (8.5 km) bus rapid transit (BRT) line in southern Ogden, Utah. United States. The line is operated by the Utah Transit Authority (UTA) and runs between Ogden Central station (FrontRunner station) and the McKay-Dee Hospital, via Weber State University (WSU). OGX is the third of UTA's BRT lines along the Wasatch Front, and officially opened on August 20, 2023.

== Description ==
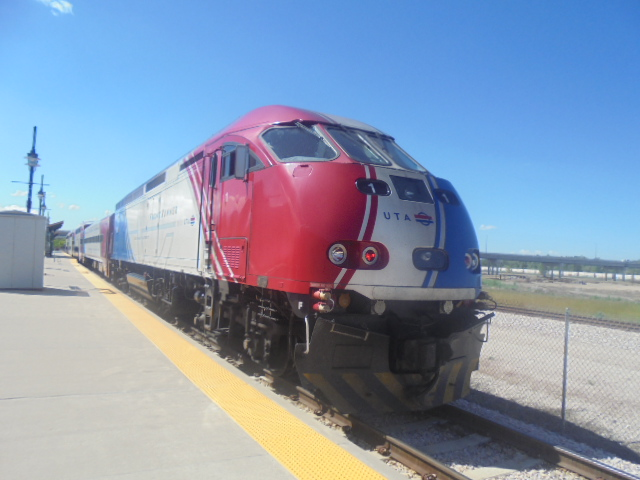
Utah Transit Authority FrontRunner locomotive at Ogden Central station, May 2017

OGX connects Ogden Central station with Lindquist Field, The Junction, the Ogden/Weber Municipal Building, downtown Ogden, Ogden High School, Weber State University (including the Dee Events Center), and McKay-Dee Hospital. Much of the route runs along Harrison Boulevard (Utah State Route 203). UTA had anticipated having the Ogden Express operational by 2020, but by late May 2020, construction was not expected to even begin until fall of the same year. The same as its predecessor (the Utah Valley Express), OGX will be free to ride for at least the first three years of operation, though this period was extended another two years in 2026.

OGX connects with the FrontRunner at Ogden Central station (formerly known as the Ogden Intermodal Transit Center). The FrontRunner is a commuter rail service run by UTA that operates along the Wasatch Front with service from Provo, through Salt Lake County (including Salt Lake City), Davis County, Weber County, and Ogden. The FrontRunner also connects with UTA's TRAX light rail system in the Salt Lake Valley as well as Amtrak's California Zephyr (which runs daily between Chicago, Illinois and the San Francisco Bay Area).

The Dee Events Center Campus Shuttle Stop (now known as the Dee Events Center station) was upgraded to a transit center that would serve automobiles and bicycles (with bicycle facilities), as well as connect with local bus routes.

The Ogden Express runs every 10 minutes on weekdays between about 4:30 am and midnight. On Saturdays the frequency is every 15 minutes between about 9:30 am until 10:30 pm. On Sundays the frequency is every 30 minutes between about 10:00 am until 6:00 pm .

== Route description ==
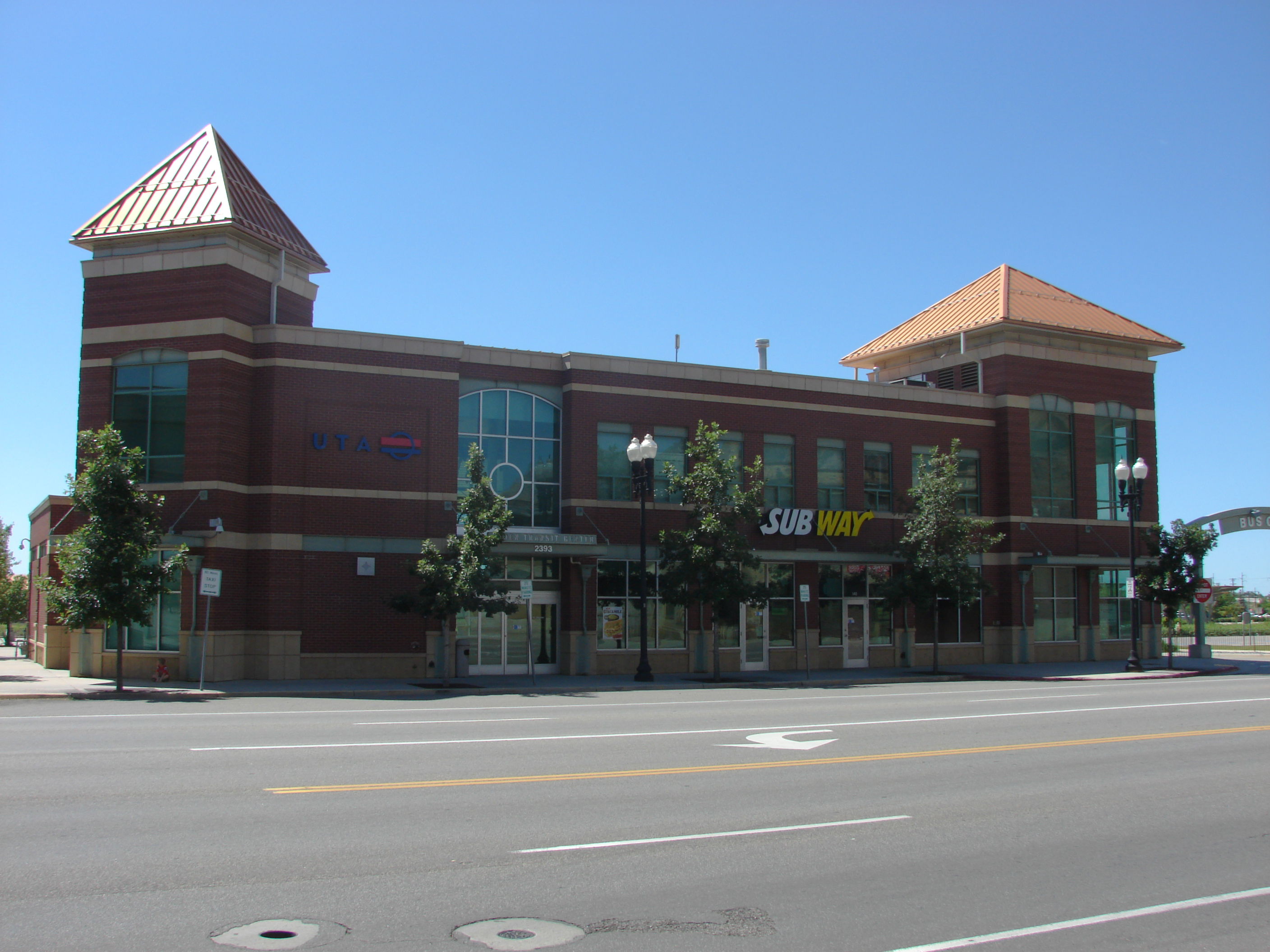
Ogden Central station, June 2015

The Ogden Express is designated as UTA Route 603X. The route begins in the Ogden Central station (formerly known as the Ogden Intermodal Transit Center) in west–central Ogden. It then runs east on 23rd Street to the Kiesel Avenue station. At Washington Boulevard (U.S. Route 89) it turns south along that street to reach the Washington Boulevard station. It then continues south and then east again on 25th Street to Jefferson Avenue, Monroe Boulevard, and 25th & Harrison stations.

Upon reaching Harrison Boulevard (SR-203) OGX turns south along that street. After the 28th Street station, passing west of the Ogden High School, and beginning at about 31st Street, the route transitions to bus–only lanes in the center of the road reaches the 32nd Street and 36th Street stations. At about 37th Street, the route shifts east, off Harrison Boulevard and onto a busway that cuts across main campus of WSU.

After the Weber State Central station and passing near multiple campus buildings it reaches the Wildcat Village station (located immediately northwest of its namesake, the Wildcat Village [student housing buildings]). The route then passes through a small residential area and leaves its busway. It then quickly reaches the Dee Events Center station (southwest of its namesake, the Dee Events Center). After passing just west of the Events Center, the route turns northwest, crosses Harrison Boulevard, and then has a counterclockwise look in the McKay-Dee Hospital parking lot, with the McKay-Dee Hospital station on the west side of the loop. After completing the loop, the OGX returns to Ogden Central station along a reverse of the same route.

== History ==
Planning for the project officially began with the transit corridor study in November 2004, but property acquisition began five years prior to that. In early planning serious consideration was given to using a streetcar (similar to UTA 's S Line) to satisfy the transportation needs along the corridor, but ultimately it was decided that BRT was the better option due to the costs involved with streetcar. WSU has had a vested interest in transportation improvements since they would enable more people to get to and from campus without the necessity of more parking.

On September 22, 2021, UTA officially announced the service is named the Ogden Express (OGX). Prior to the announcement, the project had been known as the Ogden/WSU BRT. Service along part of the OGX busway began August 29, 2022, between Weber State Central station and Dee Events Center station as the Wildcat Shuttle (UTA Route 602).

== Stops ==
Stops are listed from north to south. All stops are located in Ogden.

Stop	Southbound station	Northbound station	UTA bus connections (Note: Bus connection routes are current as of Change Day, August 20, 2023)	Opening date	Park & Ride lot	Notes
Ogden Central	2393 S Wall Avenue		455, 470, 473, 601, 604, 613, F618, F620, 630, 674, 675	August 20, 2023	Yes	FrontRunner
Kiesel Avenue	345 23rd St north side of street	345 23rd St south side of street	601*	August 20, 2023	No	Serves The Junction and Lindquist Field
Washington Boulevard	2459 Washington Blvd median of street	2459 Washington Blvd east side of street	470*, 601*, 604*, 612*	August 20, 2023	No	Serves Ogden/Weber Municipal Building
Jefferson Avenue	575 25th St north side of street	575 25th St south side of street		August 20, 2023	No	Serves U.S. Forest Service Building
Monroe Boulevard	790 25th St north side of street	790 25th St south side of street	645*	August 20, 2023	No	
25th & Harrison	1185 25th St north side of street	1185 25th St south side of street	473, 625*	August 20, 2023	No	
28th Street	2775 Harrison Blvd west side of street	2775 Harrison Blvd east side of street	625	August 20, 2023	No	Serves Ogden High School
32nd Street	3175 Harrison Blvd median of the street		455*, 625*, 645*	August 20, 2023	No	Serves Mount Ogden Jr. High School
36th Street	3575 Harrison Blvd median of the street		455*, 625*, 640*, 645*, 650*	August 20, 2023	No	
Weber State Central	1901 University Cir east side of busway	1901 University Cir west side of busway	602 (Wildcat Shuttle)	August 29, 2022	No	Serves WSU main campus
Wildcat Village	1300 Village Dr east side of busway	1300 Village Dr east side of busway	602 (Wildcat Shuttle)	August 29, 2022	No	Serves WSU student housing
Dee Events Center	4444 Event Center Dr transit hub north side	4444 Event Center Dr transit hub south side	602 (Wildcat Shuttle), 645	August 29, 2022	Yes	Serves Dee Events Center
McKay-Dee Hospital	4401 Harrison Blvd		645	August 20, 2023	No	Serves McKay-Dee Hospital
*Indicates bus connections which do not connect directly at station/stop, but are easily accessible nearby

== OGX Wildcat Shuttle ==
The OGX Wildcat Shuttle (or Wildcat Shuttle) (Note: Named after the mascot of the Weber State Wildcats.) is special bus route that is directly associated with the OGX in three ways:

- It runs along a small (0.84-mile [1.35 km]) section of the OGX busway, from the Weber State Central station to the Dee Events Center station.
- It is the only bus other than the OGX that utilizes the OGX busway and the stations along it.
- It has a 10-minute frequency that matches the weekday OGX frequency and the Wildcat Shuttle's schedule it set to run between the OGX buses so that when it is operating, either an OGX or Wildcat Shuttle stops approximately every five minutes at the three stations on the WSU campus.

The Wildcat Shuttle is designated as UTA Route 602. The Wildcat Shuttle operates Monday through Friday with a 10-minute frequency from about 7:15 am to 2:30 pm, but only on days when WSU is in session for Fall and Winter semesters. The Wildcat Shuttle turns around on its north end at a roundabout on the OGX busway immediately north of the Weber State Central station and on a loop in the Dee Events Center parking lot on its southern end.

The Wildcat Shuttle began operating on August 29, 2022 (one year prior to the completion of the remainder of OGX), but with a fairly different schedule. Initially, the Wildcat Shuttle only ran Monday through Friday, but only on days when WSU is in session for Fall and Winter semesters. Its initial schedule was every ten minutes from about 6:30 am to 8:30 pm, but increasing to every five minutes between about 8:30 am to 2:30 pm. However, from May 8 to August 18, 2023 (following the end of the WSU 2023 Winter Semester), the Wildcat Shuttle began operating Monday through Friday with a fifteen-minute frequency from about 8:00 am to 8:00 pm.

== See also ==
- Utah Transit Authority bus rapid transit
- FrontRunner
