= MDHC =

MDHC may stand for:

- McKay-Dee Hospital Center, now McKay-Dee Hospital, in Ogden, Utah, US
- Mersey Docks and Harbour Company, in Liverpool, England
