= Utah Transit Authority =

Public transit agency in northern Utah, United States

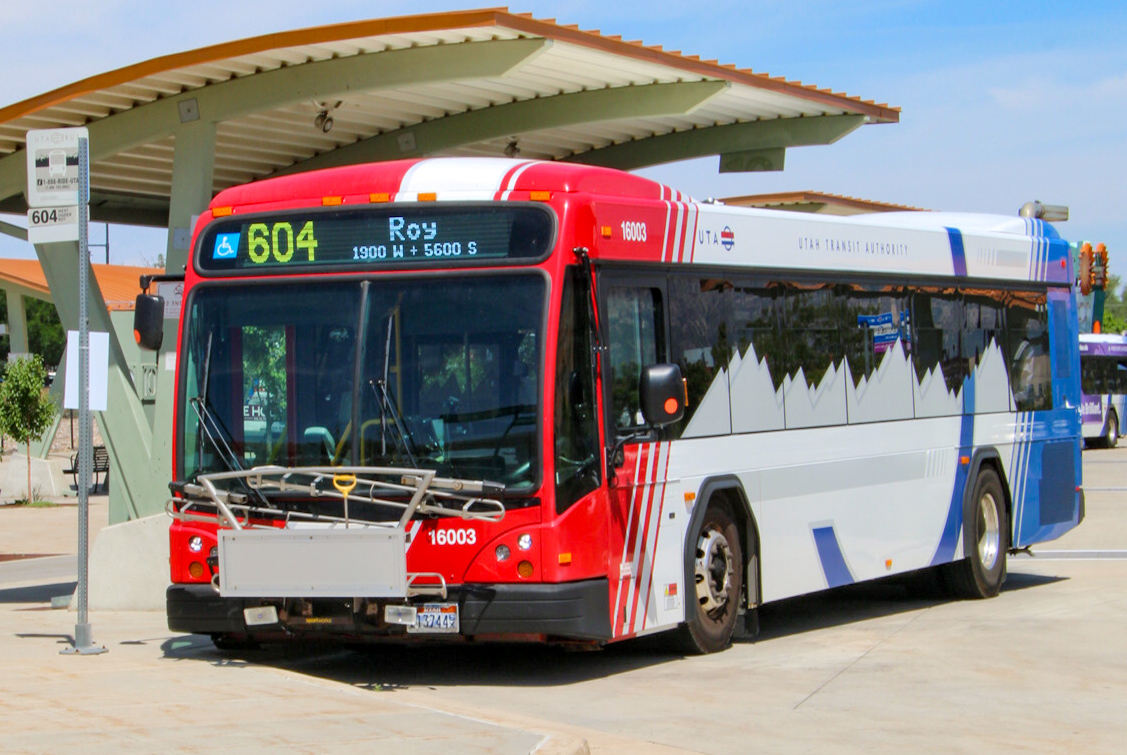
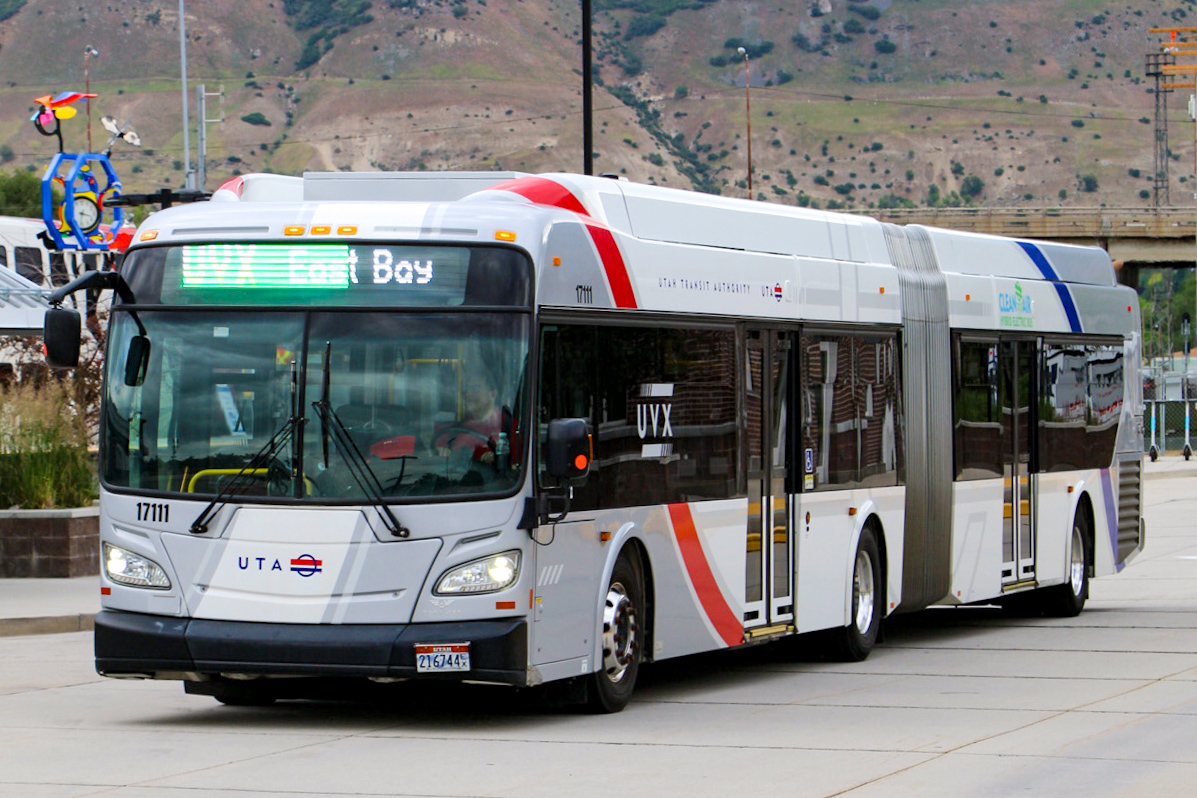
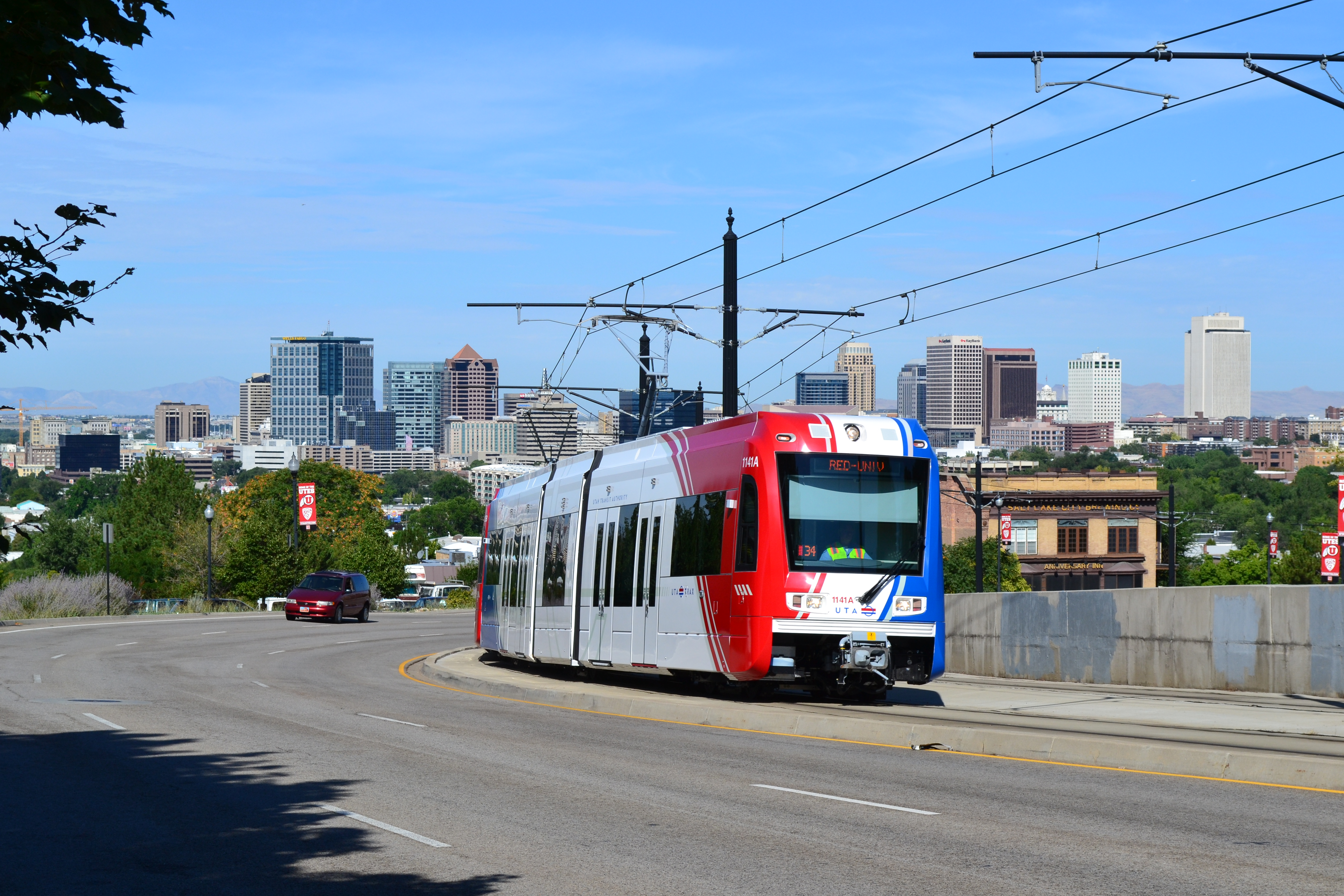
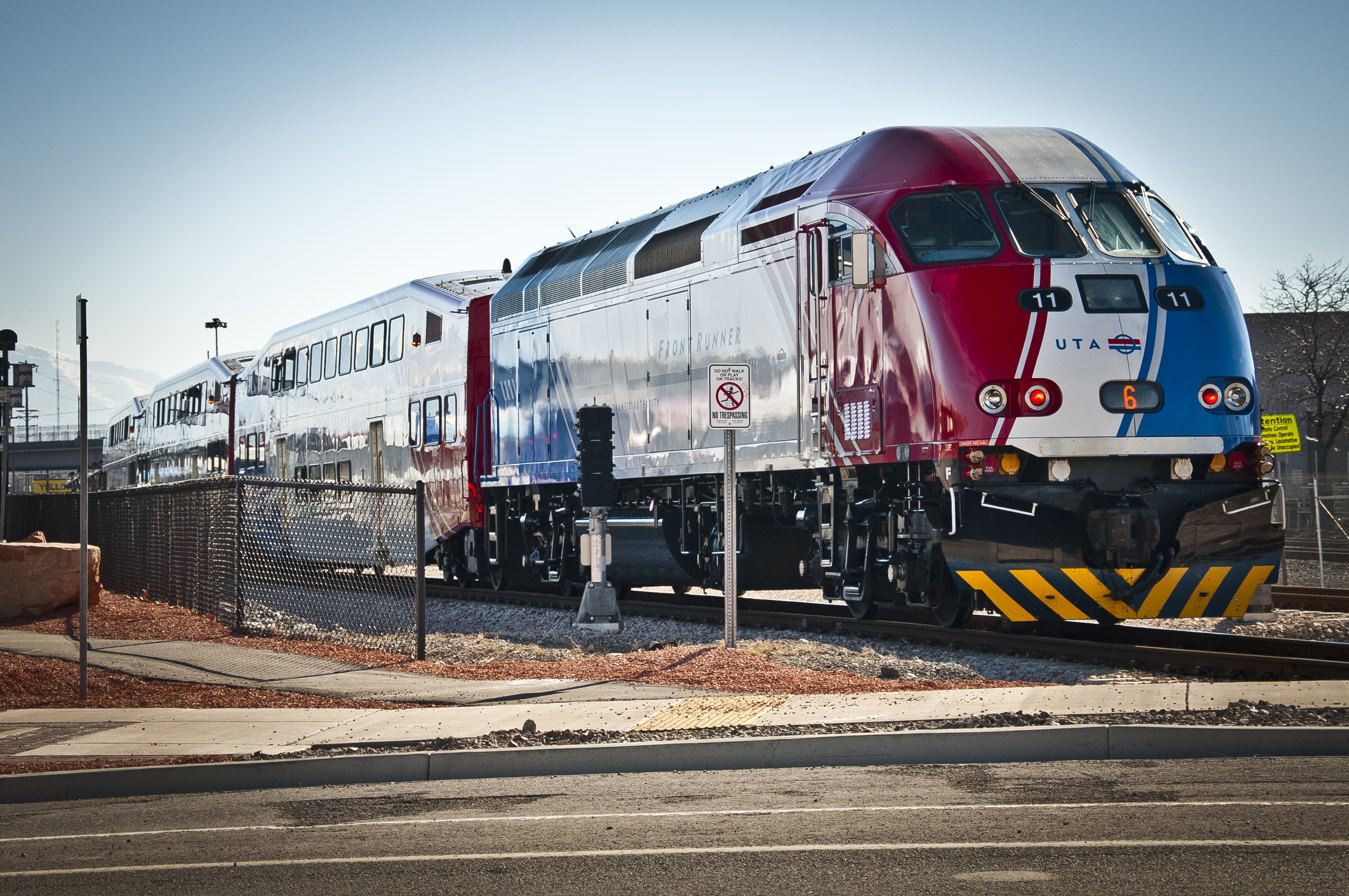
- UTA services, clockwise from top left: local bus, bus rapid transit, FrontRunner commuter rail, TRAX light rail
- Founded: March 3, 1970
- Headquarters: 669 West 200 South; Salt Lake City, Utah
- Locale: Wasatch Front, Utah, U.S.
- Service area: Box Elder, Davis, Salt Lake, Tooele, Utah, and Weber counties
- Service type: Transit bus, bus rapid transit, light rail, commuter rail, streetcar, microtransit, paratransit, vanpool
- Routes: 89 bus routes (January 2026) 3 light rail lines (TRAX); 1 commuter rail line (FrontRunner); 3 bus rapid transit lines (MVX, UVX, and OGX) 1 streetcar (S-Line)
- Hubs: Central Pointe; Murray Central; North Temple; Ogden Central; Orem Central; Provo Central; Salt Lake Central; West Valley Central
- Stations: 52 (light rail); 16 (commuter rail); 47 (bus rapid transit); 7 (streetcar [stops])
- Fleet: More than 700 buses 400 vanpools 114 light rail vehicles 53 commuter rail cars 18 locomotives
- Daily ridership: 138,500 (weekdays, Q2 2026)
- Annual ridership: 40,372,100 (2025)
- Chief executive: Jay Fox
- Website: rideuta.com

The Utah Transit Authority (UTA) is a public transportation agency serving the Wasatch Front of Utah, in the United States. Its service area covers parts of Box Elder, Weber, Davis, Tooele, Salt Lake, and Utah counties. The UTA operates fixed route buses, flex route buses, express buses, ski buses, three bus rapid transit lines (UVX, OGX, and MVX), three light rail lines in Salt Lake County (TRAX), a streetcar line in Salt Lake City (the S-Line), a commuter rail service between Ogden and Provo via Salt Lake City (FrontRunner), six microtransit zones (UTA On Demand), as well as paratransit and vanpool services.

UTA is headquartered in Salt Lake City with operations and garages in locations throughout the Wasatch Front, including Ogden, Midvale, and Orem. Light rail vehicles are stored and maintained at yards at locations in South Salt Lake and Midvale. UTA's commuter rail equipment is stored and serviced at a facility in Salt Lake City. In 2025, the system had a ridership of 40,372,100, or about 138,500 per weekday as of the second quarter of 2026.

== History ==
The Utah Transit Authority traces its roots to 1953 when several bus companies united to form the organization. Ironically, among the constitutive companies of the UTA was National City Lines, famous for its alleged aggressive tactics against American streetcar lines on behalf of General Motors. NSL had bought out and promptly decommissioned the electric trolleys operated by the Utah Light and Traction Company in Salt Lake City neighborhoods like the Avenues in the 1940s.

Throughout the 1950s buses became more and more unpopular, with low gas prices and subsidized construction of highways like Interstate 15. By 1960, bus ridership was only about one third the level of war-time Salt Lake, and the average age of riders was 14.

In 1969, the Utah State Legislature passed the Utah Public Transit District Act, which allowed individual communities to address transportation needs by forming local transit districts. UTA was subsequently founded on March 3, 1970, when the cities of Sandy, Salt Lake City, and Murray voted to form a transit district. Service was extended to Weber and Davis counties in 1973 and to Utah County in 1985. Today, the UTA's service area is over 1,400 square miles (3,600 km^{2}) and covers six counties: Box Elder, Davis, Salt Lake, Tooele, Utah, and Weber.

UTA saw rapid expansion through the mid-1970s and 1980s. It strove to streamline the bus system, connecting the east and west sides of the Salt Lake Valley with east–west routes along 2100 South, 3300 South/3500 South, and 4500 South/4700 South, in 1975. Four bus routes to Granger, Hunter (which today comprise West Valley City), Kearns, Magna, and Tooele were also created the same year. Sunday service on 25 routes began in 1975, only to be removed in 1988. (Sunday service resumed in 2001.) In 1976, the UTA began offering ski bus service to Alta, Brighton, Snowbird, and Solitude ski resorts in Big and Little Cottonwood Canyons. Today, the UTA offers seasonal buses to those four resorts as well as Snowbasin Resort and Powder Mountain in Weber County and Sundance Resort in Utah County.

Since the turn of the century, the entire service area of UTA has seen bus route redesigns, beginning with Utah County in 2000. Weber and Davis Counties saw an overhaul of their bus routing in 2002. The largest and most comprehensive change in routing occurred in August 2007 in Salt Lake County, with the goal of increasing ridership by twelve percent. Prior to 2007, night service had different numbering and routing than regular daytime service. After the redesign, nighttime routes were to retain the same routing and numbering as their daytime counterparts. Routes were consolidated as well, with 69 routes reduced to 60. Fifteen-minute service during weekday daytime hours was extended from two to 11 routes, and all other routes in the system had 30-minute service during weekday peak hours at the very least. "Fast buses," which connected suburbs to the city and charged the same fare as local buses (as opposed to express buses, which required a higher fare), were also introduced and expanded. The redesign proposal was met with criticism, with low-income advocacy groups claiming that the redesign focused too heavily on commuters rather than the disadvantaged. The route redesign achieved its intended goal—from 2007 to 2011, bus ridership in the entire system increased from 77,500 to 88,700, an increase of 18 percent.

Beginning in 2010, a decline in funding that UTA was receiving from sales tax revenues resulted in service reductions. Fast bus trips were substantially reduced, with many fast bus routes being cut altogether. Saturday and night service saw cuts as well. The opening of two new TRAX extensions exacerbated bus route service cuts, especially in the western side of the valley; routes that previously traveled from the western suburbs to downtown would end at Green Line stations, with riders expected to complete the rest of their journeys via the Green Line. For the first time in 2010, there was no service on Memorial and Labor days. Service on those holidays was later restored, and as of 2020 UTA provides bus and rail service on most holidays with the exception of Thanksgiving, Christmas, and New Year's Day.

Amidst the service cuts and rail expansions, UTA struck a deal with Park City and Summit County to begin operating an express bus between Salt Lake City and Park City in October 2011. This express service was called PC-SLC Connect until High Valley Transit took over the route with its 107 service.

== Services ==
=== Bus service ===
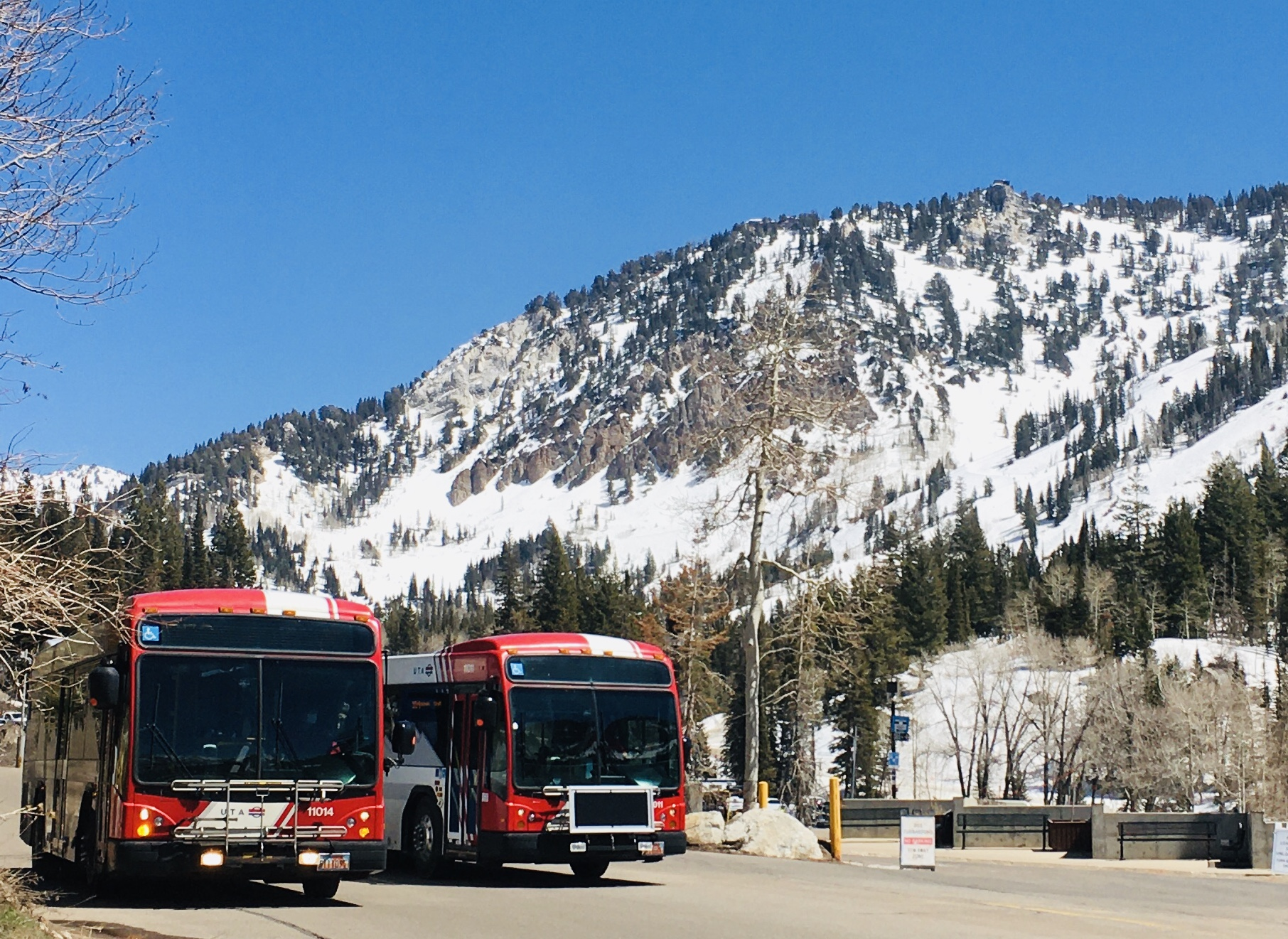
Ski Buses at Snowbird Ski Area.

The Utah Transit Authority (UTA) operates fixed-route bus service throughout its six-county service area along the Wasatch Front. UTA's January 2026 Fast Facts listed 89 bus routes serving approximately 5,523 stops. The bus network includes local, express, seasonal ski, flexible-route, and bus rapid transit services. Most of these routes provide regular transportation throughout the day, while many are primarily commuter routes. Some are special services, such as ski routes that only operate seasonally.

Occasionally, the UTA will also offer service for special events or extend service on certain days of the year such as New Year's Eve. UTA regularly modifies or changes its bus routes, but whenever reasonably possible (other than temporary detours) limits the adjustments to Change Days. The majority of bus routes stay within the Ogden to Provo corridor, with limited service south to Santaquin, in Utah County, and north to Brigham City, in Box Elder County.

==== Bus rapid transit ====
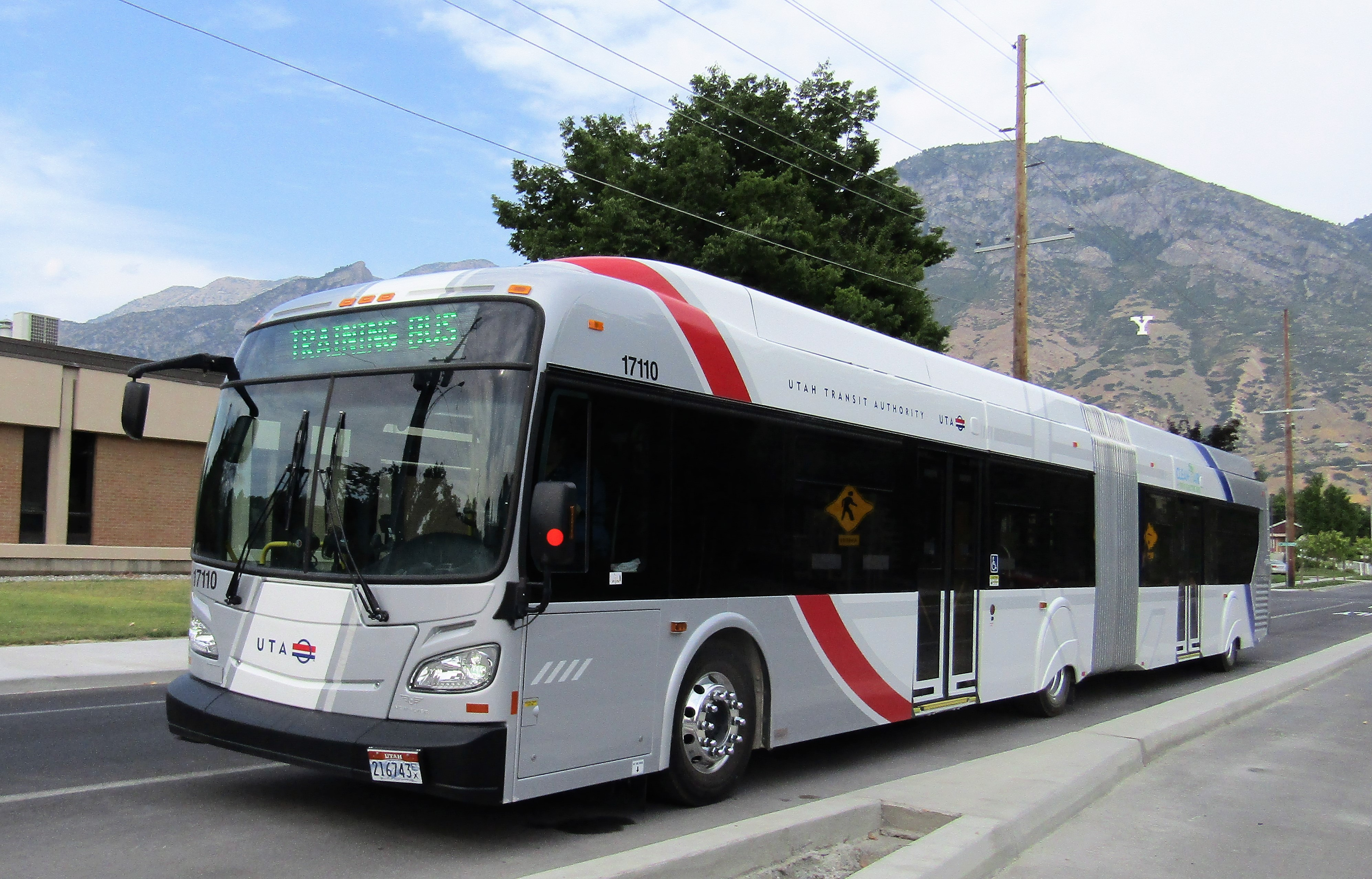
Utah Valley Express bus, showing the left side doors.

The Utah Valley Express (UVX) line operates between Provo Central station and Orem Central station via Brigham Young University and Utah Valley University, utilizing a dedicated busway across most of the route located in the center median of University Parkway, University Avenue, and East 700 North. The line opened in August 2018 and uses 60-foot articulated buses with doors on both sides of the bus to load passengers from busway stations located in the center median.

The Ogden Express (OGX) line is a line between Ogden Central station and McKay-Dee Hospital, utilizing a dedicated busway that cuts through the campus of Weber State University and in the center median of Harrison Boulevard. On August 29, 2022, a short section of the line, entirely on the Weber State University busway opened. The rest of the line opened on August 20, 2023. The line uses 40-foot battery-electric buses.

The Midvalley Express (MVX) line operates between Murray, Taylorsville, and West Valley, connecting to the TRAX Red and Blue lines in Murray and Green Line in West Valley. MVX includes a station at the Taylorsville campus of Salt Lake Community College. The line opened on Spring Change Day (April 12) 2026. MVX uses electric buses, and station shelters feature artwork inspired by local landscapes, people, and culture.

UTA previously operated the 3500 South MAX line between Magna and the Millcreek TRAX station via West Valley City. The line was suspended in 2020 at the start of the COVID-19 pandemic and is now permanently discontinued.

==== Flex routes ====
UTA has 14 bus routes that are allowed to deviate up to 3/4 mile (1.2 km) from their set route to pick up or drop off passengers. These "flexible" routes are called Flex routes and are indicated by the letter "F" at the beginning of the route number (e.g. F618). Flex routes combine the convenience of curb-to-curb service with regular fixed routes making them a viable option for many paratransit riders. Certain rules and restrictions apply to Flex routes:

- Only two deviations are allowed per trip; however, even with deviations, routes maintain a schedule and never depart designated stops early.
- Riding Flex routes costs the same as regular routes; however, the cost for deviations is an additional $1.25 (in addition to the regular fare).
- Deviations may be scheduled up to seven days in advance but not less than two hours prior to travel time and can be made by calling 801-BUS-RIDE (801-287-7433) between 8:30 a.m. and 3 p.m.

==== Ski service ====
UTA operates a seasonal Ski bus service to resorts in the Wasatch Mountains. As of 2026, the service connects riders with Alta, Brighton, Powder Mountain, Snowbasin, Snowbird, Solitude, and Sundance. Service generally begins in late November or early December and continues through late March or April, depending on resort operating seasons.

Current ski routes include route 972 (Brighton/Solitude/Midvale), route 994 (Alta/Snowbird/Sandy), Route 880 (Sundance/Provo), route 674 (Powder Mountain/Ogden), route 675 (Snowbasin/Ogden) and route 677 (Snowbasin/Layton).

==== Paratransit ====
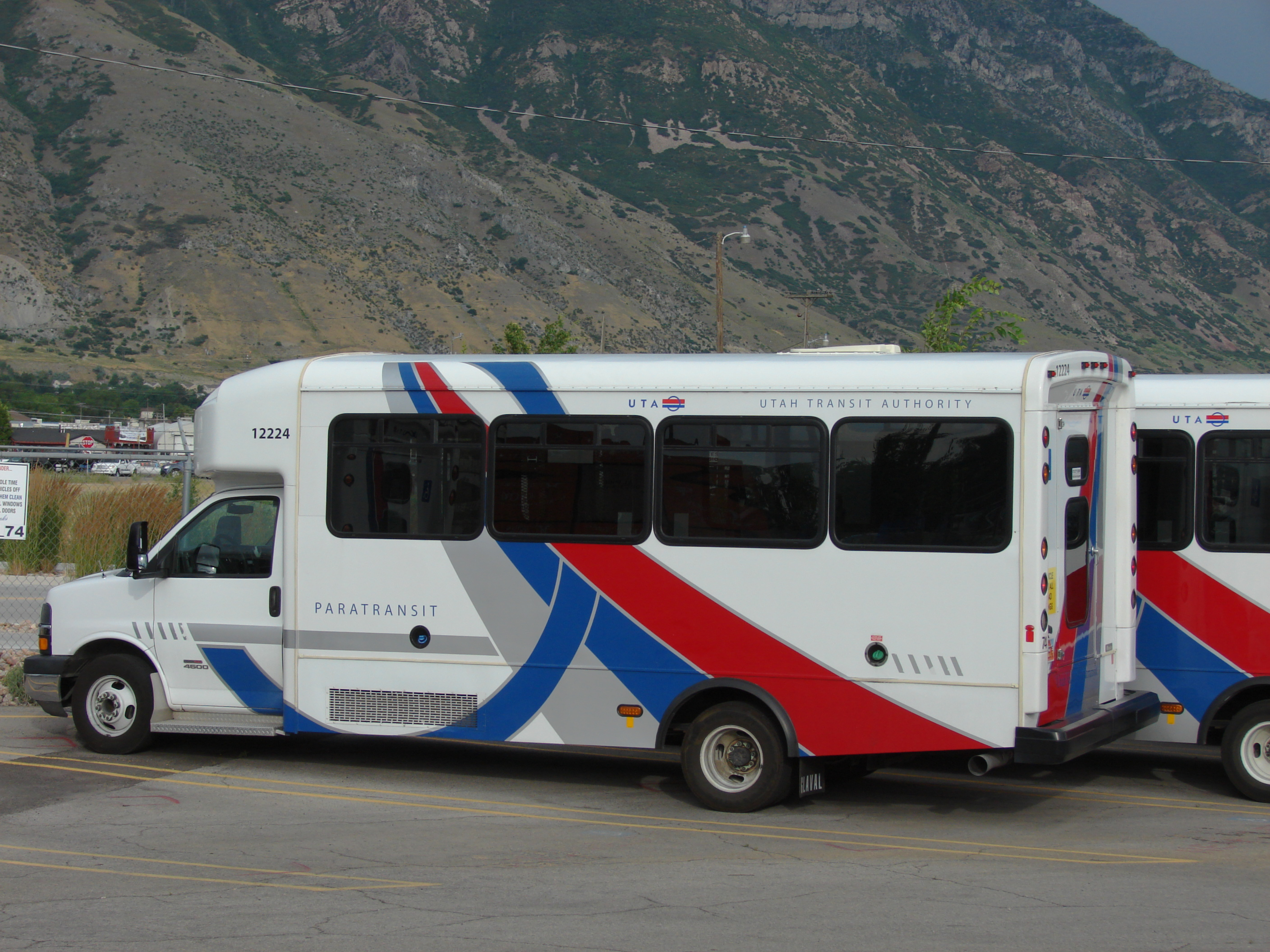
UTA paratransit bus

Throughout its area of operation, UTA provides paratransit service in addition to its Flex routes for qualifying disabled passengers that are unable to, either temporarily or permanently, utilized the other transportation services provided by UTA (including bus service, TRAX, the S-Line, and FrontRunner). Although the cost to UTA for this service is substantial to UTA, the fare remains the same for passengers.

Paratransit fare is $4 for one-way curb-to-curb transportation. Riders must be pre-qualified to use the service.

=== Light rail ===
==== TRAX ====
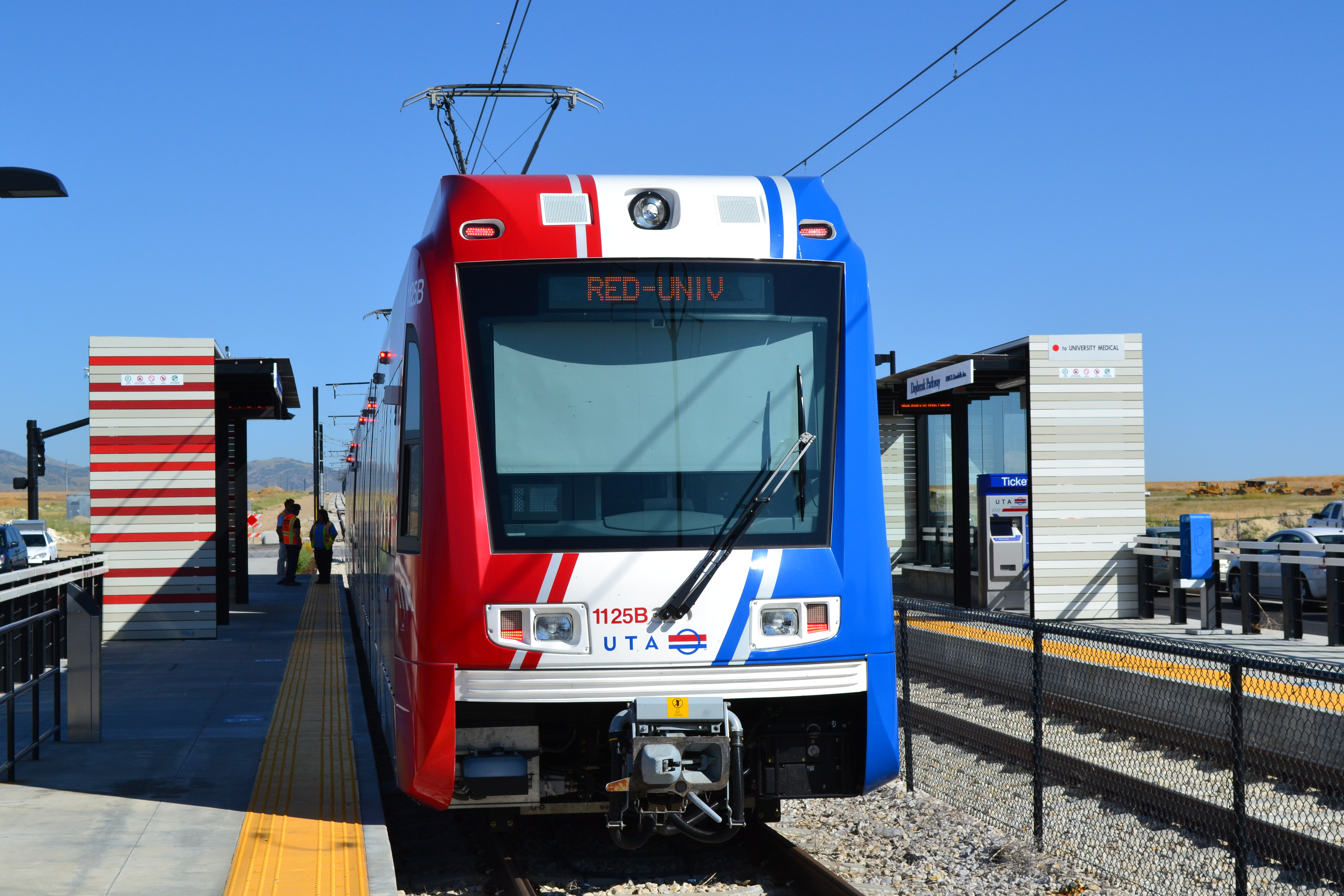
A Red Line TRAX train stationed at Daybreak Parkway station

Population growth and accompanying congestion led to the study of the feasibility of light rail in the Salt Lake Valley in the early 1990s. A 1993 initiative to use tax revenues to purchase an underutilized rail corridor for potential light rail use was rejected by Salt Lake County voters. The County Commission opposed increasing taxes for light rail and even hired a lobbyist to this end. Nonetheless, the Utah Transit Authority moved forward and was able to make the purchase using other available funds.

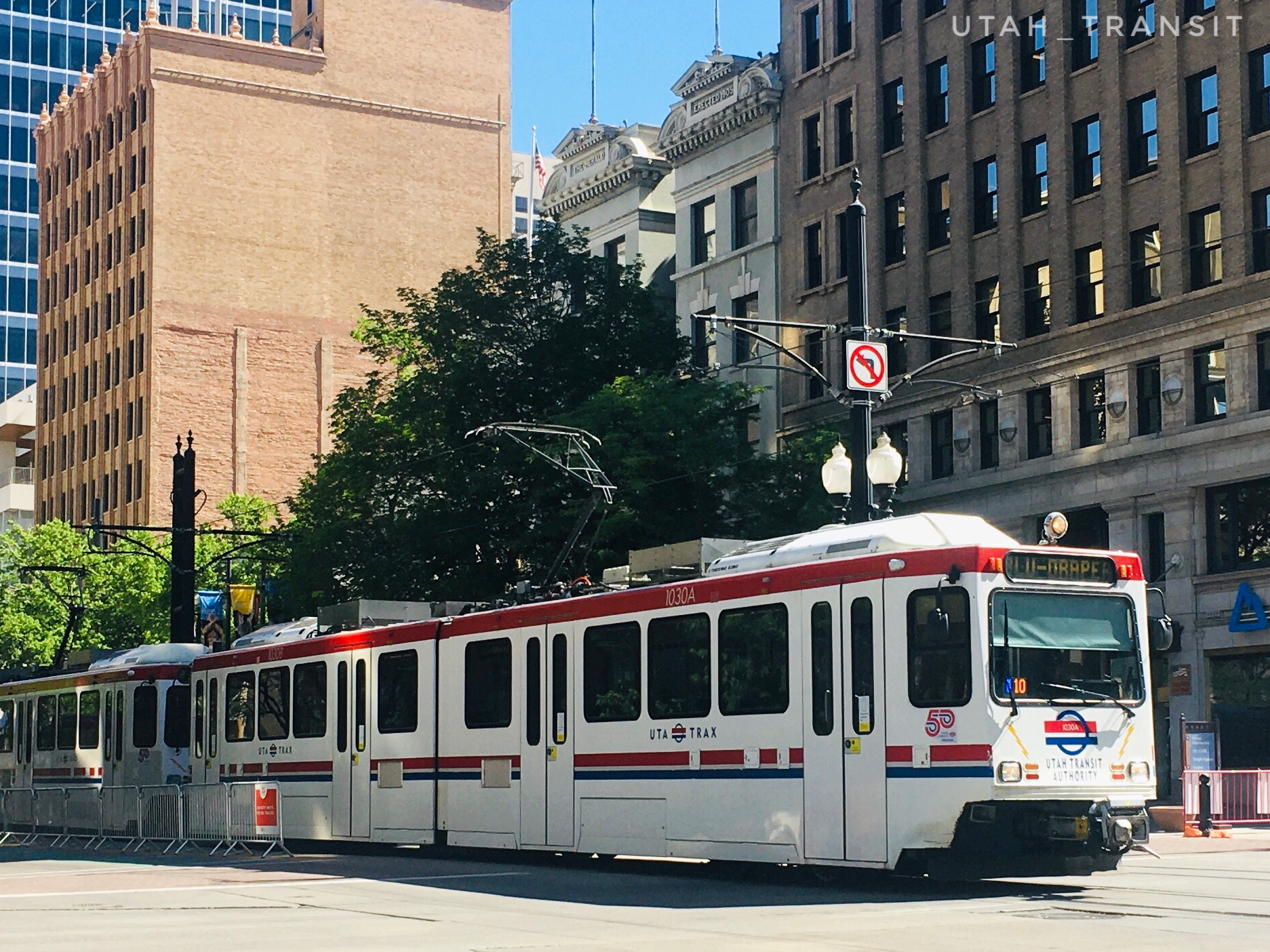
A Blue Line TRAX Train crossing 200 South.

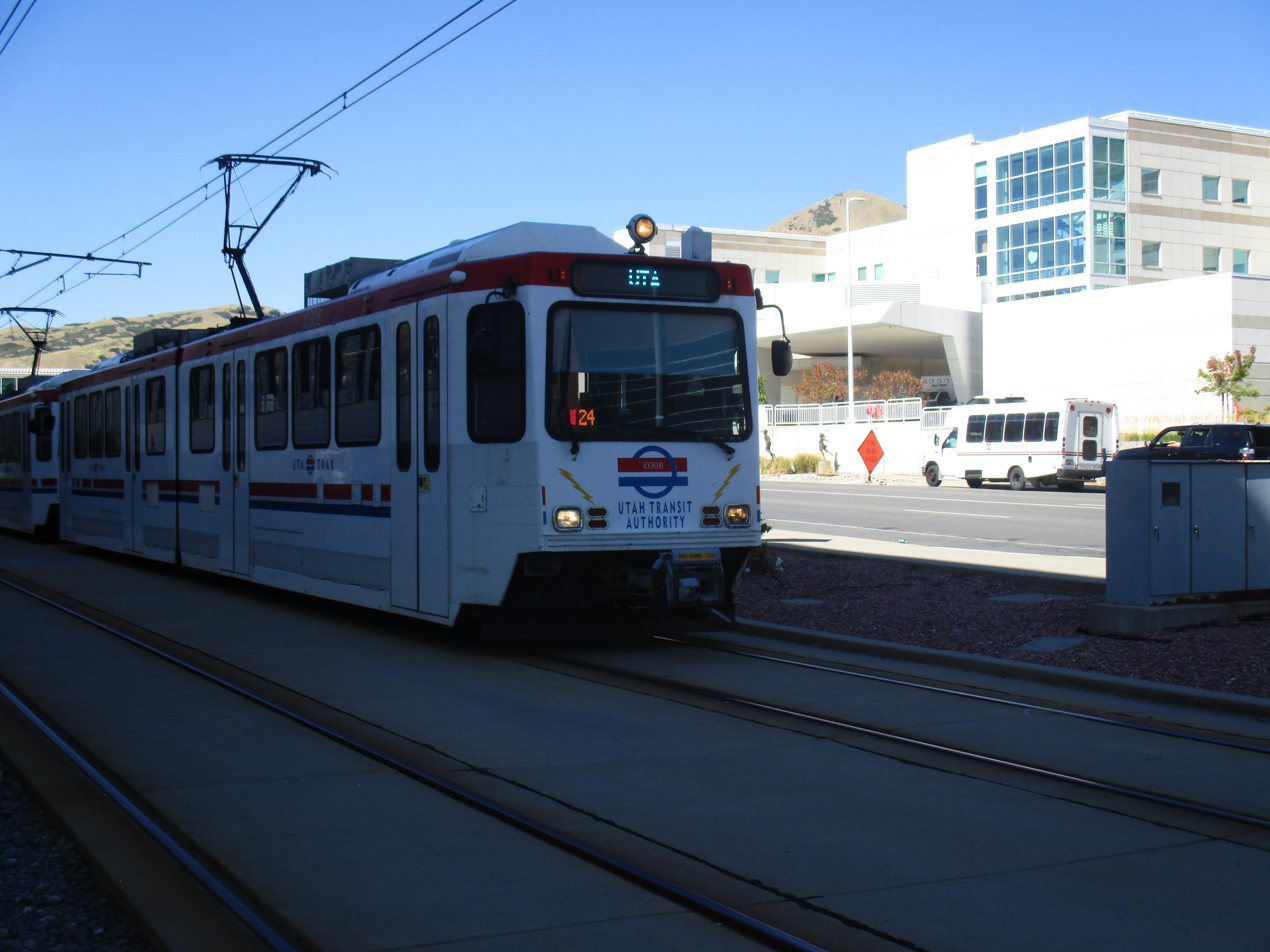
A Siemens SD-160 TRAX train parked at the University Medical station for special event service; fitted with an upgraded PA system.

UTA also lobbied for funding and in August 1995 won $240 million from the federal government as part of the budget for I-15 reconstruction. The light rail system was called TRAX. This federal grant amounted to over two-thirds the cost of the Blue Line to Sandy, and further bills would fund a second line to the University of Utah. Salt Lake City's successful bid to host the 2002 Winter Olympics gave the light rail project some priority over transit projects in other cities competing for federal funds; Secretary of Transportation Federico Peña explained, "The Winter Olympics in Salt Lake are not just Salt Lake's Olympics. They are the nation's Olympics." Nonetheless, UTA's cost-effective light rail project merited the support of the Federal Transit Administration and would have been funded and constructed regardless of the Olympics.

TRAX became operational December 4, 1999, with an initial route of 17.3 miles (27.8 km)—the Blue Line, then simply dubbed the Sandy/Salt Lake Line—from Sandy to Downtown Salt Lake City. In celebration, UTA offered free rides on the new line all day, and local residents stood in long lines to be packed into the new light rail cars. The Blue Line was expanded in April 2008 to Salt Lake Central station, and as part of UTA's FrontLines 2015 project, a three-station expansion of the line further south to Draper was completed.

Due to federal funding, the initial 2.3 miles (3.7 km) of the Red Line (or the University Line, as it was initially named), from downtown Salt Lake to the University of Utah, was operational by December 15, 2001—after 16 months of construction and well ahead of the original schedule. Construction was expedited to be completed before the 2002 Winter Olympics, to enable spectators to take TRAX to the opening ceremonies at Rice-Eccles Stadium. In light of heightened security in the wake of the 9/11 attacks, however, light rail service was suspended during the opening and closing ceremonies. Buses were used instead, and though also vulnerable, transported attendees without incident. An extension of 1.5 miles (2.4 km) further east to the University of Utah Medical Center was completed September 29, 2003, and an expansion of 10.6 miles (17.1 km) to South Jordan in the southwestern corner of the metropolitan area opened on August 7, 2011, with service to the Daybreak Community. At this same time TRAX lines began to be referred to by a color-coded name (rather than destinations) and the Red Line trains no longer traveled downtown, instead bypassing the city center and heading south and then southwest.

The success of TRAX led to the creation of a third line—the Green Line—which runs from the Airport station at the Salt Lake International Airport through Downtown Salt Lake City to West Valley Central station in West Valley City. This line also originally opened on August 7, 2011, and services 18 stations. The Airport extension of the Green Line, which added six new stations and provided rail service from downtown Salt Lake City to the Salt Lake International Airport for the first time, opened for service on April 14, 2013.

==== The S-Line ====
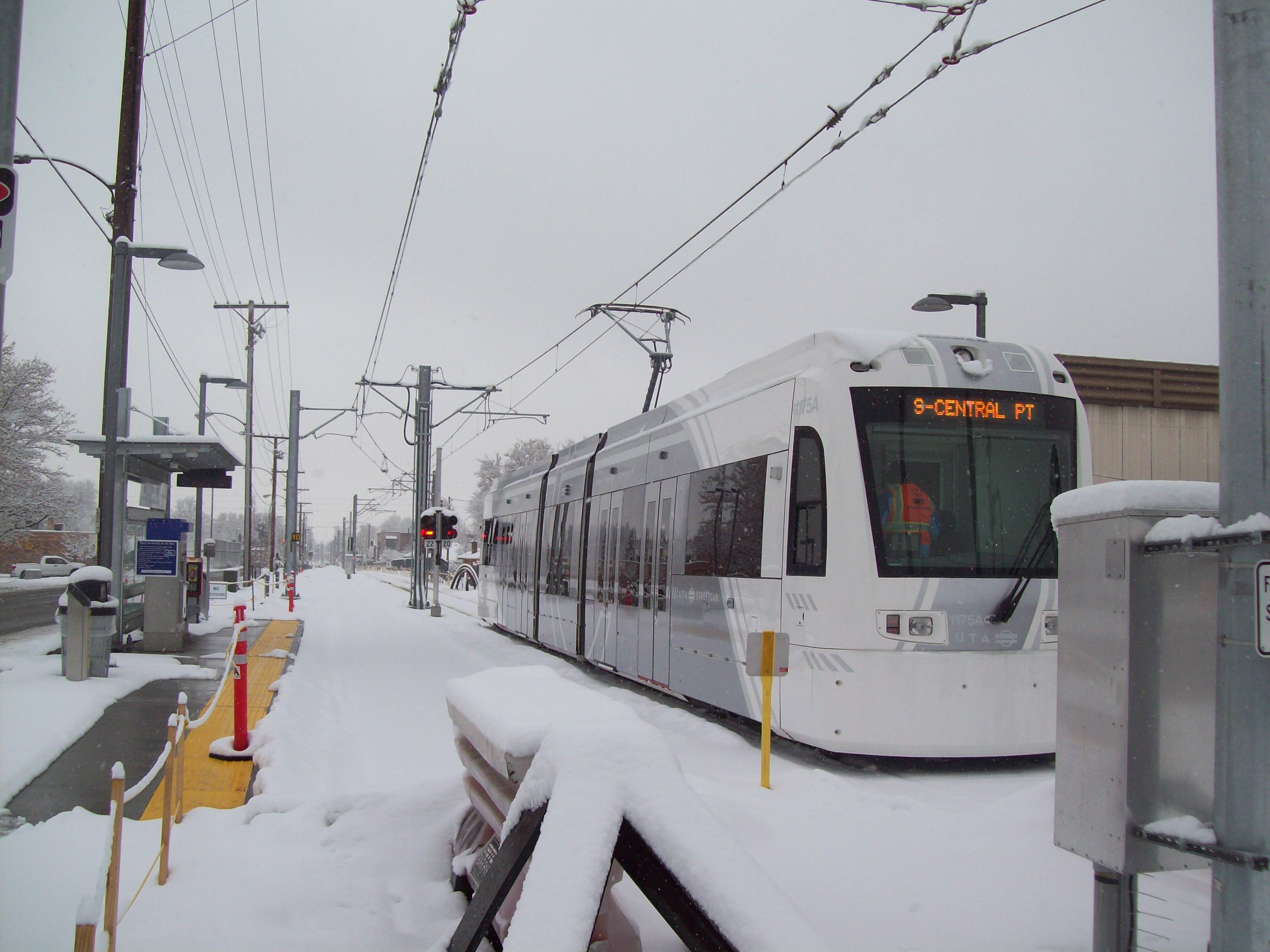
An S-Line streetcar at the Fairmont stop

The S-Line (formerly known as Sugar House Streetcar) is a streetcar transit line that connects Sugar House (a neighborhood of Salt Lake City) with the neighboring city of South Salt Lake, as well as the UTA TRAX system. It is a joint project between UTA, Salt Lake City, and South Salt Lake. The S-Line runs along the old Denver and Rio Grande Western Railroad (D&RGW) line (which lies between 2100 South and the I-80 freeway) from the Central Pointe TRAX Station in South Salt Lake east to McClelland Street (1040 East) in Salt Lake City. The S-Line line differs slightly from the TRAX lines in that it travels a slower speed, stops more often, and has "stops" instead of "stations". It is also intended for shorter trips than TRAX, as the initial length of the entire line is only about 2 miles (3.2 km).

Phase 1 of the S-Line opened for service on December 8, 2013. Construction began in 2026 to extend the S-Line from its terminus at Fairmont Station (1040 east) to Highland Drive, adding a new station.

In addition to the S-Line, several other areas in and around Salt Lake City are being evaluated for similar streetcar lines, but no specific projects have been announced so far.

=== FrontRunner commuter rail ===
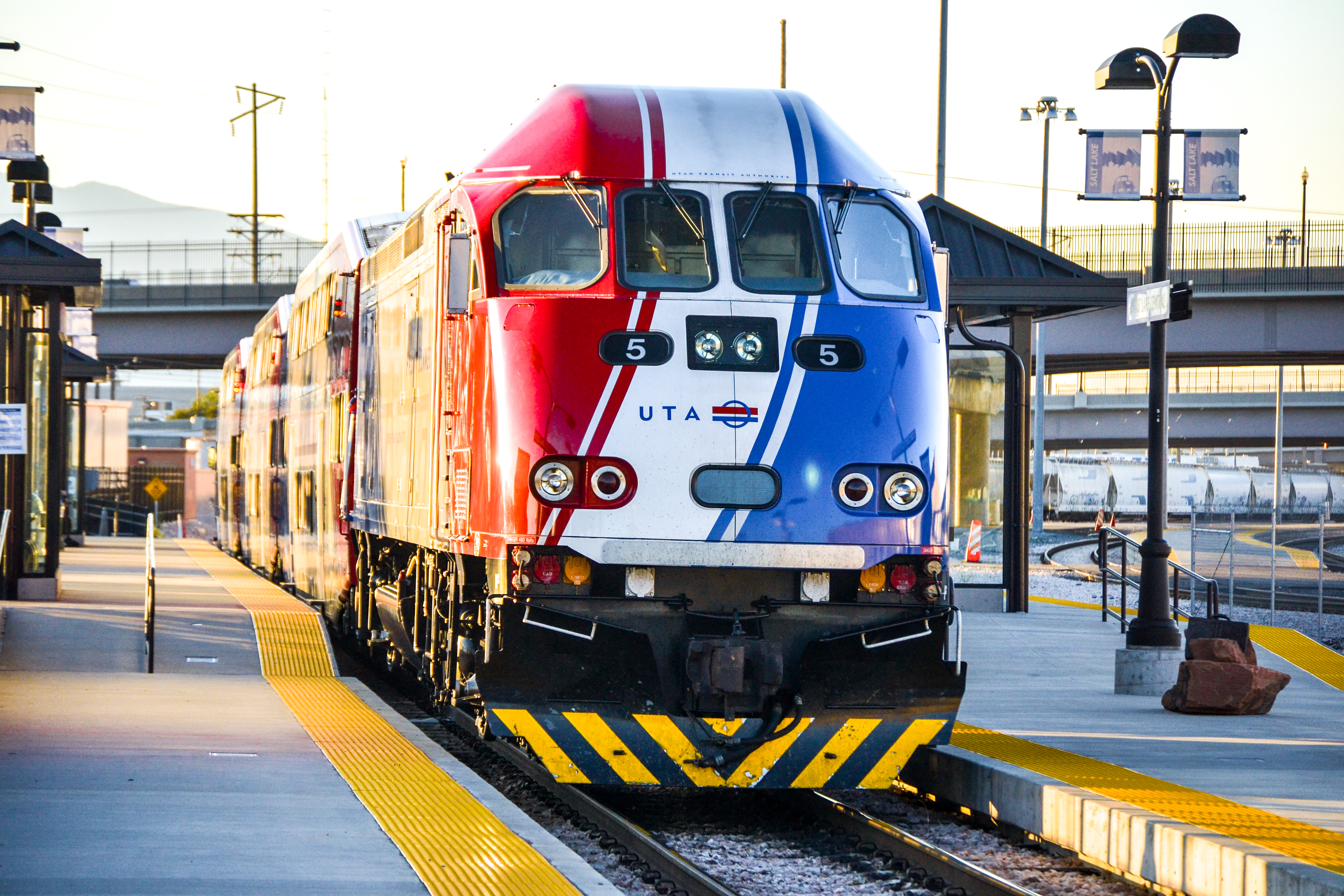
A FrontRunner train at Salt Lake Central

In 2002, UTA announced a deal with Union Pacific to purchase a segment of track and right-of-way for a commuter rail line from Salt Lake City to Pleasant View, just northwest of Ogden. The new commuter train was named the FrontRunner in reference to the fact that it was intended to run up and down the Wasatch Front. Construction on the FrontRunner corridor began on August 10, 2005; seven stations opened running from Ogden to Salt Lake City on April 26, 2008. As part of the FrontLines 2015 project, the commuter rail corridor has been expanded south 44 miles (71 km) to Provo. Service began on the new southern extension on December 10, 2012. Future expansion may extend the corridor north to Brigham City in Box Elder County, and south to Payson and then Santaquin, with the possibility of even extending as far south as Nephi in Juab County.

In late 2020, the UTA began a virtual Open House event where citizens of Tooele were able to comment on a potential expansion of FrontRunner or bus service from Salt Lake City to Tooele County.

=== Rideshare ===
The UTA operates a transportation demand management program known as UTA Rideshare, which promotes alternatives to single-occupancy vehicle commuting. Its programs include vanpooling, carpool matching, transit passes, active transportation, and other commuting alternatives.

UTA's Vanpool program provides vehicles to groups of commuters traveling to similar locations. UTA-owned vehicles are driven by approved volunteers, with fares based primarily on distance traveled; UTA provides fuel, maintenance, and insurance. The service operates statewide, including outside the UTA's regular fixed-route service area. In 2025, it recorded more than 1.3 million passenger trips, up 15.7 percent from the previous year. The UTA also maintains an online database for finding potential carpool partners based on origin, destination, and travel times.

==== UTA On Demand ====
UTA On Demand is the UTA's microtransit service. It provides both curb-to-curb and door-to-door trips within designated geographic zones and is intended to provide local transportation and both first-mile and last-mile connections with fixed-route services such as bus, TRAX, and FrontRunner. As of August 2026, UTA On Demand operates in six service zones:

- South Davis County
- Salt Lake City Westside
- Southern Salt Lake County
- Tooele County
- North Utah County
- West Provo/Orem

The program began in 2019. UTA On Demand recorded approximately 645,000 boardings during 2025 and surpassed two million cumulative riders since the program's introduction.

== Routes ==
As of April 2026, UTA operates three light rail lines (TRAX), one commuter rail line (FrontRunner), three BRT lines, a streetcar line (the S-Line), and approximately 89 regular bus routes. UTA also operates seasonal ski service.

== Fleet ==
=== Buses ===
Fleet numbers		Garage	Year	Make & model	Picture	Notes
07001–07034	07001–07002, 07004–07006	Depot District	2007	Gillig BRT 40'		Remaining buses fleet numbers listed here.
07001–07034	07028–07031	Timpanogos	2007	Gillig BRT 40'		Remaining buses fleet numbers listed here.
07001–07034	07013–07021 (some retired)	Ogden	2007	Gillig BRT 40'		Remaining buses fleet numbers listed here.
09001–09042	09030–09042 (some retired)	Timpanogos	2009	Gillig BRT 40'		Most retired, last in service 09030–09036, 09039, 09042 09005, 09007, 09027–09029 transferred to High Valley Transit
09051–09055 (some retired)		Timpanogos	2009	Gillig BRT Suburban 40'		Coach seat style bus with no back door 09053–09055 retired.
10001		Ogden	2009	Gillig BRT 40'		Gillig DEF Pilot bus. 2009 model
10002–10037	10003, 10008 10011–10022, 10029-10033 (some retired)	Ogden	2010	Gillig BRT 40'		Remaining buses fleet numbers listed here. 10037 transferred to High Valley Transit
10002–10037	10005-10007, 10010, 10023	Timpanogos	2010	Gillig BRT 40'		Remaining buses fleet numbers listed here. 10037 transferred to High Valley Transit
10002–10037	10027, 10036	Meadowbrook	2010	Gillig BRT 40'		Remaining buses fleet numbers listed here. 10037 transferred to High Valley Transit
11001–11030	11004–11008, 11013–11015	Meadowbrook	2011	Gillig BRT 35'		Snow chain equipped. Special mountain wrap and large rear doors for ski service.
11001–11030	11009-11010, 11016–11030	Ogden	2011	Gillig BRT 35'		Snow chain equipped. Special mountain wrap and large rear doors for ski service.
11001–11030	11001–11003, 11011–11012	Timpanogos	2011	Gillig BRT 35'		Snow chain equipped. Special mountain wrap and large rear doors for ski service.
12001–12031		Meadowbrook	2012	Gillig BRT 40'		12003 totaled in accident 2021.
13001–13010		Depot District	2013	Gillig BRT CNG 40'		CNG buses
13031–13044		Depot District	2013	Gillig BRT Plus CNG 40'		Second order in 2013, utilizing a full roof
13051–13052		Timpanogos	2013	Gillig BRT 35'		Snow chain equipped. Special mountain wrap and large rear doors for ski service.
14001–14020		Ogden	2014	Gillig BRT 40'		14020 Totaled in accident 2023
15001–15023		Depot District	2015	Gillig BRT CNG Plus 40'		CNG buses
16001–16005		Ogden	2016	Gillig BRT 35'		Used on routes 674, 675, and 677. Special mountain wrap and large rear doors for ski service.
17001–17037	17001–17014	Ogden	2017	Gillig BRT 40'		
17001–17037	17015–17037	Meadowbrook	2017	Gillig BRT 40'		
17038–17057		Meadowbrook	2017	Gillig BRT 40'		2018 Models
17071–17077		Ogden	2017	Gillig BRT 35'		Snow chain equipped; used on 674, 675, and 677; ski service Special mountain wrap and large rear doors for ski service.
17101–17125		Timpanogos	2017	New Flyer XDE60		Used on route 830X (UVX); BRT style bus with doors on the left side.
18001–18024	18001–18015	Meadowbrook	2018	Gillig BRT 40'		
18001–18024	18016–18020	Ogden	2018	Gillig BRT 40'		
18001–18024	18021–18024	Depot District	2018	Gillig BRT 40'		
18101–18102		Ogden	2018	Gillig Trolley 35'		Mainly used on routes 601, 628, 667
18103–18104		Ogden	2018	Gillig Trolley 29'		Mainly used on routes 601, 628, 667
18151–18153		Depot District	2018	New Flyer XE40		Electric buses.
19001–19010		Meadowbrook	2019	Gillig BRT 40'		
20001–20010		Meadowbrook	2020	Gillig Low Floor 40'		First buses to receive the new streamlined UTA livery.
20051–20059		Meadowbrook	2020	Gillig Low Floor 35'		Snow chain equipped Special mountain wrap and large rear doors for ski service.
21001–21023	21001–21014	Timpanogos	2021	Gillig Low Floor 40'		Snow chain equipped 21015–21023 are used for Ski Service on routes 972, and 994.
21001–21023	21015–21023	Meadowbrook	2021	Gillig Low Floor 40'		Snow chain equipped 21015–21023 are used for Ski Service on routes 972, and 994.
21071–21097	21071–21089	Ogden	2021	MCI D45 CRT LE		
21071–21097	21090–21097	Timpanogos	2021	MCI D45 CRT LE		
22001–22020		Timpanogos	2022	Gillig Low Floor 40'		Snow chain equipped
22101–22111		Ogden	2022	Gillig Low Floor Plus 40' Battery Electric		Electric Busses. Used on Route 603X (OGX) and Route 602 (Wildcat Shuttle)
23001–23032		Meadowbrook	2023	Gillig Low Floor 40'		First buses to receive L9 with 350hp. Snow chain equipped. 23001-23002 are used for Ski Service on routes 972, and 994.
23041–23046		Meadowbrook	2023	Gillig Low Floor Suburban 40'		To run route 451-Tooele Fast Bus. Coach style seating.
23101–23120		Depot District	2023	Gillig Low Floor Plus 40' Battery Electric		Electric Busses. Snow chain equipped
24001–24012		Depot District	2024	Gillig Low Floor Plus 40' CNG		CNG busses.
25001-25022		Depot District	2025	Gillig Low Floor Plus 40' CNG		CNG busses.
25101–25105		Ogden	2025	Gillig Low Floor Plus 40' Battery Electric		Electric Busses. Used on routes 603X (OGX) and 602 (Wildcat Shuttle)

=== Light rail ===
Model	Image	Fleet numbers	Manufactured	Notes
Siemens SD-100		1001–1023	1998	Primarily used for the Blue Line.
Siemens SD-160		1024–1033	2001	Primarily used for the Blue line.
Siemens SD-160		1034-1040	2003	Primarily used for the Blue line.
Siemens S70		1101–1177	2010–2012	Also used on the S-Line.

=== Commuter rail ===
Model	Image	Manufactured	Road numbers	Number in fleet	Notes
MPXpress MP36PH-3C locomotives		2007	1–21	18	#12, was leased to the Northstar Line and subsequently acquired by Northstar in June 2010. #13 and #14 were sold to the MBTA in 2011.
Bi-level Bombardier cab cars		2006	101–122	22	Used to run trains southbound without having to turn the entire train around.
Bi-level Bombardier coaches		2007	201–216	16	Coach Cars. Equipped with bike racks.

== Change Day ==
UTA periodically adjusts its bus, TRAX, S-Line and FrontRunner schedules to meet changing ridership needs. Unless an urgent need arises, such as when a fairly major adjustment to resolve connections with the FrontRunner was made in February 2013, UTA generally limits Change Days to the spring, summer, and late fall of each year—called Spring, Summer, and Winter Change Day, respectively. Changes can include new routes, elimination of routes, route changes, and schedule changes. Many of UTA's seasonal bus routes (such as ski bus service) also either begin or end on Change Days.

== Accessibility ==
All of UTA's TRAX and FrontRunner trains and stations, streetcars and streetcar stops, and buses are compliant with Americans with Disabilities Act and are therefore accessible to those with disabilities. (Note: "Accessible UTA". www.rideuta.com. Utah Transit Authority.) Signage at the stations, on the passenger platforms, and on the trains and streetcars clearly indicate accessibility options. Ramps on the passenger platform and assistance from the train operator may be necessary for wheelchair boarding on high-floor Blue Line vehicles only; these ramps are not used on the Red or Green Lines. In accordance with the Utah Clean Air Act and UTA ordinance, smoking is prohibited on UTA property.

== Park-&-Ride ==
There are numerous free Park-&-Ride lots throughout UTA's operational area. Many are operated by UTA in conjunction with its TRAX and FrontRunner stations or other transit centers, but others are maintained by the Utah Department of Transportation (UDOT). In addition, The Church of Jesus Christ of Latter-day Saints (LDS Church) has designated many of its meetinghouses' parking lots for use as well. Some Park & Ride lots offer 24-hour parking, while others offer extended or multi-day parking.

UTA operates parking garages in conjunction with two of its stations, the Jordan Valley TRAX station in West Jordan and the Draper FrontRunner station in Draper. UTA also has a "kiss-and-ride" lot at the Draper FrontRunner station. The only parking provided at the Draper station is within the parking garage. There was also parking available on the nearby street before the city of Draper prohibited parking along FrontRunner Boulevard.

== Funding ==
=== UTA funding sources ===
- Local option sales tax – 51 percent
- Capital Sources – 25 percent
- UTA Fund Balance – 7 percent
- Federal Preventive Maintenance – 10 percent
- Passenger Revenue – 4 percent
- Other – 3 percent

=== Fares ===
UTA's bus fares are fixed price, based on the service type, with express routes costing more. As of April 1, 2013, the basic bus and TRAX fare is US$2.50, and Paratransit is US$4 A fare on one mode of transit will usually transfer to another (e.g., bus to TRAX, FrontRunner to TRAX or bus, etc.). Paper and electronic transfers are issued and valid for use on other buses, TRAX and the S-Line. Fares on FrontRunner are distance-based and can be transferred to TRAX or bus, but TRAX or bus fare cannot be transferred to FrontRunner without purchase of an upgrade. Exemptions apply to kids below 6, who ride free with fare-paying rider (up to three kids).

Numerous fare products and a variety of discounts and discount passes are available for eligible riders. These include all day and monthly passes purchased at local stores; passes for college students, minors, and seniors; Group Passes; and employer-sponsored passes. Ticket machines at all FrontRunner, TRAX and S-Line stations accept cash and major debit and credit cards. While ticket machines provide change for cash purchases, cash paying riders must have the exact fare amount upon boarding buses, as change is not available.

In 2009, UTA launched an automated fare collection system (ARC) to collect fares with contactless smart cards. As the first full AFC system in the United States to accept contactless bank cards, the UTA system, implemented in conjunction with Vix Technology, received the 2009 Innovation Award from the American Public Transportation Association and the 2009 Sesames Transportation Award.

FAREPAY is a prepaid card accepted on any UTA operated transportation, except paratransit. The cards can be purchased online or a UTA customer service center, as well as select retailers. The cards have a one-time US$3 activation fee, but can then be loaded (or reloaded) with as little as US$5 or as much as US$500. Reloading of cards may also be done online or at a UTA customer service center, as well as the same select retailers that sell the cards. On August 18, 2024, FAREPAY switched from a percentage discount off other payment methods to a daily and weekly fare cap.

UTA currently has a Free Fare Zone in downtown Salt Lake City which allows transportation patrons that both enter and exit bus or TRAX service within the zone to ride at no charge. The zone was originally created in 1985 and covers an area of approximately 36 city blocks. The boundaries are roughly North Temple, 200 East, 500 South and 400 West. TRAX stations within the zone include Arena, City Center, Courthouse, Gallivan Plaza, Planetarium, and Temple Square. In addition, the Free Fare Zone also includes the area of the State Capitol (north to 500 North), the bus stops on 400 South between 200 East and 300 East, and three additional TRAX stations: Library, Old GreekTown, and Salt Lake Central. In June 2012 UTA revealed plans to eliminate the Free Fare Zone, but by September 2012 it announced that it would continue the zone, but with some minor adjustments, including when and how fares are collected for service ending outside the zone.

UTA fares have not increased since 2013. In 2016, UTA published information showing that the US$2.50 cash fare is comparable to other mid-sized agencies. When the US$1.50 FAREPAY fare is taken into consideration, the fare is lower than many other similar public transit agencies.

== Leadership and operation ==
On July 1, 2026, the Transit Commission of the Utah Transit Authority assumed governance of UTA following the passage of Senate Bill 197. This seven-member commission comprises four at-large members—two appointed by each the Utah Senate and Utah House—and three geographically based members nominated by local government councils, appointed by the governor, and confirmed by the senate.

Until June 30, 2026, UTA was governed by a three-member Board of Trustees appointed by the city and county governments that fund UTA with a local option sales taxes.

In July 2013, the Transportation Security Administration (TSA) announced that for the year 2012 UTA had earned the "Gold Standard", TSA's highest security rating. TSA also reported that UTA was among only fifteen other mass transit agencies to have earned this rating for the same period.

In 2025, the American Public Transportation Association (APTA) awarded UTA the Outstanding Public Transportation System Award in the size category of 15–50 million annual passenger trips.

Higher salaries of executives has been an issue. In 2015, UTA executives opted out of receiving an increase in their compensation and also refused to receive any of their usual annual bonuses for the 2015 and 2016 annual periods. UTA also revised its compensation policy on May 19, 2015, to bring those who are earning less than those in similar job functions at other transit organizations in line with the industry standards.

UTA's current executive director is Jay Fox. In 2022, his salary was reported to be $247,918—415 percent higher than the average Utah Transit Authority employee's salary, which was reported to be $48,163.

=== Transit centers ===
UTA operates three transit centers which are staffed by customer service personnel during business hours Monday through Friday (except holidays) at Ogden Central station, Provo Central station and on 700 West in Salt Lake City. All other transportation hubs operated by UTA (including Salt Lake Central, Central Pointe, Murray Central, West Valley Central, and Orem Central stations) are not staffed by customer service personnel.

=== Police department ===
UTA also operates a law enforcement arm, the Utah Transit Authority Police Department. The department conducts law enforcement services, criminal investigations and public safety throughout bus transit, commuter rail, and light rail systems.

== FrontLines 2015 ==
The purpose of the FrontLines 2015 project was to meet the increasing transportation needs of the Wasatch Front's growing population. It consisted of expansions to both TRAX and FrontRunner and was the largest expansion in UTA's history. UTA relied heavily on sales tax revenues to fund this project. On December 10, 2012, the FrontRunner South extension opened for service and extended the previous line 45 miles (72 km) south from Salt Lake City to Provo. This new expansion allows commuters to travel from Provo to Salt Lake City in less than one hour. FrontRunner South was an extension of the previous line, which ran north from Downtown Salt Lake City to Pleasant View in north Weber County. FrontLines 2015 added/expanded four extensions in the TRAX system including the Mid-Jordan extension, the West Valley City extension, the airport extension, and the Draper extension. While all the projects were set to be completed by the year 2015, all of them were completed well ahead of schedule. The mid-Jordan TRAX and West Valley extensions both opened August 7, 2011, and the airport extension opened April 14, 2013, followed by the Draper extension on August 18, 2013. Just prior to the opening of the Draper extension in August 2013, UTA announced that the FrontLines 2015 project had been completed under budget and years ahead of schedule.

== See also ==
- Transportation in Salt Lake City
