= Ogden Central station =

Commuter rail station in Ogden, Utah, United States

Ogden Central
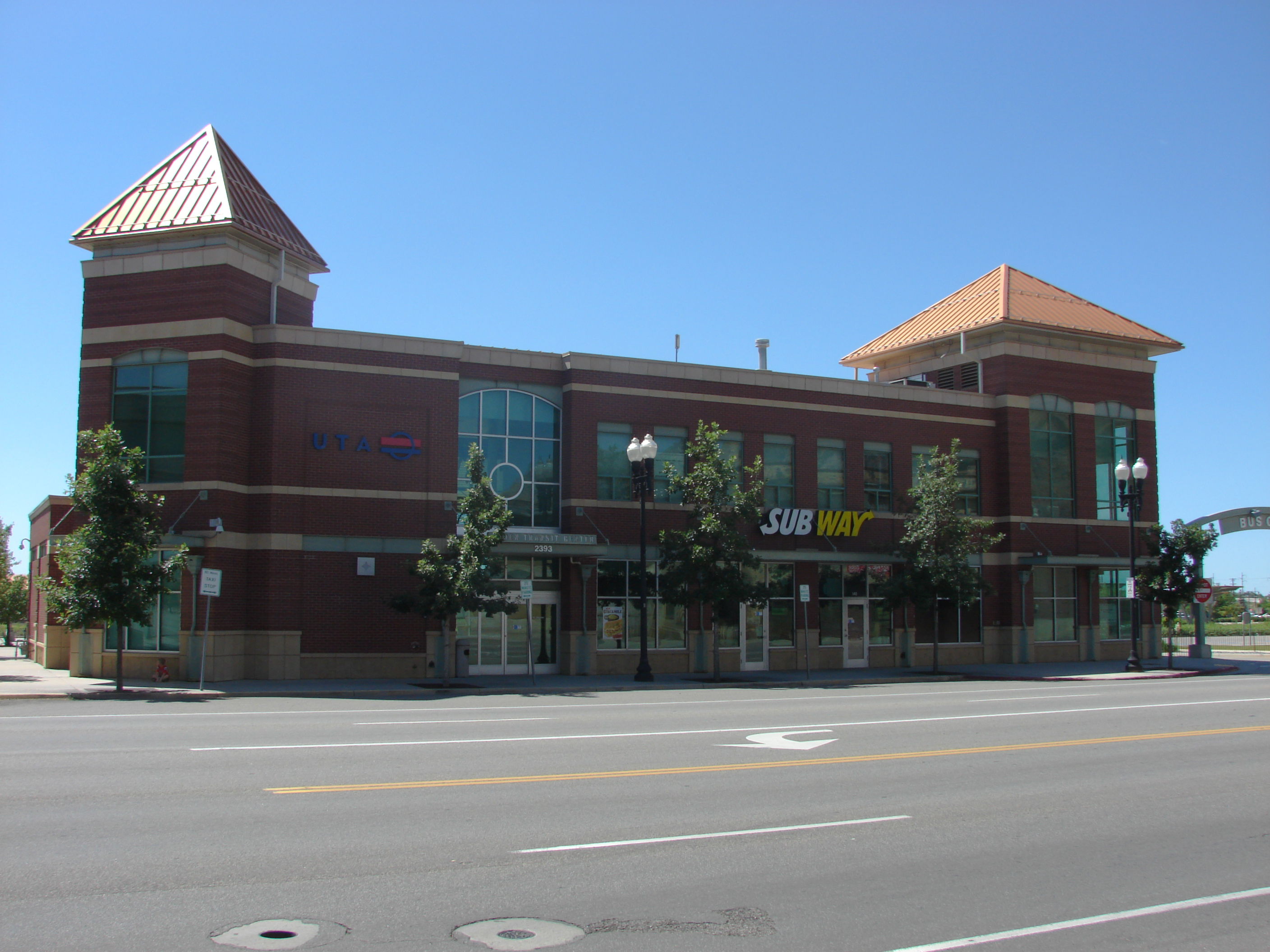
- Ogden Central station building, June 2015

General information
- Location: 2393 South Wall Avenue; Ogden, Utah; United States
- Coordinates: 41°13′28″N 111°58′50″W
- Owner: Utah Transit Authority (UTA)
- Platforms: 1 island platform
- Tracks: 3
- Bus stands: 12
- Connections: UTA: OGX , 455, 470, 473, 601, 604, 613, F618, F620, 630, 674, 675; Greyhound Lines; Le Bus: Wendover Fun Bus

Construction
- Parking: 476 spaces
- Accessible: Yes

History
- Opened: January 22, 2002
- Former names: Ogden Intermodal Transit Center

Key dates
- April 26, 2008: FrontRunner service begins
- August 20, 2023: Ogden Express service begins

Services
Preceding station	Utah Transit Authority	Following station
Terminus	FrontRunner	Roy toward Provo Central
Location

Ogden Central station is a commuter rail train and bus station in Ogden, Utah, United States. It is served by the FrontRunner, Utah Transit Authority's (UTA) commuter rail train, the Ogden Express, a UTA bus rapid transit service, as well as UTA local and commuter bus service, and Greyhound Lines long-distance bus service.

== Description ==
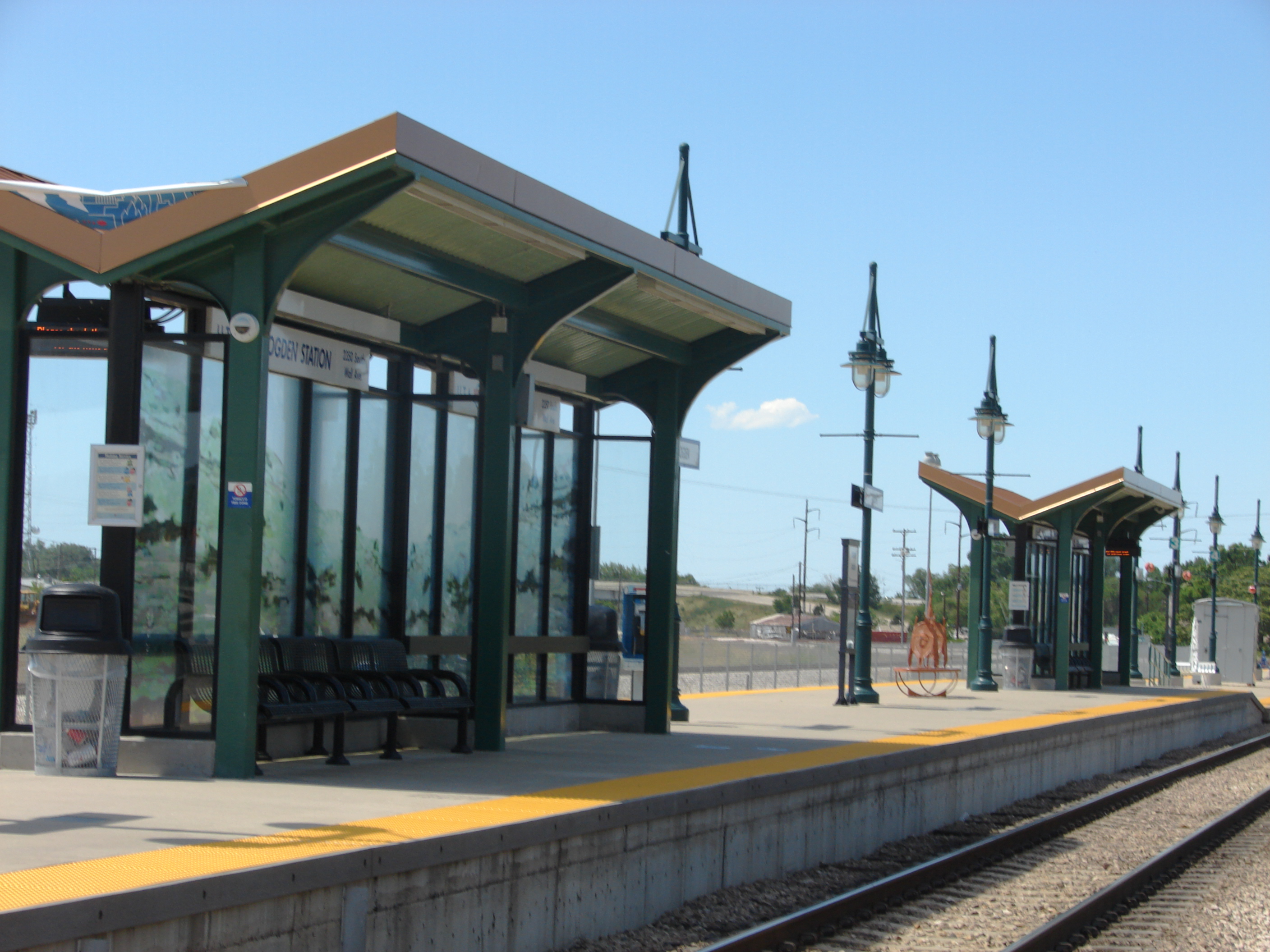
The FrontRunner passenger platform at Ogden Central station, June 2015

Ogden Central station (officially known as the "Ogden Intermodal Transit Center" until August 20, 2023). is frequently referred to by various names, even by UTA itself. Other names include the Ogden Station, the Ogden Intermodal Center, the Ogden Transit Center, and the "Ogden Intermodal Bus Station." However, it should not be confused with the Ogden Union Station, which is a train station just south of Ogden Central station (which has not had rail service since May 1997).

The station was built on approximately 15 acres (6.1 ha) of land and opened in 2002 with UTA bus service only. The FrontRunner construction was later completed to provide commuter rail service. The FrontRunner train service began in 2008. It is anticipated that if Amtrak (the National Railroad Passenger Corporation) should ever resume passenger rail service to Ogden (particularly the Pioneer) the Transit Center would be used as the stop.

The station located at 2350 South Wall Avenue (Utah State Route 204). However, even though it is adjacent to 24th Street (Utah State Route 53), Wall Avenue has limited access from 24th Street (2400 South). The station has a free Park and Ride lot with about 475 parking spaces available. It is located within the Quiet Zone, so trains do not routinely sound their horns when approaching public crossings within this corridor. The station's interior is locked on weekends.

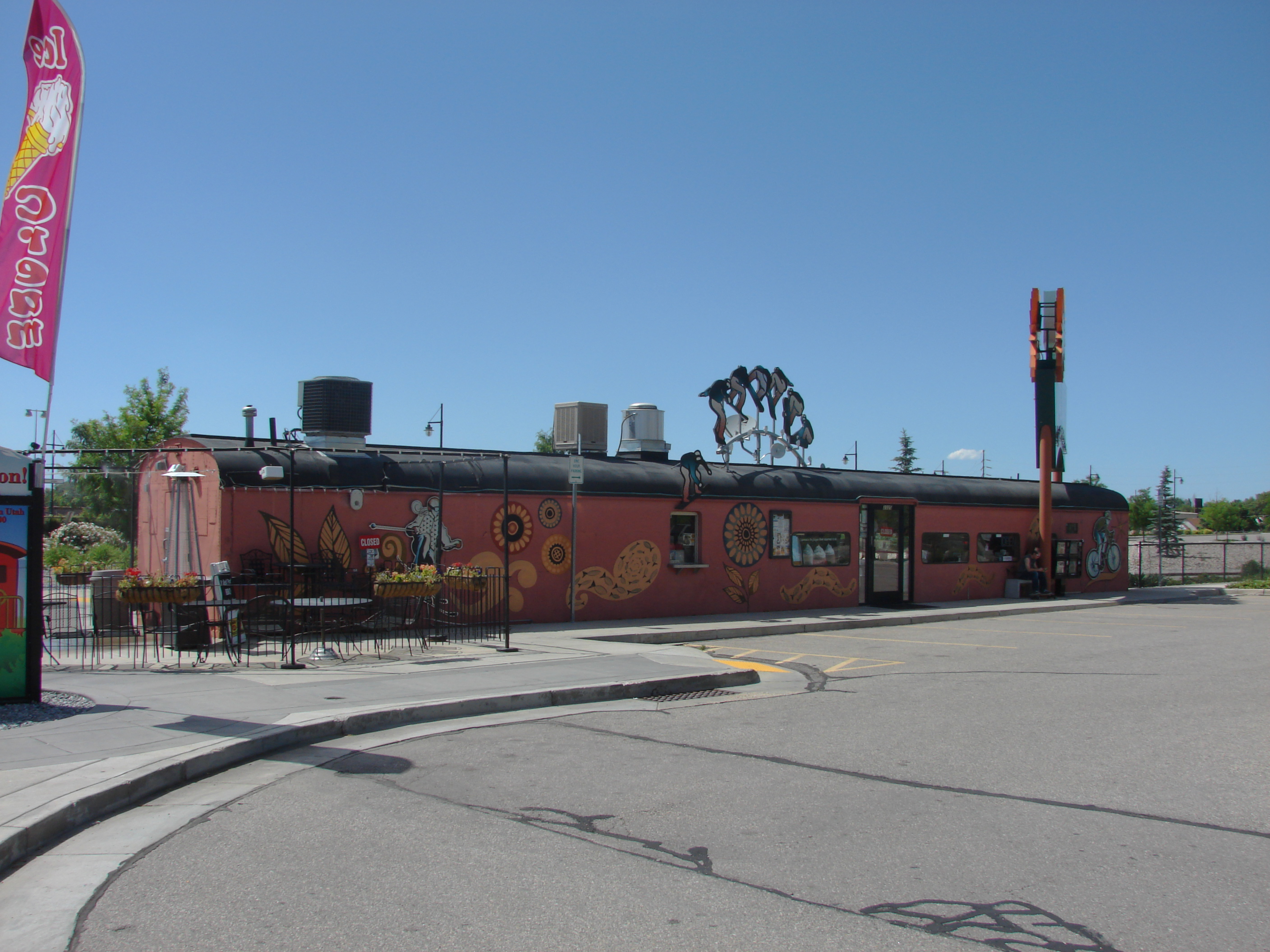
The Zephyr Grill restaurant at Ogden Central station, June 2015

The Zephyr Grill, a short-order restaurant, is located within a former Railcar situated north of the bus stands, between the main Park and Ride lot and the FrontRunner passenger platform. As of August 2023, Ogden Central is the only UTA station (for the FrontRunner, TRAX, streetcar, or bus) that has a food service provider.

The station is north of, and just across the street from, the Ogden Union Station (home to the Utah State Railroad Museum, Browning-Kimball Classic Car Museum and Browning Firearms Museum) as well as Historic 25th Street. Ogden historically, until the early 1970s, the station served frequent trains going northwest to Oregon and Washington and east to Chicago. Within walking distance is the downtown Ogden district, including The Junction and associated attractions: Treehouse Museum, iFly, and Megaplex 13.

== History ==
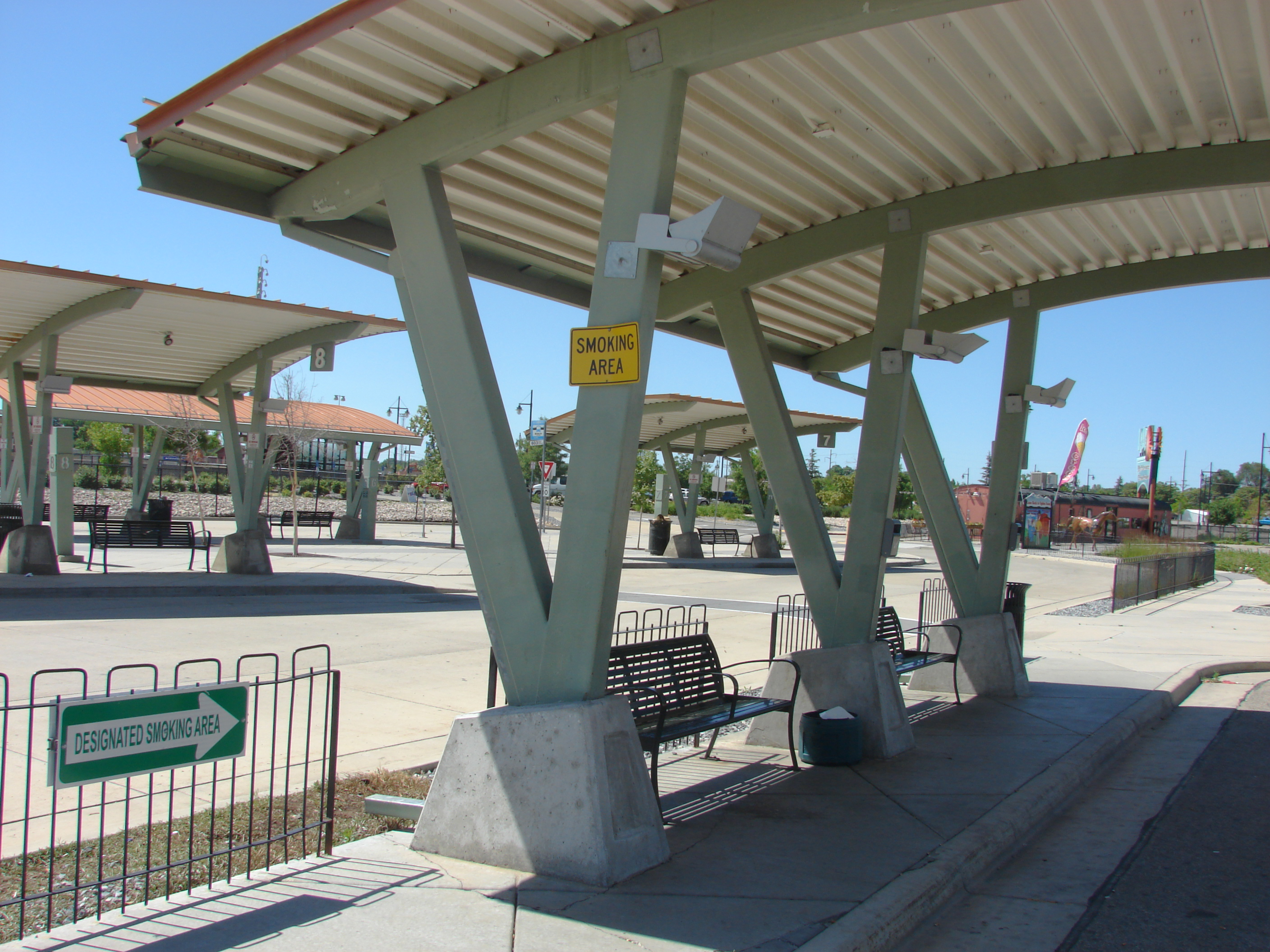
Ogden Central station's designated smoking area, June 2015

The station is located next to a railroad yard that has been active since 1869, when the first transcontinental railroad reached the area. Because of its long use as a railroad yard and the accompanying hazardous waste. it was also a Superfund site. Therefore, as part of the construction, UTA was required to have a groundwater and soil management plan. As a result of the overall efforts in this development of brownfield, UTA and Ogden City received the Phoenix Award from the Phoenix Awards Institute.

Initial plans for the station began in the late 1990s. At that time, the envisioned transportation hub included most of the current features but also included the possibility of at satellite terminal for the Ogden-Hinckley Airport. The estimated cost for the new transit center was $12–15 million (equivalent to $24.07- 30.08 million in 2025). A few years later, United States Congress authorized $285.4 million (equivalent to $551.587 million in 2025) million for transportation project Utah, $800,000 (equivalent to $1.55 million in 2025) of which was earmarked for a new transit center in Ogden.

With the opening of the Ogden Express on August 20, 2023, the official name of the station was changed from the Ogden Intermodal Transit Center to Ogden Central station.

== Services ==
=== FrontRunner ===
On weekdays the FrontRunner has about twenty-three round trips between Ogden and Provo (through Salt Lake City) and about five more round trips between Ogden and Downtown Salt Lake City. On Saturdays, there are only nineteen round trips between Ogden and Provo. Trains run hourly from about 4:30 am to just after midnight on weekdays (with additional half-hour runs for the morning and evening commutes). Saturdays have hourly runs from about 6:00 am to 2:30 am Sunday morning.

=== Ogden Express ===
The Ogden Express (OGX) is a bus rapid transit line that connects the station with the McKay-Dee Hospital via Weber State University. It began service on August 20, 2023.

=== Utah Transit Authority Bus ===
The Utah Transit Authority operates several bus routes from the bus bays at the station. As of Change Day, August 20, 2023, they include: 455, 470, 473, 601, 604, 613, F618, F620, 630, 674, and 675.

=== Long-distance bus services ===
Greyhound Lines stops at Ogden Central station on its route between Boise, Idaho and Salt Lake City.

Local bus company Le Bus operates the Fun Bus between West Wendover, Nevada and the Salt Lake City area also stops at Ogden Central station.

== Future plans ==
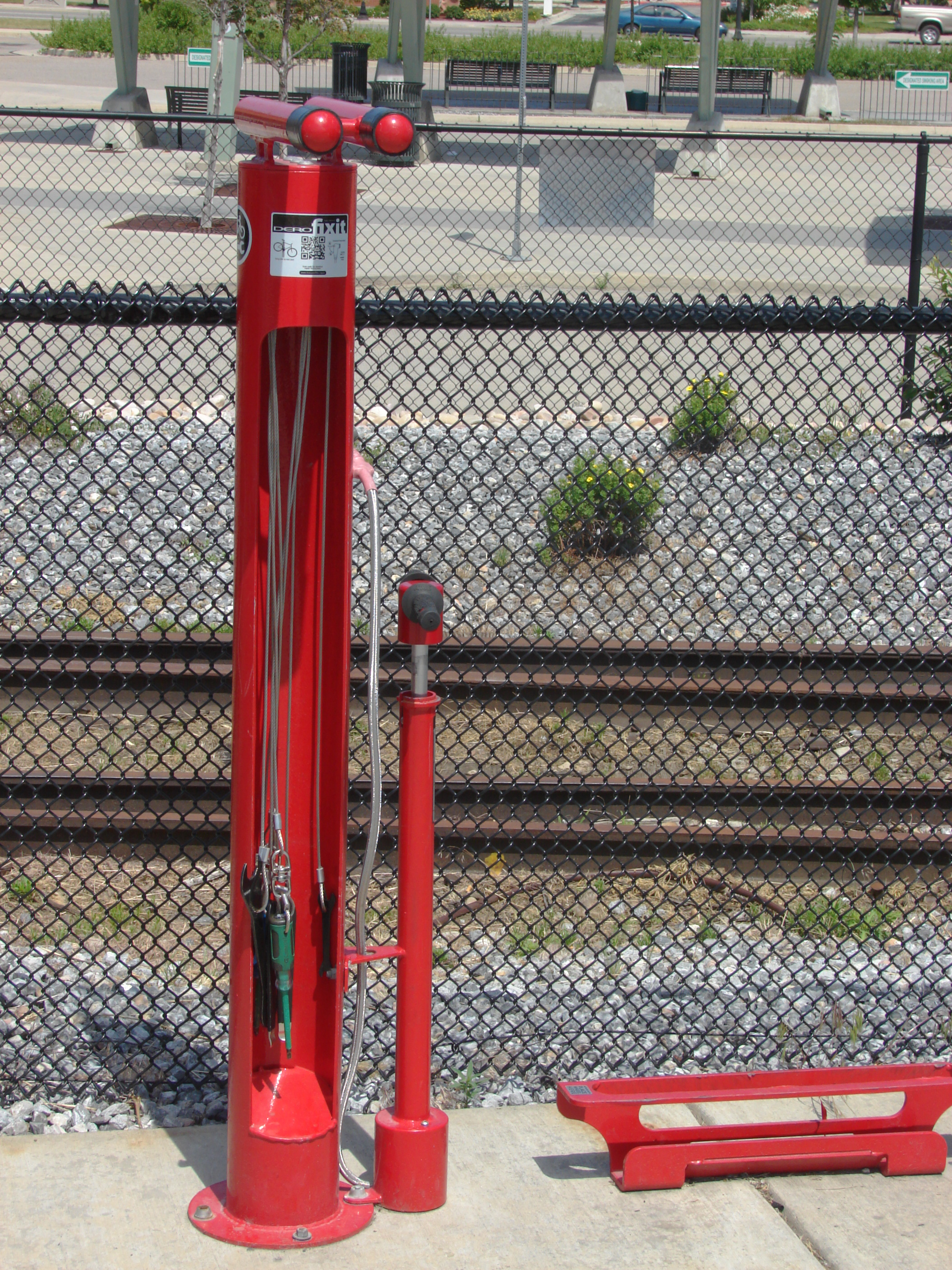
Bicycle repair stand at Ogden Central station, June 2015

UTA and the Wasatch Front Regional Council (WFRC) have outlined a number of plans that directly or indirectly involve the Ogden Intermodal Transit Center. Among these projects are the following:

- Preservation of the rail corridor for future extension of the FrontRunner north to Brigham City, as well as an upgrade to the existing line north to Pleasant View station
- Bus rapid transit (BRT) & Enhanced Bus along the West Weber-West Davis Corridor (Ogden Central station – Ogden central business district (CBD) – Newgate Mall – Riverdale – Ogden Airport – Roy Station – West Haven – Clinton – West Point – Syracuse – Clearfield Station – Hill Air Force Base (HAFB) South Gate Bus Transit Hub – Layton Hills Mall – Layton Station)
- BRT & Enhanced Bus along the North Ogden-Salt Lake Corridor (North Ogden – Washington Boulevard – Ogden Central station – Newgate Mall – Riverdale – Ogden Airport – Falcon Hill Transitway – HAFB South Gate Bus Transit Hub – Clearfiield Station – Layton Main Street – Layton Station – Kaysville – Fruit Heights – Farmington Station – Downtown Farmington – Centerville – Bountiful Main Street – Woods Cross – North Salt Lake – Salt Lake City 400 West – 200 South Bus Transit Hub)
