= Midvalley Express =

Bus rapid transit line in Salt Lake County, Utah, United States

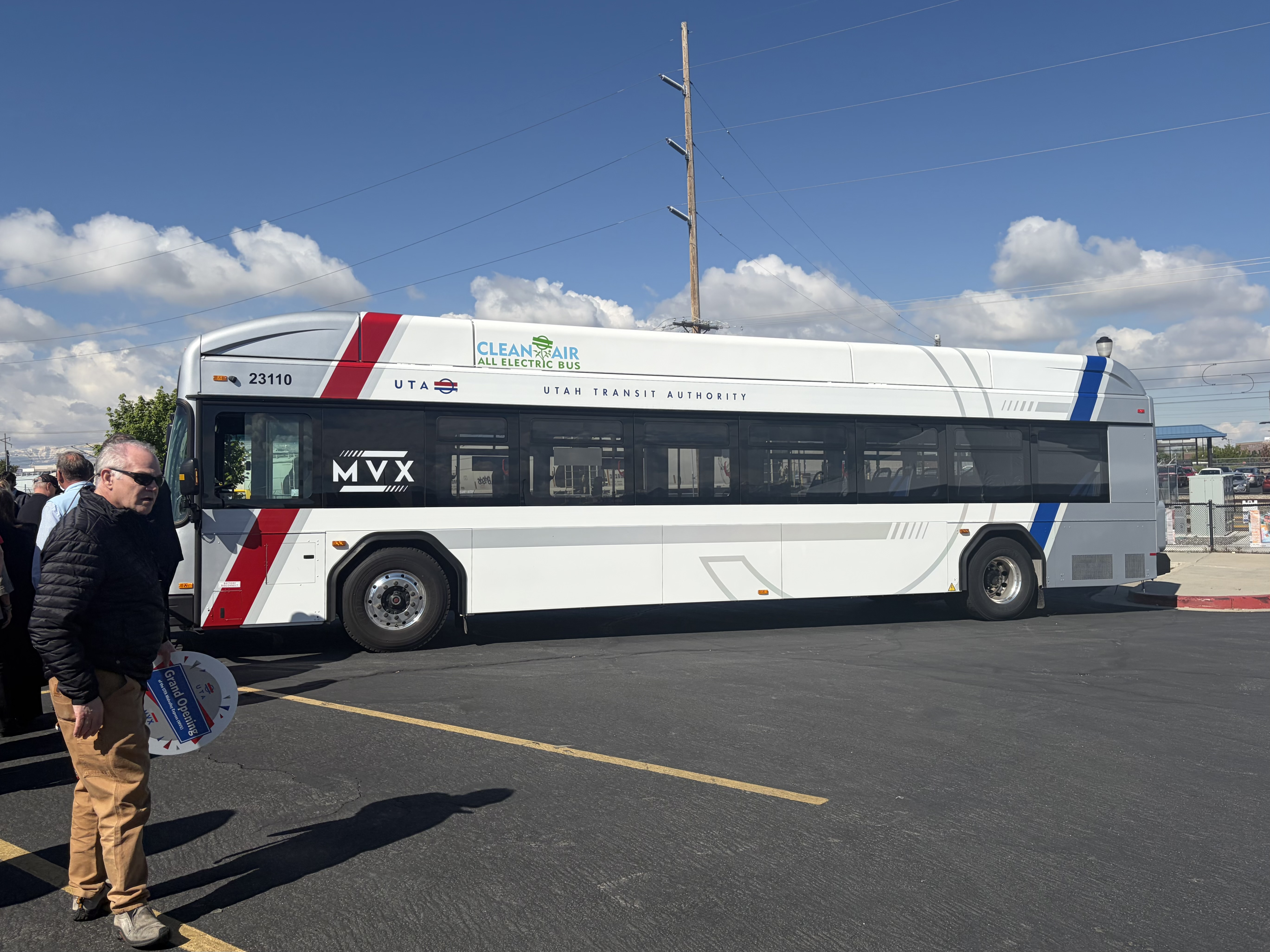
- A typical electric MVX bus staged at Murray Central

Overview
- Owner: Utah Transit Authority (UTA)
- Locale: Murray, Taylorsville, & West Valley City, Utah, U.S.
- Termini: Murray Central station; West Valley Central station
- Stations: 15

Service
- Type: Bus rapid transit (BRT)
- Route number: 50X
- Operator: UTA
- Depot: Depot District
- Daily ridership: 2,200 (anticipated)

History
- Opened: April 12, 2026

Technical
- Line length: 7 mi (11 km)
- Operating speed: 50 mph (80 km/h) max.

The Midvalley Express (MVX), originally known as the Taylorsville-Murray BRT and later as Midvalley Connector) is a bus rapid transit (BRT) line, running between Murray and West Valley City (passing through Taylorsville) in Utah, United States, that is operated by the Utah Transit Authority (UTA). It connects the main campus of Salt Lake Community College (SLCC) in Taylorsville with both the TRAX light rail system and the FrontRunner commuter rail. It is the third operating BRT line that UTA has entered service along the Wasatch Front. Bus Rapid Transit is described by UTA as "light rail on rubber tires".

== Description ==
MVX connects Murray Central station with the West Valley Central station, connecting with the Intermountain Medical Center, Sorensen Research Park, Salt Lake Community College Taylorsville Redwood Campus, and the Calvin Rampton Complex (which houses the Utah Department of Transportation, the Utah Department of Public Safety Driver License Division, and the Department of Technology Services) along the way. About a fifth of the approximately 7-mile (11 km) route is in dedicated lanes along 4500/4700 South (Taylorsville Expressway/Utah State Route 266) with the other four-fifths running along various city streets. There are fifteen stations for the line. Transit signal priority is used at all signalized intersections. It began construction in the Spring of 2024, with construction originally anticipated to conclude during Fall 2026, but service was started ahead of schedule on April 12, 2026.

== Route ==
Unofficial Midvalley Express route map. Station names/locations are subject to change.

UTA has assigned MVX the route number 50X.

=== Murray ===
MVX begins its route at Murray Central station, with connections to the Red and Blue TRAX lines and FrontRunner, in the southernmost bus bay, Bay A. It leaves the bus-only loop using the southern exit at the intersection of Cottonwood Street and 100 West, turning north onto Cottonwood Street. It continues north on Cottonwood Street until reaching the intersection with Vine Street, where it turns west. After crossing the intersection with 300 West/Commerce Drive, it reaches the Vine Street station. From there, it crosses over Interstate 15 and turns north onto Murray Boulevard, reaching the Murray Boulevard station at approximately 5030 South. Continuing north, it turns west onto 4800 South/Murray-Taylorsville Road where it crosses the Jordan River and Jordan River Parkway Trail.

=== Taylorsville ===
After crossing the Jordan River, MVX leaves the city of Murray and enters Taylorsville. Turning north onto Sunstone Road, it follows the road as it curves to the northeast before reaching the Sunstone Road station. Turning north onto Atherton Drive at the end of Sunstone Road, it continues north where the Atherton East station is located (at approximately 4595 South.) At the intersection with 4500/4700 South, it uses a bus-only left turn lane to turn west into the median guideway and reach the Riverboat Road station.

It continues down 4500/4700 South in dedicated lanes, stopping at the Atherton West and 1300 West stations. The guideway ends east of Redwood Road (SR 68), after which MVX turns north onto Redwood Road from another bus-only turn lane, then west onto Community Boulevard, before turning north once again to reach the transit center on the Salt Lake Community College Campus. Exiting the transit center loop, it turns south onto Redwood Road and then west onto 4700 South. It continues west to reach the 2200 West station, the final stop within Taylorsville.

=== West Valley City ===
MVX leaves Taylorsville and enters West Valley by crossing under Interstate 215 and turning north onto 2700 West. The route continues north on 2700 West, stopping at the 4700 South 2700 West (near the Calvin Rampton Complex), 4500 South (serving the state complex and American Express offices), 4100 South, and 3800 South stations. The route will reach its northwestern terminus by turning west onto 3650 South and entering West Valley Central station’s bus loop, where it connects with the TRAX Green line.

The return route from West Valley to Murray is the same with one exception; the eastbound Riverboat Road stop is located on the curbside, rather than in the median of the road.

== Stops ==
Stops are listed from east to west.

Midvalley Express (Murray – Taylorsville)
Stop name	City	Eastbound station/stop	Westbound station/stop	UTA bus connections (Note: Bus connection routes are current as of Change Day, 12 April 2026)	Date opened	Park and Ride lot	Notes & other connections
Eastern end of the line
Murray Central	Murray	5144 Cottonwood St		45, 54, 200, 201	April 12, 2026	Yes	Blue Line; Red Line; FrontRunner; Serves the Intermountain Medical Center
Vine Street	Murray	310 West Vine St		54	April 12, 2026	No	
Murray Boulevard	Murray	5030 South Murray Blvd			April 12, 2026	No	
Sunstone Road	Taylorsville	4640 Sunstone Rd			April 12, 2026	No	
Atherton East	Taylorsville	4595 South Atherton Dr			April 12, 2026	No	
Riverboat Road	Taylorsville	800 West 4480 South		47	April 12, 2026	No	Westbound stop is in the median; eastbound stop is on south side Route 47 stops directly at MVX platform
Atherton West	Taylorsville	1100 West 4540 South		47	April 12, 2026	No	Route 47 stops directly at MVX platform
1300 West	Taylorsville	1300 West 4700 South		47	April 12, 2026	No	Route 47 stops directly at MVX platform
SLCC—Taylorsville	Taylorsville			47, 217, 227	April 12, 2026	No	Stop is at the SLCC Transit Hub; Salt Lake Community College
2200 West	Taylorsville	2200 West 4700 South		47, 227*	April 12, 2026	No	Route 47 stops directly at MVX platform
4700 South 2700 West	West Valley City			47*, 227*	April 12, 2026	No	
4500 South	West Valley City	4400 South 2700 West			April 12, 2026	No	
4100 South	West Valley City	2700 West 4100 South			April 12, 2026	No	
3800 South	West Valley City	2700 West 3800 South		39	April 12, 2026	No	Route 39 stops directly at the northbound platform; its eastbound stop is adjacent, on 3800 South.
West Valley Central	West Valley City	2750 West 3590 South		35, 39, F232, 240, 248, 509, 513	April 12, 2026	Yes	Green Line
Western end of the line
* Indicates bus connections which do not connect directly at stop, but are easily accessible

== See also ==
- Utah Transit Authority
- Utah Transit Authority bus rapid transit
- FrontRunner
- TRAX (light rail)
