= UTA On Demand =

On-demand microtransit service in Utah

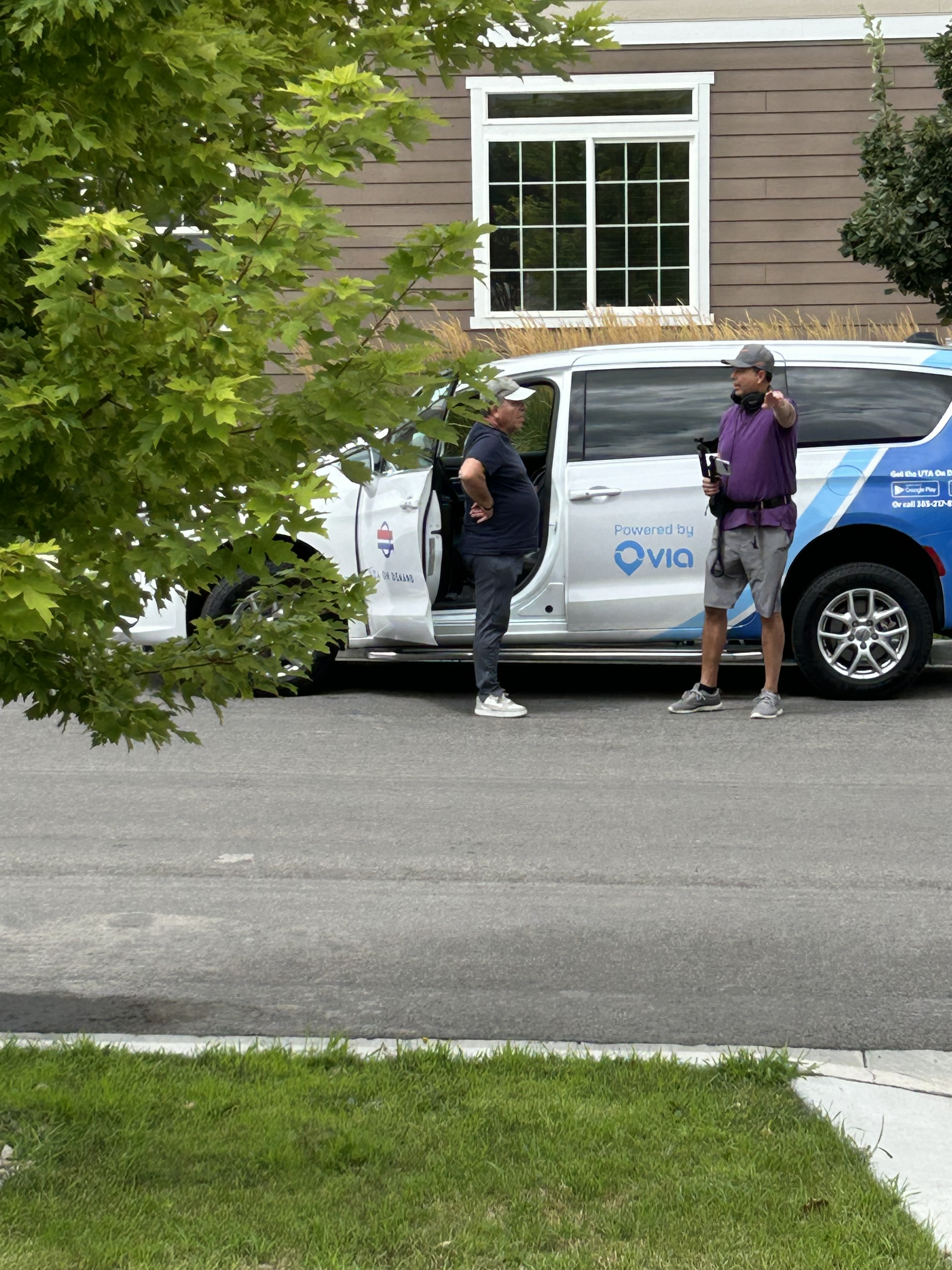
- A UTA On Demand vehicle in 2026

Overview
- Owner: Utah Transit Authority
- Area served: Selected areas of Utah
- Locale: Utah, United States
- Transit type: Microtransit

Operation
- Began operation: November 2019
- Operator: Utah Transit Authority

UTA On Demand is an on-demand microtransit service provided by the Utah Transit Authority (UTA) in Utah. The service combines elements of conventional public transit and ridesharing, allowing passengers to request shared rides within designated service zones. Trips are routed dynamically, and the service is intended in part to connect riders with UTA's bus and rail network.

== History ==
UTA launched its first on-demand microtransit pilot in southern Salt Lake County in November 2019 in partnership with transportation technology company Via. The initial service covered communities including Bluffdale, Draper, Herriman, Riverton and South Jordan. After nearly two years as a pilot, UTA made the service permanent in August 2021, replacing several Flex bus routes in the area.

UTA subsequently expanded On Demand to Salt Lake City's west side in late 2021 and to portions of Davis and Tooele counties in 2022. The west-side service experienced rapid early growth; KSL reported that ride requests increased 930 percent between December 2021 and September 2022.

The service reached the Provo–Orem area of Utah County in 2025. In August 2026, UTA expanded it into northern Utah County, including Alpine, American Fork, Cedar Hills, Eagle Mountain, Highland, Lehi, Lindon, Pleasant Grove and Saratoga Springs. The expansion became UTA's sixth On Demand service zone.
