= McKay-Dee Hospital =

- Intermountain Healthcare

Geography
- Location: Ogden, Utah, United States
- Coordinates: 41°11′00″N 111°57′15″W

Organization
- Care system: Public
- Type: Community

Services
- Emergency department: Level II trauma center
- Beds: 310

History
- Founded: 1910

Links
- Website: Official website
- Lists: Hospitals in Utah

McKay-Dee Hospital is a not-for-profit health system operated by Intermountain Healthcare. It is located in Ogden, Utah, United States. With 310 licensed beds, it is the third largest hospital in the Intermountain system, and the fourth largest hospital in Utah. Although not directly affiliated with the university, it is located just southwest of the main campus of Weber State University.

McKay-Dee Hospital offers nationally ranked programs including the Heart and Vascular Institute and Newborn ICU. Other programs include the Huntsman-Intermountain Cancer Center, McKay-Dee Spine Institute, Emergency and Trauma Services and the new Stewart Rehab Center. McKay-Dee Hospital serves northern Utah and portions of southeast Idaho and western Wyoming.

== History ==
Dee Hospital around 1920

The original Thomas D. Dee Memorial Hospital at 24th Street and Harrison Boulevard in Ogden was founded on December 29, 1910, by Annie Taylor Dee and her children as a memorial to their husband and father, Thomas Duncombe Dee. In 1915, the Church of Jesus Christ of Latter-day Saints (LDS Church) became the owners of the hospital.

The original hospital facility closed on July 12, 1969, with its patients transferring to the new David O. McKay Hospital at 3939 Harrison Boulevard. The Dee, as it was known for 59 years, began a second life on November 10, 1971, when a new hospital bearing the same name opened its doors adjacent to the McKay Hospital, as an integral part of the McKay-Dee Medical Center. The new Dee Hospital provided care for less-intensive cases, as opposed to its neighboring McKay Hospital.

On April 1, 1975, the LDS Church transferred its private hospital system, including McKay-Dee, to the newly created Intermountain Health Care. In March 2002, a new McKay-Dee Hospital campus was opened less than a mile to the south of the former location.

== Hospital rating data ==
The HealthGrades website contains the clinical quality data for Intermountain McKay-Dee Hospital, as of 2017. For this rating section three different types of data from HealthGrades are presented: clinical quality ratings for thirty-one inpatient conditions and procedures, thirteen patient safety indicators and the percentage of patients giving the hospital as a 9 or 10 (the two highest possible ratings).

For inpatient conditions and procedures, there are three possible ratings: worse than expected, as expected, better than expected. For this hospital the data for this category is:

- Worse than expected - 0
- As expected - 23
- Better than expected - 8

For patient safety indicators, there are the same three possible ratings. For this hospital safety indicators were rated as:

- Worse than expected - 1
- As expected - 11
- Better than expected - 1

Percentage of patients rating this hospital as a 9 or 10 - 77% Percentage of patients who on average rank hospitals as a 9 or 10 - 69%
