= Mount Timpanogos Transit Center =

Bus transfer center in Orem, Utah, U.S.

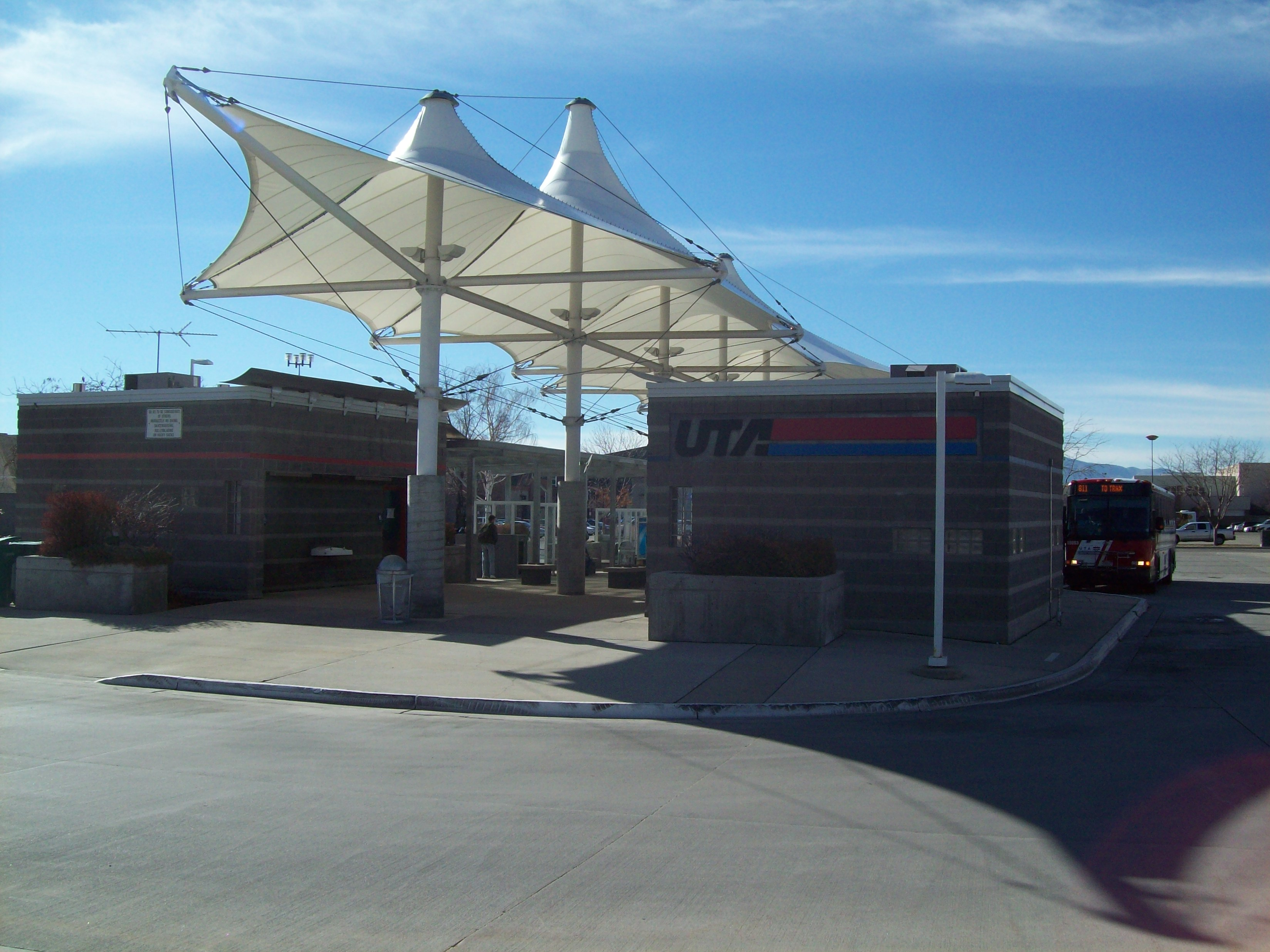
- The Mount Timpanogos Transit Center, east side

General information
- Other names: Timpanogos Transit Center (Note: Although the official name of the facility is "Mount Timpanogos Transit Center", the name is often shorted to just the Timpanogos Transit Center.)
- Location: 1145 South 750 East; Orem, Utah 84097-7222; United States
- Coordinates: 40.2762°N 111.6766°W
- Owner: Utah Transit Authority (UTA)
- Bus routes: 811, 830, 850, 862, & 880
- Bus stands: 6
- Bus operators: UTA Bus

Construction
- Parking: 5+ short term spaces
- Cycle facilities: Racks, but no lockers
- Accessible: Yes

Other information
- Status: Staffed

History
- Opened: 20 August 2000
Location

The Mount Timpanogos Transit Center was a staffed, open air bus transfer station in southeast Orem, Utah, United States. It functioned as both the Utah Transit Authority's (UTA) customer service center for Utah County, as well as a bus transfer center for UTA's buses in east central Utah Valley. Prior to the opening of the FrontRunner commuter rail extension south to Provo in 2012), it was the busiest bus stop within the entire UTA bus system.

== Description ==
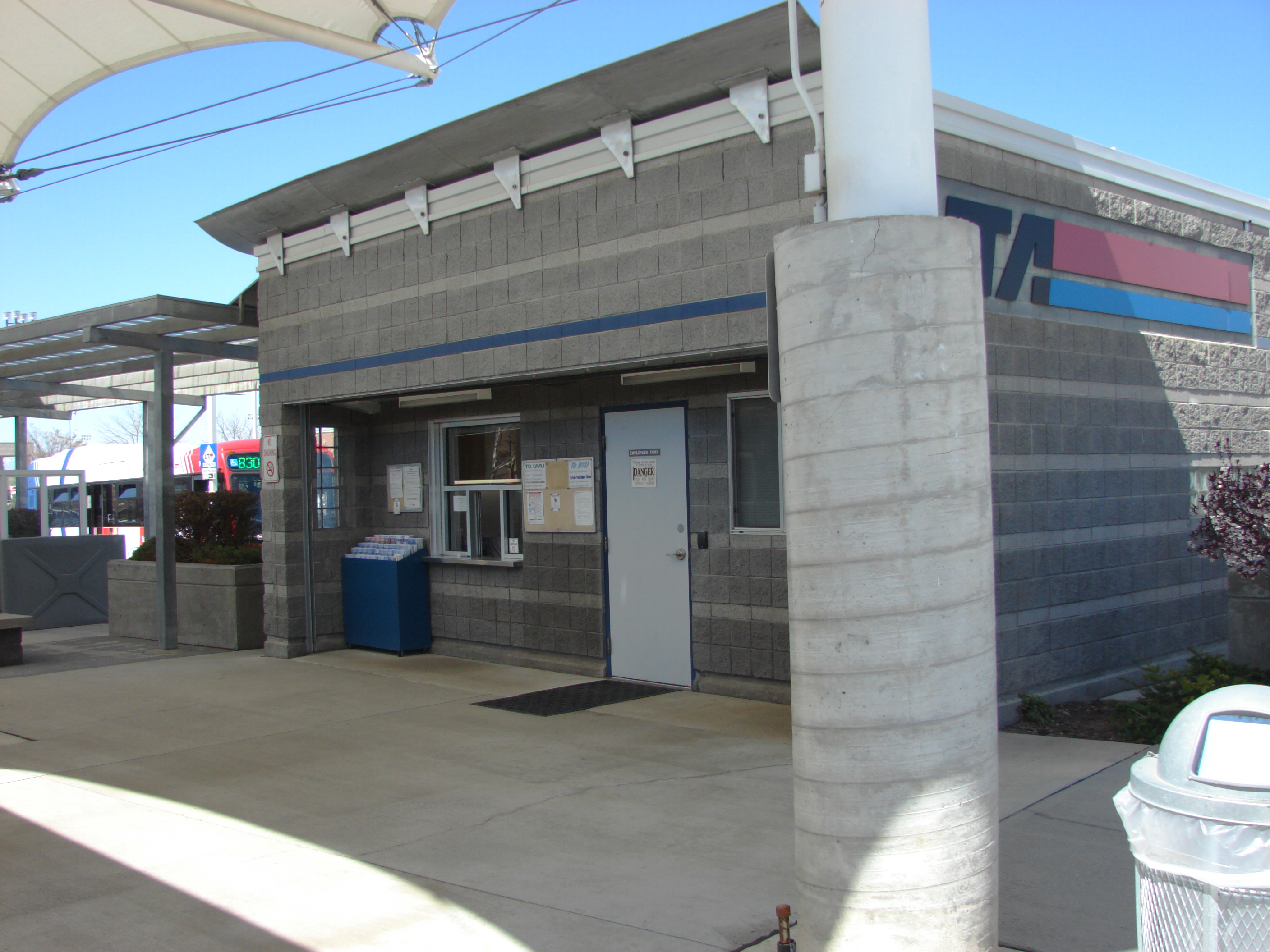
The customer service window at the Mount Timpanogos Transit Center

The Mount Timpanogos Transit Center was located at 1145 South 750 East, immediately east of the University Mall. (While it was also adjacent to South 800 East, there was no direct vehicle access from that road. Also, vehicle access to that section of South 750 East was only possible by way of East 1100 South, East 1200 South, or the mall parking lot.) The customer service telephone number is (801) 227-8923 and hours of operation are from 7:00 am to 6:00 pm Monday through Friday.

The transit center also served as the lost and found for UTA's Timpanogas Business Unit (essentially Utah County) and was considered a "corporate location" by UTA. It offered restrooms as well, but access to them had to be obtained by request at the customer service window. Several bicycle racks were provided, but (unlike most of UTA's rail stations) it had no bicycle lockers. There were five short term parking spaces available within the transit center, with substantial additional parking available across the street (to the west) in the mall parking lot. While the transit center was open air, its fabric awning provided limited shelter for passengers during inclement weather. The facility had a horseshoe shape with the one-way traffic lane, for buses only, beginning at South 750 East (at the northwest corner of the transit center), heading east, and then looping clockwise back to the same street (at the southwest corner of the facility). The transit center's six bus stands were located on either side of the interior of the horseshoe. The customer parking was situated in the middle of the horseshoe on the west end and the buildings were on the east end of the inside of the horseshoe.

All of UTA's TRAX and FrontRunner trains and stations, streetcars and streetcar stops, and all fixed route buses are compliant with the Americans with Disabilities Act (ADA) and are therefore accessible to those with disabilities. In accordance with the Utah Clean Air Act and UTA ordinance, "Tobacco is prohibited on UTA vehicles and bus stops as well as UTA owned property, except at designated locations...".

=== Timpanogos Maintenance Facility ===
About 2.8 miles (4.5 km) west of the transit center UTA has its Timpanogos Maintenance Facility. The facility, which is located at 1110 South Geneva Road (SR-114) in Orem and fairly near the Orem FrontRunner station, is responsible for all vehicle (except rail) maintenance within the UTA's Timpanogos Division. (The Timpanogos Division manages all UTA bus service within Utah County.) In 1990 the Timpanogos Bus Facility, as it was called at the time, replaced the Timpanogos Division's former building, which was located at 1111 West 100 South in Provo.

== History ==
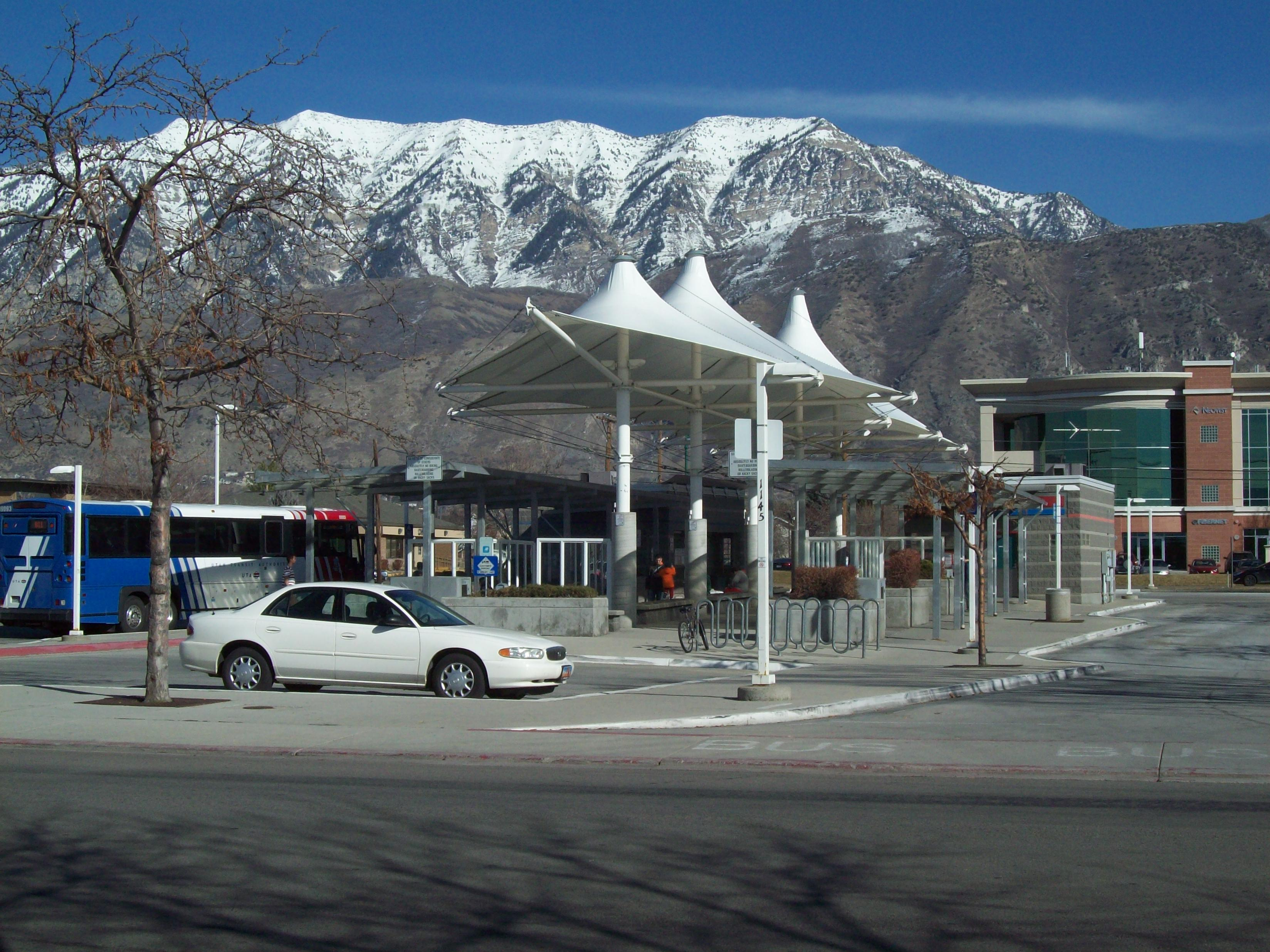
The Mount Timpanogos Transit Center, west side

In January 1985, the Timpanogos Division of UTA (which initially just served Provo and Orem) began operations. Just over four years later UTA opened a customer service center within the University Mall, just inside the northeast entrance. The new service center was initially only open for about five hours each "regular shopping" day. About a decade later, negotiations were underway between the City of Orem and UTA regarding a transit center. However, it took several more years before UTA finally completed the Mount Timpanogos Transit Center. The new transit center was built east of the mall (just across the parking lot and east of the former service center) and officially opened on 20 August 2000.

The Mount Timpanogos Transit Center was originally the primary transfer center for UTA buses in Utah County and, at one point, the busiest stop within all of UTA's system. However the transit center's role as a hub decreased significantly following the extension of the FrontRunner commuter rail south to Provo in 2012 and the increased number of routes connecting at Utah Valley University. For example, for many years prior to the southern extension of the FrontRunner, most of the bus routes that connected Utah County with Salt Lake County also included a stop at the transit center. Following the commuter rail extension, not even the sole remaining bus route (Route 811) that connected the two counties stopped at the Mount Timpanogos Transit Center. (Notwithstanding, several years later service by Route 811 was finally restored to the transit center before finally being discontinued in August 2018.) (Note: Having Route 811 no longer stop at the Mount Timpanogos Transit Center (upon the commencement of the FrontRunner commuter rail service in Utah County) was significant for two reasons. First, under the established fare system at the time, travel to between Utah and Salt Lake counties was the standard rate for bus travel, but was distance based (and more costly) for travel on the FrontRunner. Second, since the FrontRunner did not operate on Sundays and Route 811 was the only bus within Utah County that did operate on that day of the week, the lack of a connection to the transit center further compounded the difficulty of Sunday travel.)

== Future plans ==
One of the most important changes that affected the Mount Timpanogos Transit Center in the near future was the completion of the Utah Valley Express (UVX), a bus rapid transit line that connects the Orem and Provo FrontRunner stations by way of Utah Valley University and Brigham Young University, primarily along University Parkway (SR-265) and University Avenue (US-189). The UVX line began operations in August 2018. While the UVX line does not connect directly at the transit center, it does have a substantial impact on the bus traffic in the area. (Note: The nearest stop to the Mount Timpanogos Transit Center for UVX bus rapid transit line is located about 1,275 feet (389 m) southeast of the transit center with its island platform situated in the median of East University Avenue, just east of the intersection with University Place (about 700 East).)

Another change that affected the transit center was the construction of University Place, a mixed use development that essentially surrounds the University Mall. While this construction did not require additional land, (Note: University Place was built within the University Mall's existing 112-acre (45 ha) site. While much of the development was constructed in mall parking areas, the additional space necessary was made possible by a combination of improvements made on previously undeveloped land on the periphery of the mall site (mostly on the northeast corner) and by the construction of underground parking garages.) nor did it result in an increase in the overall square feet utilized for retail, it was anticipated to eventually include 1,100 housing units, a hotel, and 600,000 square feet (56,000 m^{2}) of office space, as well as a civic park. The transit center was anticipated to remain at its existing location on the eastern edge of this real estate expansion and was the primary regular bus stop for the development.

In addition to the Utah Valley Express line, UTA also plans to eventually augment its service with additional BRT lines within about 5–16 years. One of these additional lines will connect the Provo and American Fork FrontRunner stations and will follow a route that runs primarily along State Street (US-89) through Provo, Orem, Lindon, Pleasant Grove, and American Fork. While this MAX line will not connect at the transit center either, it will pass along South State Street (about 2,600 feet [790 m] to the west) and will further affect the bus traffic in the area.

In the fall of 2019, the lost and found/ customer service center was moved to the bus garage on Geneva Rd. With the bus bays now sitting empty, the only two bus routes serving the station are the 850 running from Lehi Station to Provo Central, and 862 from Orem Central to UVU, going around Orem city limits and ending at the University Place UVX stop. The physical facilities were demolished rather abruptly in January 2020 in preparation for a new Courtyard Inn by Marriott planned to open on the site. Adjacent bus routes continue to use the stop in front of the former site.

== Bus connections ==
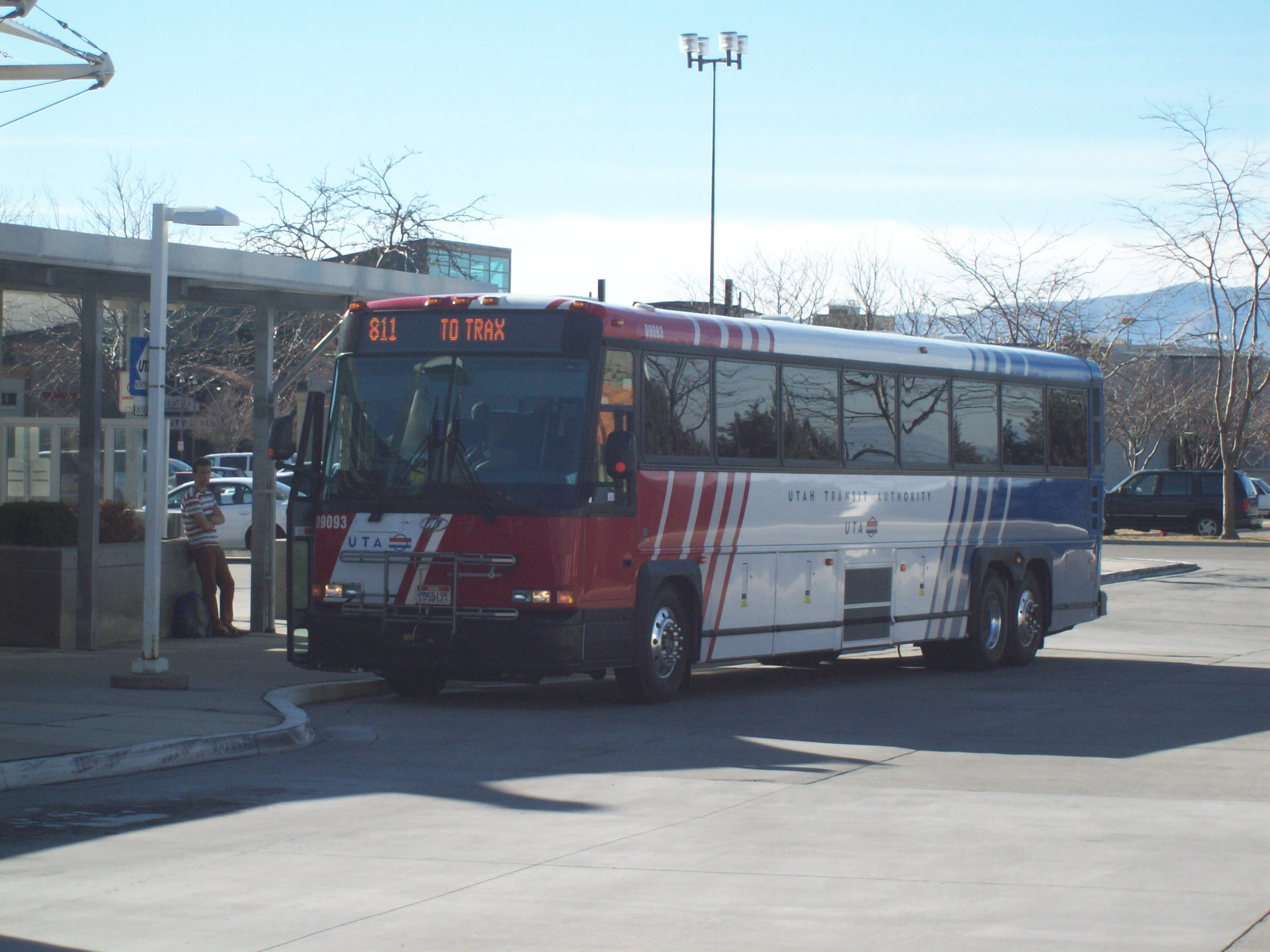
A UTA bus (Route 811 - Utah Valley TRAX Connector) stopped at the Mount Timpanogos Transit Center

The following UTA bus routes connected at the Mount Timpanogos Transit Center: (Note: Bus routes are current as of Change Day, 6 December 2015)

- UTA Route 811 - Utah Valley TRAX Connector (Draper, only at Draper Peaks shopping center and Kimballs Lane (TRAX) station - Lehi, only at the Lehi station - American Fork, including The Meadows and the Alpine Valley shopping centers, but not the American Fork station - Orem, including Utah Valley University, & University Mall. but not the Orem station - Provo [weekdays only], including Plum Tree Shopping Center, Provo Utah Temple, Missionary Training Center, and Brigham Young University, but not the Provo [via I-15 & University Parkway])
  Route 811 is the only UTA bus route that connects betweenSalt Lake and Utah counties
- UTA Route 830 - Provo/Orem FrontRunner Connector (Orem, including Orem station, Utah Valley University, & University Mall - Provo, including Brigham Young University. Provo City Center Temple & Provo station [via University Avenue and University Parkway])
- UTA Route 850 - State Street (Lehi, including Lehi station - American Fork, including Meadows Shopping Center, but not America Fork station - Pleasant Grove - Lindon - Orem, including University Mall, but nor Orem station - Provo, including Utah Valley Regional Medical Center and Provo station [via State Street])
- UTA Route 862 - Orem East/West (Utah Valley University - Canyon Park Technology Center [via 1200 West, 1600 North, and 800 East])
- UTA Route 880 - Sundance Ski Service (Provo station - Harmon's Park and Ride Lot - Sundance Resort [these stops only, in addition to the transit center])
  Seasonal bus, ski season only
