= Utah Valley Express =

Bus rapid transit line in Utah County, Utah, United States

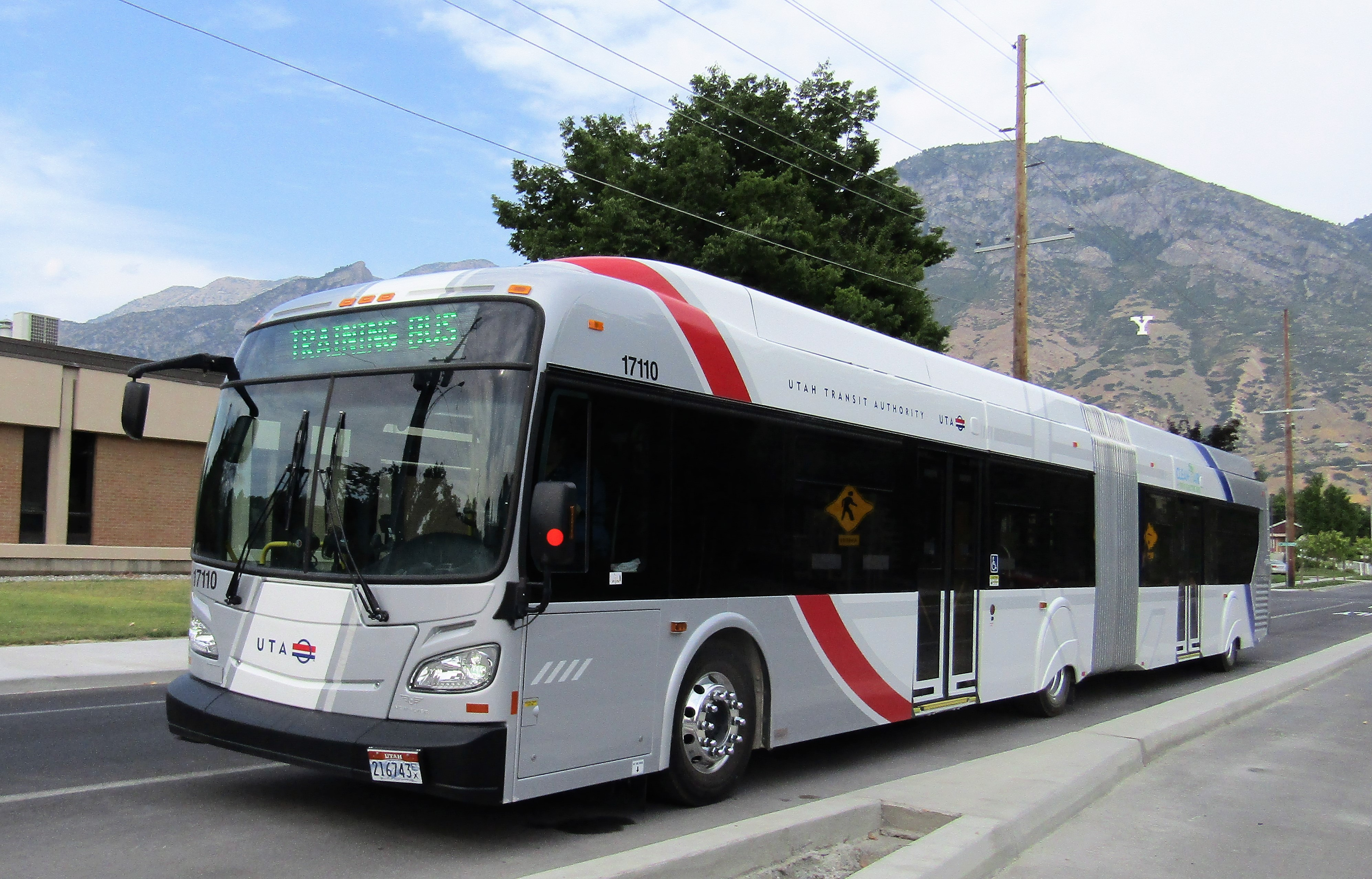
- UVX bus operating on North 700 East

Overview
- Other name: Provo Orem MAX
- Owner: Utah Transit Authority (UTA)
- Locale: Provo and Orem, Utah
- Termini: Orem Central station; East Bay Business Park
- Stations: 19

Service
- Type: Bus rapid transit (BRT)
- System: Utah Transit Authority bus rapid transit
- Route number: 830X
- Depot: Mount Timpanogos
- Rolling stock: New Flyer XDE60
- Ridership: 10,000

History
- Opened: August 13, 2018; 8 years ago

Technical
- Line length: 11.0 mi (17.7 km)
- Operating speed: 50 mph (80 km/h) (max)

Utah Valley Express, also known as UVX, is a bus rapid transit (BRT) line in central Utah County, Utah, United States. The line is operated by the Utah Transit Authority (UTA) and runs between southwest Orem to south central Provo by way of Utah Valley University (UVU) and Brigham Young University (BYU). It began service with a soft opening on August 13, 2018, while the station platforms were being finished and was formally opened on January 9, 2019. It is the second of several BRT lines that UTA has or is planning in Utah County and the Salt Lake Valley.

== Description ==
The Utah Valley Express line connects the Orem FrontRunner station with UVU, the University Mall, BYU, downtown Provo, the Provo FrontRunner station, the Provo Towne Centre mall, the East Bay Business Park and follows a route primarily along University Parkway (SR-265) and University Avenue (US-189). The line includes 17 stops (stations) and runs at 10-15 minute intervals, with 6 minute headways during peak hours and no service on Sundays. Since August 2020, service south of Provo FrontRunner station has run as a separate service.

UTA had anticipated having the Utah Valley Express operational by the time the Provo and Orem FrontRunner stations opened in the fall of 2012, but by early July 2016 construction on the line had yet to commence. The Federal Transit Administration reported that construction would begin in mid 2016 and that service would begin in 2019. The initial cost of the Utah Valley Express was estimated to be nearly $160 million.

The Utah Valley Express connects with the FrontRunner at both the Provo and Orem intermodal centers (stations). The FrontRunner is a commuter rail service run by UTA that operates along the Wasatch Front with service from Provo, through Salt Lake County (including Salt Lake City), Davis County, Weber County, and Ogden. The FrontRunner also connects with UTA's TRAX light rail system in the Salt Lake Valley as well as Amtrak's (the National Railroad Passenger Corporation) California Zephyr (Note: While the FrontRunner connects with the Amtrak station in Salt Lake City, the California Zephyr also stops in Provo. The Provo Amtrak station is located about a block west of the Provo Intermodal Center, but has limited services (no ticketing, no baggage check, no indoor waiting room, etc.).) (which runs daily between Chicago, Illinois, and the San Francisco Bay Area) and Greyhound inter-city buses.

== History ==
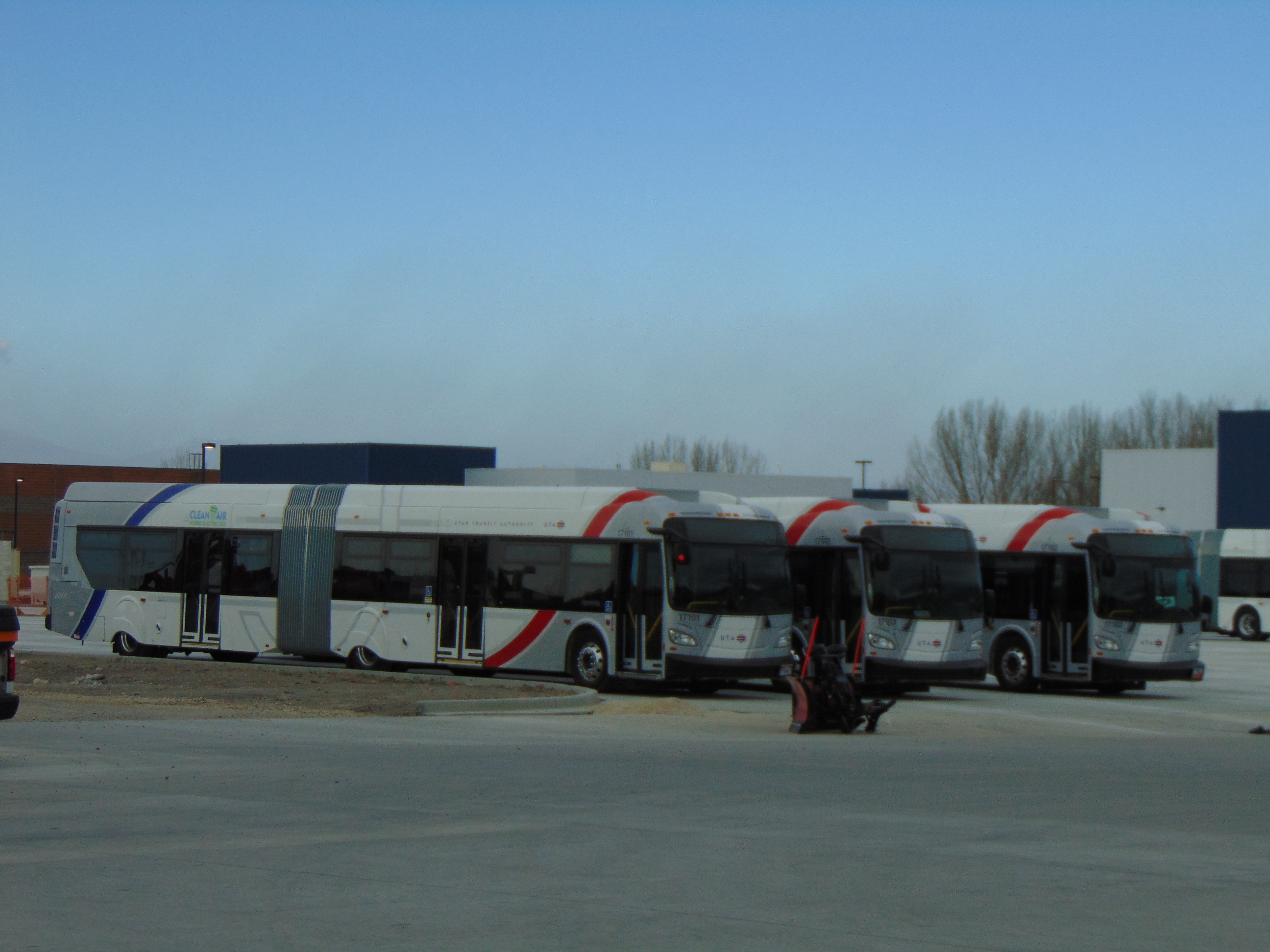
First three of the new New Flyer XDE60 buses for the Utah Valley Express at the Timpanogos Maintenance Facility, December 2017

As the initial route was nearing finalization in early 2013, Brigham Young University announced that it was closing a portion of East Campus Drive. Even though none of the (then current) Utah Valley Express route ran along this road (although it had been previously anticipated), the closure of this five lane road would affect traffic on nearby streets, primarily 900 East. Since the traffic projections were based upon the use of East Campus Drive, it became prudent to re-assess the portion of the route in the area of 900 East to ensure that the previously preferred route was still the best option. As part of this discussion many alternatives arose, but the original route kept, with a few modifications. One of the major considerations for keeping the original route was the strong possibility of losing federal funding, as well as substantial financial support from the Mountainland Association of Governments.

Other changes that were made later in the process included the stop that was initially planned to be located at about 1100 North 900 East. It was first moved slightly north to just north of Birch Lane/Heritage Drive in front of the BYU Creamery. However, this stop was later eliminated altogether in favor of two new stops, one on the southeast edge of BYU campus (on 900 North) and one on the northeast edge of campus (on University Parkway), at the south entrance to the Missionary Training Center. Additional improvement recommendations were also added along 900 East, including 10 feet (3.0 m) sidewalks.

In March 2015 the Federal Transit Administration approved the Environmental Assessment submitted by UTA in late 2014 with a "Finding of No Significant Impact."

In April 2016, Provo City and Orem City voted to approve a 50-year lease agreement allowing UTA to construct dedicated lanes and other improvements on local roads owned by Provo and Orem (mainly on 700 North in Provo and near UVU in Orem). However, this decision received significant opposition from some residents.

Service began with a soft opening on August 13, 2018, while the station platforms were being finished and was formally opened on January 9, 2019, with several dignitaries in attendance including BYU President Kevin J. Worthen, Provo mayor Michelle Kaufusi, UVU President Astrid S. Tuminez, Orem mayor Richard Brunst, and mascots Cosmo the Cougar and Willy the Wolverine.

Through 2023, there was no fee to ride on the UVX thanks to a federal grant from the U.S. Department of Transportation. This was later extended another year, with fares being implemented starting on August 18, 2024.

=== Name ===
While the line was being designed and under construction, it was known as the Provo-Orem Bus Rapid Transit or the Provo-Orem MAX. The project was sometimes referred to as the Provo-Orem Transportation Improvement Project (Provo-Orem TRIP), although the BRT line was only a part of the overall Provo-Orem TRIP project to improve transportation in the area.

In the fall of 2017 UTA asked the public for name suggestions for the new line, the Provo-Orem TRIP Executive Committee then selected their top choices from the suggestions. Following a trademark review of the committee's choices, the public was presented, for a vote, with three names: TimpRunner, TimpExpress, or Utah Valley Express. Following the vote, in which 524 persons out of approximately 950 votes selected Utah Valley Express, the UTA Board of Trustees approved the Utah Valley Express name during their March 28, 2018, meeting.

== Future ==
As the need increases and funding becomes available, Phase II improvements will be implemented. In Phase II, the northwest end of the Utah Valley Express will be rerouted directly east from the Orem station along West 800 South (instead of south along Geneva Road) and connect with the UVU campus by way of a new high-occupancy/toll (HOT) interchange overpass. It will then pass by the north and east edges of the UVU campus before reaching University Parkway and continuing along the remainder of its original route. As part of the reroute, the single BRT stop on the south side of the UVU campus (UCU/Sandhill) will be replaced by three new stops along the north and east sides of campus. The cost of Phase II is anticipated to be about $18 million.

In addition to the Phase II improvements to the line, UTA also plans to eventually augment the Utah Valley Express with additional (BRT) lines within about 7–16 years. One of the lines will run north from the Provo station following along 500 West (US-89) in Provo; State Street (US-89) through Provo, Orem, Lindon, Pleasant Grove; and Main Street (US-89) through American Fork until it reaches the American Fork FrontRunner station. Another BRT line will run south from the Provo station though East Bay Business Park, then east along 1860 South to State Street (US-89), then south through Springville on Main Street (US-89), then southwest along South State Road (SR-51) to Spanish Fork, finally through Spanish Fork (on Expressway Lane, 800 North, Main Street, Center Street) until it reaches the planned FrontRunner station in Spanish Fork (west of I-15 and south of Center Street).

== Route ==
Unofficial Provo Orem BRT route map. Stop names/locations are subject to change.

The Utah Valley Express is designated as UTA Route 830X. (The following route is description of the "locally preferred route" (LPR) and is still subject to minor changes before finalization.)

=== South Orem ===
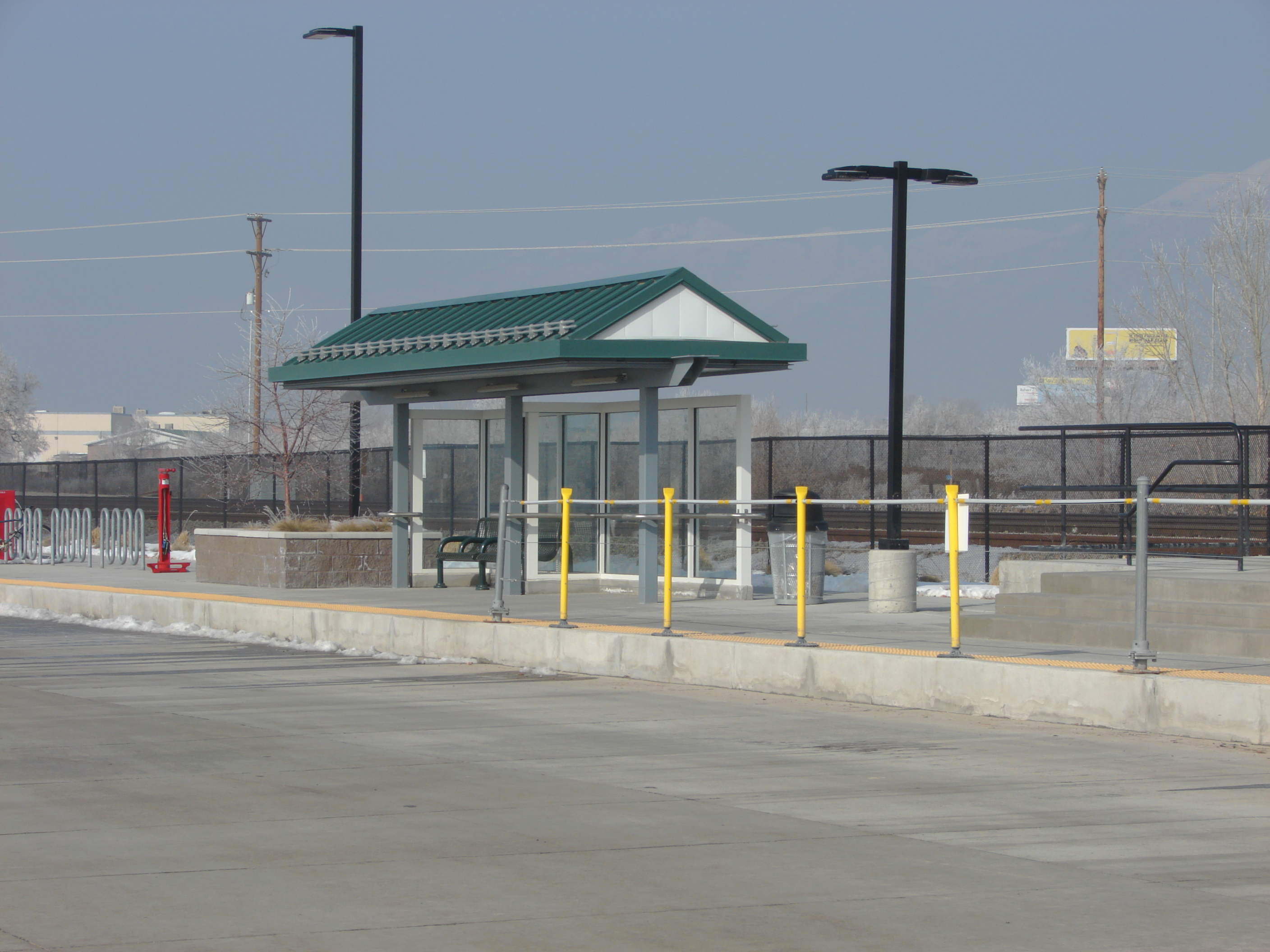
The Utah Valley Express passenger platform and northern shelter at Orem station, February 2016

The Utah Valley Express begins at the Orem Intermodal Center (FrontRunner station), which is located at 900 South 1350 West. After heading west to and then briefly south on Geneva Road (SR-114), it heads east on University Parkway (SR-265) to cross over I-15 and then turn north on Sandhill Road. At the end of this very short stretch of Sandhill Road it turns east (through the roundabout) and then heads east on College Drive (on the southern edge of the UVU campus) until it reaches the UVU stop on College Drive and/or West 1200 South. From that stop it continues east on West 1200 South until it reaches another roundabout at 400 West. Immediately after turning south on South 400 West and then east again on University Parkway it reaches the Lakeview stop (located in the median of West University Parkway, just east of South 400 West).

From the 400 West stop the Utah Valley Express continues east in dedicated inside lanes and ascends the Provo Bench and crosses South 200 West and South Main Street. Immediately after crossing South Main Street it arrives at the Main Street stop (located in the median of East University Parkway, just east of South Main Street). After that stop it continues east in its dedicated inside lanes, crossing South 200 East and State Street (US-89) before passing by the south side of University Place and reaching the last stop in Orem (University Place) at about 700 East. The platforms for this stop are also located in the median of East University Parkway. Shortly after that stop, it crosses South 800 East and then heads southeast on East University Parkway to descend the Provo Bench as it leaves Orem and enters Provo.

=== North Provo ===
Continuing southeast on North University Parkway in its dedicated inside lanes the Utah Valley Express reaches the 2230 North stop just after crossing 2230 North/550 West in Provo. The platform for this stop is again located in the median of North University Parkway. From that stop it continues southeast on North University Parkway in its dedicated lanes until it passes over the Provo River and then crosses North 200 West (Freedom Boulevard) and North University Avenue (US-189).

Immediately after crossing North University Avenue, the Utah Valley Express continues east on East University Parkway in shared lanes and crosses North Canyon Road (North 150 East) before passing by the northern edge of the BYU campus and the southern side of the LaVell Edwards Stadium. Just east of the stadium it arrives at the BYU Stadium stop at about 350 East. The platforms for this stop are located on the sides of East University Parkway, directly north of the Larry H. Miller baseball and softball fields and immediately east of the signalized intersection with the events parking lot access. (Note: Construction of an additional island platform has been considered for the BYU Stadium stop (in median of East University Parkway, between the other two platforms). Use of this platform would be limited to game day service and would allow for additional buses to load and unload from the inside lanes of East University Parkway in both directions.) Since there are no dedicated lanes along this portion of the route, bus turnouts are included for this stop. From this stop it continues east on East University Parkway. At about 850 East it reaches the next (yet unnamed) stop. This stop has two platforms on both sides of East University Parkway. A new crosswalk with a traffic light was constructed that continues straight north across East University Parkway from the existing sidewalk (pedestrian path) that runs along the east side of the Harmon Building. The stops are just west of the crosswalk and the current parking lot access. Since there are still no dedicated lanes along this portion of the route, bus turnouts were also included for the BYU North Campus stop.

After that stop the Utah Valley Express continues in shared traffic lanes to turn south onto North 900 East and pass by the eastern edge of BYU campus. Shortly after crossing Birch Lane/Heritage Drive, it turns west onto East 900 North and quickly reaches the (BYU South Campus) stop on the southeast corner of BYU campus. This will stop is the primary stop for BYU campus and has two platforms (one on each side of East 900 North), rather than a single platform in the median and are located west of East Campus Drive. From that stop it turns south on North 700 East. (Note: While minor modifications to most of the intersections along the Utah Valley Express route have occurred, the intersection of North 700 East and East 900 North is the only one that required a major realignment during Phase I. Previously, the north end of North 700 East terminated at East 900 North in a T-intersection. Traffic turning left from North 700 East onto East 900 North (BYU campus) was required to stop, while traffic turning east was only required to yield. Crews modified the current alignment such that East 900 North now curves south through the intersection to become North 700 East. The portion of East 900 North west of North 700 East now curves slightly to the south to form a three-way intersection (roughly a T) at the midpoint of the curve of the other two roads. However, westbound traffic on East 900 North now has a lane that continues straight through, bypassing the actual intersection. The result is that the only traffic required to stop is eastbound from East 900 North and the only traffic required to yield is turning left onto East 900 North from North 700 East.) There are dedicated outside lanes on East 900 North between East Campus Drive and North 900 East, except for the easternmost portion for the northbound buses (heading east at this point) which cross from the outside lane to make a left-hand turn onto North 900 East. Also, regular traffic between East Campus Drive and North 900 East is reduced from two lanes to one lane in each direction.

After briefly continuing south on North 700 East in shared lanes the Utah Valley Express turns west again onto East 700 North. Continuing on, in dedicated lanes once again, it heads east until it crosses North 600 East and North 500 East, passes by far southern edge of BYU campus, reaches the Joaquin stop (located in the median of East 700 North just east of North 400 East). From that stop it continues west again, still in its dedicated inside lanes, and crosses North 400 East, North 300 East, North 200 East, North 100 East, before finally arriving at North University Avenue.

Upon reaching North University Avenue again, the Utah Valley Express turns south on that road and continues on, still in its dedicated inside lanes, to cross 600 North and arrive at the Academy Square stop (located in the median of University Avenue, at about 600 North northwest of the Provo City Library). From that stop it continues south in its dedicated inside lanes and crosses 500 North, 400 North, 300 North and then arrives at the 300 North stop (located in the median of University Avenue, just south of 300 North). After that stop it enters the main downtown Provo business district and continues south in its dedicated inside lanes and crosses 200 North, 100 North, Center Street.

=== South Provo ===
After crossing Center Street the Utah Valley Express immediately arrives at the Center Street stop (located in the median of University Avenue just south of Center Street in front of the Provo City Center Temple). From that stop it continues south, still in its dedicated inside lanes, crossing 200 South and 300 South (US-89) before reaching the 400 South stop (located in the median of University Avenue, just north of 400 South). After crossing 400 South it continues in shared lanes (beyond the 400 South stop there are no more dedicated lanes for the Utah Valley Express) as it crosses over the 600 South and the Union Pacific and FrontRunner tracks on the South University Avenue Viaduct. Immediately after the viaduct it crosses 780 South and then reaches 920 South and turn west. After briefly heading west on West 920 South, it turns north onto South 100 East. After crossing West 700 South it reaches Provo Central Station (FrontRunner station).

After its stop at the Provo Intermodal Center, the Utah Valley Express heads briefly west on West 700 South until it once again reaches Freedom Boulevard (South 200 West). After turning south on South 200 West it continues in shared lanes as it passes through the West 920 South roundabout, crosses West 1020 South and reaches Towne Centre Boulevard. At Towne Centre Boulevard it turns east and continues very briefly until the road turns south. Continuing south, still in shared lanes, it reaches the Towne Centre Blvd stop as it passes by the east side of the mall closest to the JC Penney. It then continues south on Town Centre Boulevard (at about 100 West) until it reaches Towne Centre Drive (at about 1450 South) and turns east on that road. Continuing east in shared lanes Towne Centre Drive becomes East Bay Boulevard after it crosses South University Avenue.

Continuing east in a shared lane on East East Bay Boulevard it crosses South 40 East before reaching the East Bay North stop (located just east of South 180 East on the eastbound lanes). It then crosses South 180 East before turning south as East Bay Boulevard curves and becomes East Bay Boulevard. Upon reaching East 1860 South it turns west and, while still in a shared lane, it arrives at the East Bay South stop (located on the west bound lanes). From that stop it continues west until it once again reaches South University Avenue. After turning north on South University Avenue, it continues north until it turns west on Towne Centre Drive.

The Utah Valley Express stops only once at both the East Bay North and South stops (in one direction only) as it loops clockwise through the East Bay Business Park. After turning west onto Towne Centre Drive, it follows its route back to the Orem Intermodal Center as it stops at all the other stops/stations alone its route. Occasionally, buses will head north through the Freedom Boulevard roundabout and turn into Provo Central Station at 750 South.

== Stops ==
Stops are listed from north to south.

Utah Valley Express (Orem - Provo)
Stop	City	Southbound station	Northbound station	UTA bus connections (Note: Bus connection routes are current as of Change Day, November 23, 2025)	Date opened	Park & Ride lot	Notes & other connections
Orem Central	Orem	900 S 1350 West		831, 862	August 13, 2018	Yes	FrontRunner; Salt Lake Express
UVU	Orem	701 W 1200 South	701 W 1200 South	805, 806, 807, 822, 831, 862	August 13, 2018	No	Serves UVU
Lakeview	Orem	390 W University Pkwy		831*	December 4, 2018**	No	Serves UVU and southwest Orem (400 West)
Main Street	Orem	10 E University Pkwy		831*	December 4, 2018**	No	Serves south central Orem (Main Street)
University Place	Orem	570 E University Pkwy		850*, 862*, 880*	December 4, 2018**	No	Serves University Mall and southeast Orem
2230 North	Provo	2220 N University Pkwy		822*, 834*	December 4, 2018**	No	Serves northwest Provo
BYU Stadium	Provo	372 E University Pkwy	372 E University Pkwy	None	August 13, 2018	No	Serves BYU, including LaVell Edwards Stadium and Marriott Center
BYU North Campus	Provo	716 E University Pkwy	716 E University Pkwy	None	August 13, 2018	No	Serves BYU (north campus), the MTC, and the Provo Utah Rock Canyon Temple
BYU Central Campus	Provo	1051 N 900 East	1112 N 900 East	None	November 24, 2025	No	Serves BYU (main campus)
BYU South Campus	Provo	735 E 900 North	735 E 900 North	822*, 831*	August 13, 2018	No	Serves BYU (south campus)
Joaquin	Provo	424 E 700 North		831*	August 13, 2018	No	Serves off-campus student housing (south of BYU)
Academy Square	Provo	592 N University Ave		None	December 4, 2018**	No	Serves Provo (including the Provo City Library)
300 North	Provo	298 N University Ave		None	December 4, 2018**	No	Serves downtown Provo
Center Street	Provo	12 S University Ave		850*	December 4, 2018**	No	Serves downtown Provo and the Provo City Center Temple
400 South	Provo	392 S University Ave		823*, 831*, 850*	December 4, 2018**	No	Serves downtown Provo; temporarily closed 2025 through 2027 for University Ave viaduct construction
Provo Central	Provo	701 S Freedom Blvd		805, 821, 823, 831, 833, 834, 850	August 13, 2018	Yes	FrontRunner; Salt Lake Express; Amtrak: California Zephyr (at Provo)
Towne Centre Blvd	Provo	1272 Towne Centre Blvd		821*, 850*	August 13, 2018	No	Serves Provo Towne Centre
East Bay North (Note: The Utah Valley Express does a clockwise loop through the East Bay Business Park. As result it only stops once on the north side of the business park and once on the south side of the business park (near Novell) before returning to the Provo Towne Centre (without stopping on the north side of the business park again).)	Provo	172 E East Bay Blvd		821*	August 13, 2018	No	Serves East Bay Business Park
East Bay South	Provo	202 E Lakeview Pkwy		None	August 13, 2018	No	Serves East Bay Business Park
*Indicates bus connections which do not connect directly at station/stop, but are easily accessible nearby (as indicated); **Temporary street side stops were utilized prior to the station actually opening for service

== Future Stops ==
As part of Phase II three new stops will be created on the north and northeast side of the UVU campus and the stop on the south side of campus (UVU) will be eliminated.

Utah Valley Express (Orem - Provo)
Stop name	City	Southbound station	Northbound station	UTA bus connections (Note: Bus connection routes are current as of Change Day, April 13, 2025)	Park & Ride lot	Notes & other connections
800 South	Orem			807, 831, 862	No	
UVU North	Orem			807, 831, 862	No	
UVU South	Orem			807, 831, 862	No	

== See also ==
- Utah Transit Authority bus rapid transit
- FrontRunner
