= Utah State Route 176 =

State highway in Utah, United States

State Route 176
- Vineyard Connector Road

Route information
- Maintained by UDOT
- Length: 1.042 mi (1.677 km)
- Existed: 2017–present

Major junctions
- South end: SR-52 / SR-114 in Orem
- North end: Main Street in Vineyard

Location
- Country: United States
- State: Utah
- Counties: Utah

Highway system
- Utah State Highway System; Interstate; US; State; Minor; Scenic
← SR-175	→ SR-177

State Route 176 (SR-176) is the designation given to the partially completed roadway named Vineyard Connector Road.

== Route description ==
SR-176 begins at SR-114 on the eastern side of Vineyard and heads west. The road crosses the FrontRunner and Union Pacific Railroad tracks via an overpass before terminating at Main Street.

== History ==
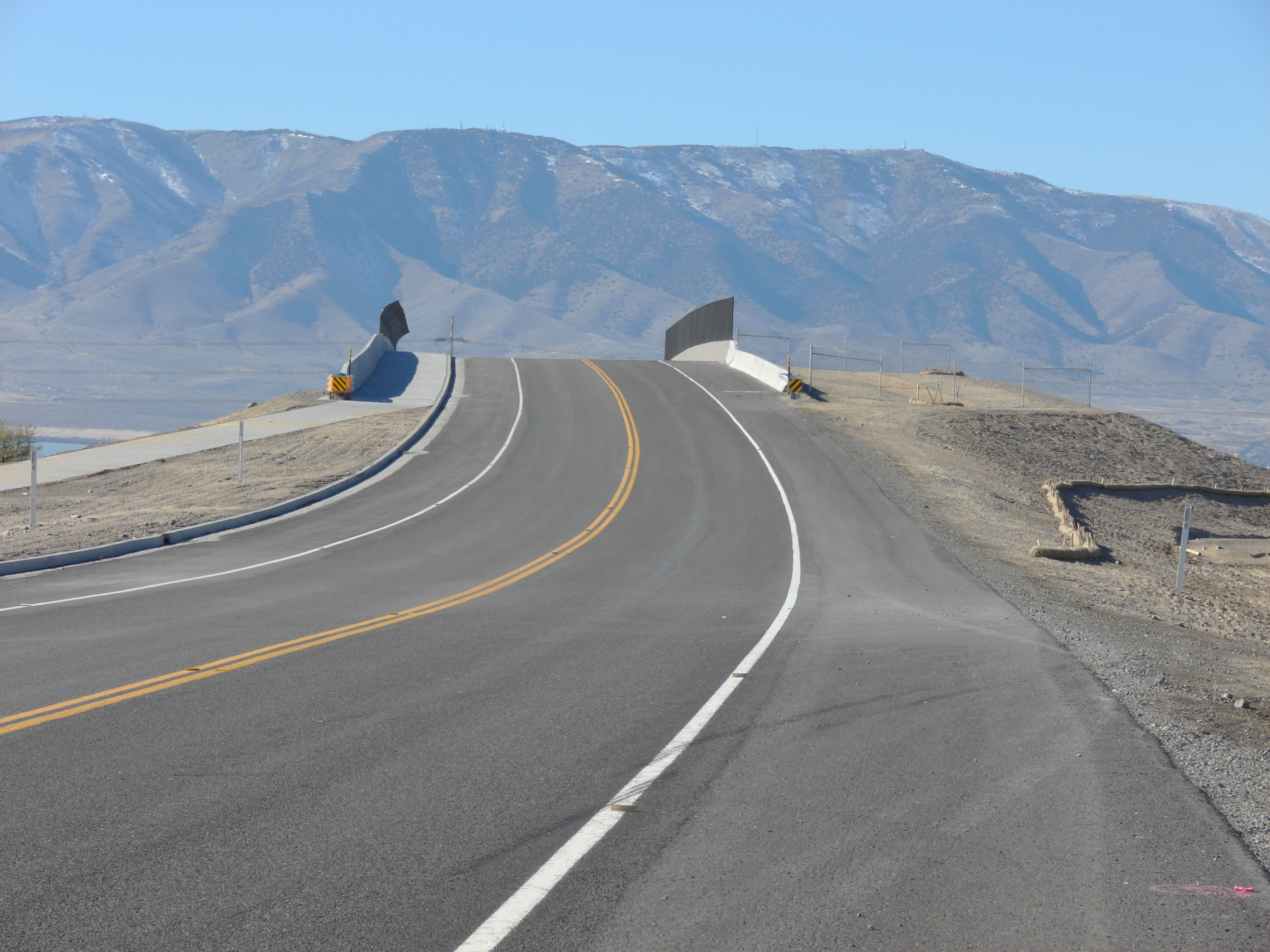

The completed highway will be located mostly, if not entirely, within the Town of Vineyard. The completed portion has been signed in both directions (as "north" and "south"). It was officially designated State Route 176 during the 2017 session of the Utah State Legislature.

== Major intersections ==
The entire route is in Utah County.

Location	mi	km	Destinations	Notes
Orem–Vineyard line	0.000	0.000	SR-114 (Geneva Road) / SR-52 (800 North)	Southern terminus
Vineyard	1.021	1.643	Main Street	
Vineyard	1.042	1.677	End of pavement	Northern terminus
1.000 mi = 1.609 km; 1.000 km = 0.621 mi
