= Timpanogos Regional Hospital =

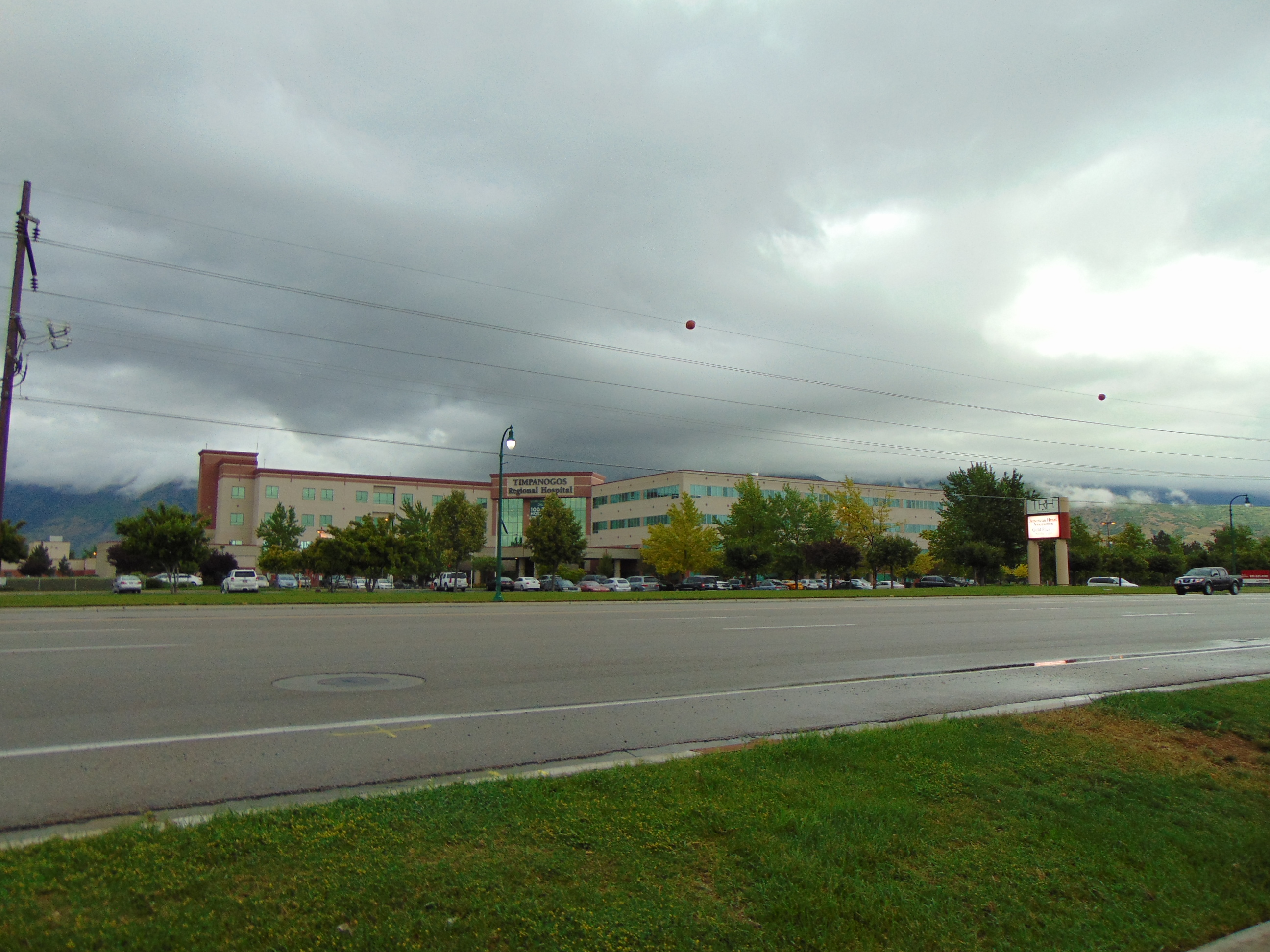
- North across West 500 North (Utah State Route 52) at Timpanogos Regional Hospital, June 2016

Geography
- Location: Orem, Utah, United States
- Coordinates: 40°18′50″N 111°42′50″W

Services
- Emergency department: Level III trauma center
- Beds: 122

Links
- Website: www.timpanogosregionalhospital.com
- Lists: Hospitals in the United States

Timpanogos Regional Hospital is a full-service 122-bed hospital located in Orem, Utah, United States. It is part of the MountainStar Healthcare system, which is a division of HCA Healthcare. Columbia Hospital Corporation (which later merged with HCA) opened the hospital in 1998. It is certified by the Centers for Medicare & Medicaid Services (CMS) and is recognized as Utah County's only Top 100 performing hospital, serving over 30,000 patients per year with a staff of over 900 physicians, medical personnel, and volunteers.

== History ==
Timpanogos Regional Hospital was founded in 1998, originally opening as a 45-bed hospital with limited services before expanding to its current 122-bed capacity.

On September 10, 2025, American right-wing political activist Charlie Kirk was pronounced dead at Timpanogos Regional Hospital at 2:40 PM, after being shot in the neck at Utah Valley University.

== Services ==
Timpanogos Regional Hospital provides emergency and trauma care, specialty surgical care, cancer services, and adult, pediatric, and neonatal intensive care. The hospital operates Utah County's only Pediatric Intensive Care Unit (PICU) and a Level III Neonatal Intensive Care Unit (NICU). Additional services include a cardiac catheterization lab, open heart surgery, neurosurgery, orthopedic and robot-assisted surgery, stroke designation, acute renal dialysis, labor and delivery, and a full-service dedicated emergency department with board-certified physicians available 24/7.
