= Utah State Route 241 =

State highway in Utah, United States

State Route 241
- 1600 North

Route information
- Maintained by UDOT
- Length: 1.555 mi (2.503 km)
- Existed: 1969–present

Major junctions
- West end: SR-114 in Lindon
- I-15 in Lindon
- East end: US 89 in Orem

Location
- Country: United States
- State: Utah
- Counties: Utah

Highway system
- Utah State Highway System; Interstate; US; State; Minor; Scenic
← SR-240	→ SR-243

State Route 241 is a state highway completely within Utah County in northern Utah, in the cities of Orem and Lindon. The route connects SR-114 (Geneva Road) to US-89 (State Street) via an interchange at I-15.

== Route description ==
The route begins at an intersection with SR-114 (Geneva Road) on the boundary of Orem and Lindon and heads due east on 1600 North. After coming to a diamond interchange with I-15 after only 0.2 miles (0.32 km), the route continues for approximately 1.15 miles (1.85 km) to its eastern terminus at US-89 (State Street). Much of the route is located on the Lindon-Orem municipal boundary; as such, though it is primarily referred to as 1600 North, it is also 600 South in the Lindon grid system.

== History ==
Before Interstate 15 was built, truck traffic bound for the Geneva Steel mill used SR-114 to access the mill. However, with the construction of the interstate, heavy truck traffic associated with the steel mill began to use 1600 North to connect to the I-15 interchange. The city of Orem, who maintained the road at the time, felt that this truck traffic was of statewide significance, and as such requested that this portion of 1600 North be added to the state highway system. However, at the time, the Utah Department of Transportation would not accept the road due to its poor condition. After Orem had reconstructed the roadway, it was added to the state highway system in 1969 as SR-241.

The route remained unchanged until 2019. By that time, the city of Orem did not have adequate funding to make necessary improvements to the 1600 North corridor between I-15 and US-89, so the cities requested that UDOT take over this segment of roadway. The Utah Transportation Commission approved the extension of SR-241 on November 15, 2019, after Orem, Lindon, and UDOT had signed a cooperative agreement detailing the terms of the jurisdictional transfer.

== Major intersections ==
The entire route is in Utah County.

Location	mi	km	Destinations	Notes
Orem–Lindon line	0.000	0.000	SR-114 (Geneva Road)	Western terminus
Orem–Lindon line	0.197– 0.417	0.317– 0.671	I-15 – Provo, Salt Lake City	Former eastern terminus
Orem	1.555	2.503	US 89 (State Street)	Eastern terminus
1.000 mi = 1.609 km; 1.000 km = 0.621 mi
