= Utah State Route 52 =

State highway in Utah, United States

State Route 52

Route information
- Maintained by UDOT
- Length: 4.122 mi (6.634 km)
- Existed: 1931–present

Major junctions
- West end: SR-114 / SR-176 in Orem
- I-15 in Orem; US 89 in Orem
- East end: US 189 in Orem

Location
- Country: United States
- State: Utah

Highway system
- Utah State Highway System; Interstate; US; State; Minor; Scenic
| ← SR-51 | → SR-53 |

State Route 52 (SR-52) is a state highway in the U.S. state of Utah, connecting I-15 with US-189 along Orem's 800 North.

The road became a state highway in 1923, and was numbered as a spur of SR-7 in 1927 before being assigned its own number (52). The west end was at US-89 until 1959, when it was extended to I-15; a further extension took it to SR-114 in 1964.

== Route description ==
SR-52 begins at the intersection of Geneva Road (SR-114) and 800 North in western Orem, across from the former Geneva Steel Plant, which was on the shore of Utah Lake. 800 North continues west of Geneva Road as SR-176, while SR-52 heads east, passing through a single-point urban interchange at I-15. For its entire length, SR-52 gradually ascends through the Utah Valley along 800 North, ending at US-189 where the valley gives way to the Wasatch Range and that highway enters Provo Canyon. A mid-1980s flyover takes traffic directly from SR-52 onto US-189 north in the canyon.

SR-52 is in the National Highway System as a connection between I-15 and US-189. A project to widen about half the length of the road through Orem from four to six lanes was completed in October 2008.

== History ==
The road from SR-1 (US-91, now US-89) in Orem east to SR-7 (now US-189) at the mouth of Provo Canyon became a state highway in 1923. It was numbered as a spur of SR-7 in 1927, but in 1931 it was split off as State Route 52. In order to serve the planned Interstate 15, SR-52 was extended west to that road in 1959, and in 1964 the extension was continued to SR-114 (simultaneously with a similar extension of SR-265).

== Major intersections ==
The entire route is in Orem, Utah County.

| mi | km | Destinations | Notes |
|---|---|---|---|
| 0.000 | 0.000 | SR-114 (Geneva Road) / SR-176 | Western terminus; 800 North continues west as SR-176 |
| 0.464 | 0.747 | I-15 – Salt Lake City, Las Vegas | Exit 272 on I-15, single-point urban interchange |
| 1.758 | 2.829 | US 89 (State Street) | |
| 4.122 | 6.634 | US 189 (University Avenue) – Heber City, Provo | Interchange |
1.000 mi = 1.609 km; 1.000 km = 0.621 mi
