= Marriott Center =

College basketball arena in Provo, Utah, United States

J. Willard Marriott Center
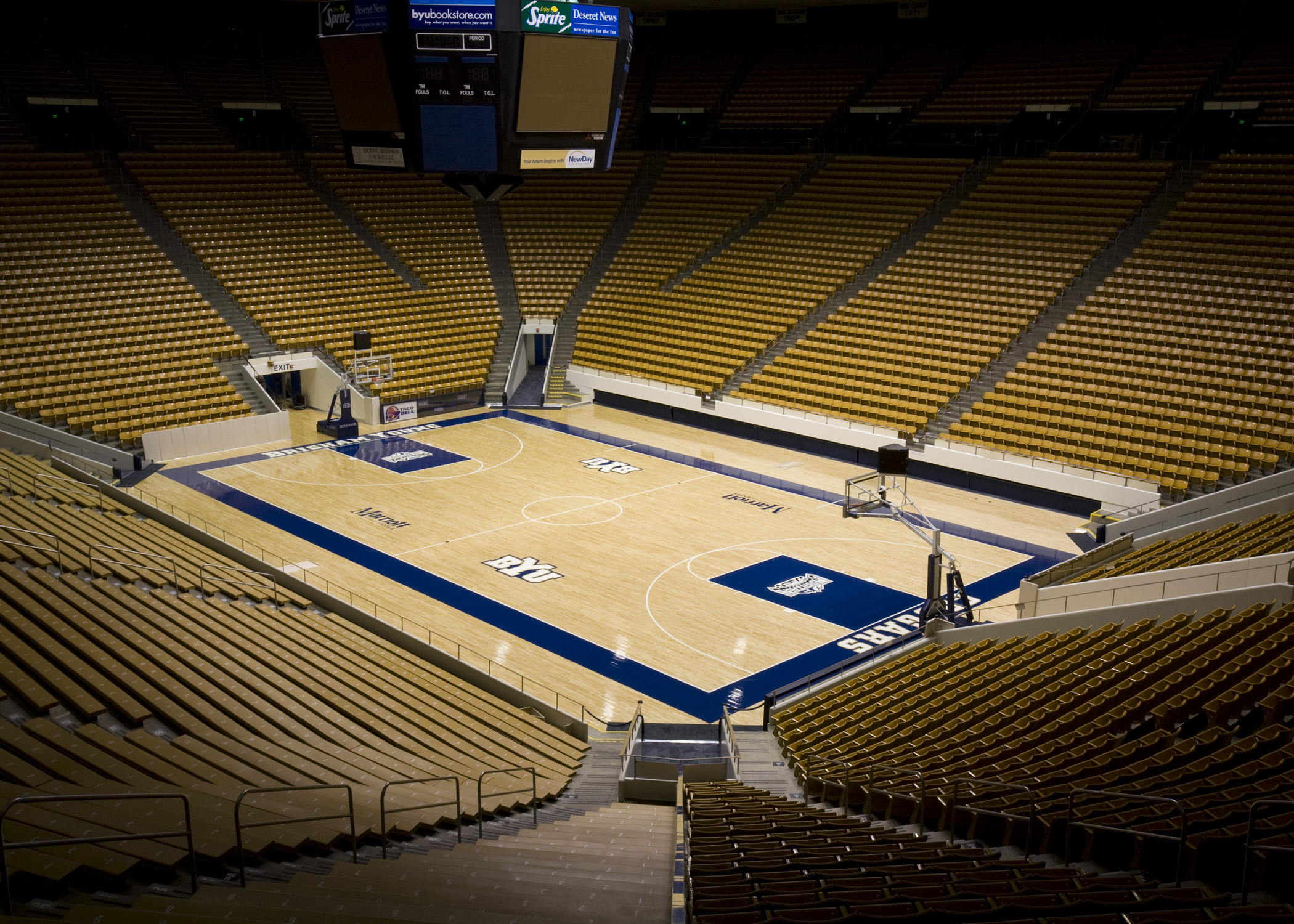
- Marriott Center in 2006

- Location in the United States Location in Utah
- Address: 701 East University Parkway
- Location: Brigham Young University; Provo, Utah, U.S.
- Coordinates: 40.254°N 111.649°W
- Owner: Brigham Young University
- Capacity: 22,700 (1971–2012); 20,951 (2012–2015); 18,987 (2015–2022); 17,978 (2022-present)
- Public transit: UVX (at BYU Stadium station)

Construction
- Opened: 1971; 55 years ago

Tenants
- BYU men's basketball BYU women's basketball

The Marriott Center is a multi-purpose arena in the western United States, located on the campus of Brigham Young University (BYU) in Provo, Utah. It is home to the BYU Cougars men's and women's basketball teams. The seating capacity for basketball games at the Marriott Center is officially 18,978. It is the largest basketball arena in the Big 12 Conference and is among the largest on-campus basketball arenas in the nation.

In addition to basketball, the Marriott Center is used for weekly campus devotionals and forums.

The elevation of the court is approximately 4,650 feet (1,420 m) above sea level.

== History ==
The Marriott Center was named in honor of benefactor and hotel tycoon J. Willard Marriott, founder of the Marriott Corporation. When the arena opened 55 years ago in 1971, it passed the University of Minnesota's Williams Arena as the largest college basketball arena in the nation. It was also the largest venue in the nation built for basketball, larger than any NBA (or ABA) arena at that time. It lost both distinctions when the University of Kentucky opened Rupp Arena in 1976 but remained as the largest basketball-specific facility on a U.S. college campus until 1987, when the University of Tennessee opened Thompson–Boling Arena.

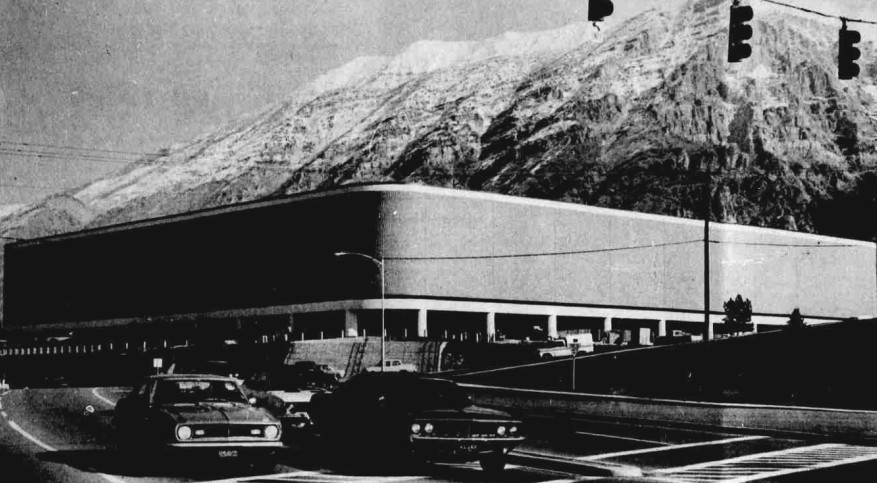
The Marriott Center, circa 1971

Prior to 1971, the Cougars played basketball games at the Smith Fieldhouse, which remains the primary venue for volleyball and gymnastics. The court was replaced in 2003 with a permanent floor.

The Marriott Center has hosted the West Regionals of the NCAA Division I men's basketball tournament four times (1972, 1977, 1979, 1982), and the Western Athletic Conference men's basketball tournament in 1988.

On February 7, 1993, Cody Judy threatened Howard W. Hunter, president of the Quorum of Twelve Apostles of the Church of Jesus Christ of Latter-day Saints (LDS Church), with a supposed bomb in front of a crowd of 15,000–17,000 onlookers in the Marriott Center.

A devotional gathering featuring Gordon B. Hinckley, the LDS Church's president, on October 17, 1995, drew the largest crowd to ever attend an activity at the arena: 25,875 people.

In 1999, the Marriott Center set an NCAA record for highest attendance for a men's volleyball match: 14,156 volleyball enthusiasts watched BYU defeat Long Beach State on February 19, shattering the previous record of 10,225 (held by Hawaii).

== Renovations ==
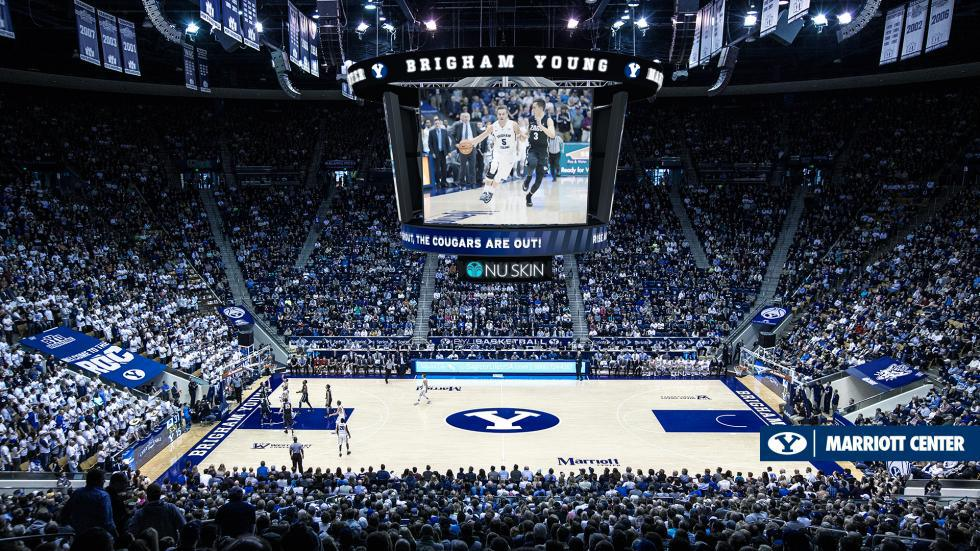
The Marriott Center in 2017

In April 2012, BYU announced renovations to the Marriott Center. The lower bench seating on the north side was replaced with prime chair seating. A new sound system was installed, and the men's and women's locker rooms were renovated. The changes in the lower seating lowered the Marriott Center’s capacity from 22,700 to 20,951.

The remaining lower bench seating was replaced after the 2015 season, lowering seating capacity to around 19,000. The new renovation also installed new video boards in the arena and added the Marriott Center Annex building, where practice sessions take place for both BYU's men's and women's basketball teams. The Marriott Center Annex was placed between the Marriott Center and the BYU Broadcasting Building.

Seating was updated again in 2022, lowering the capacity to 17,978.

The Marriott Center has the largest seating capacity of any basketball arena in the Big 12 Conference. As of October 2021, it had the eighth largest seating capacity of on-campus basketball arenas in the United States.

== See also ==
- List of NCAA Division I basketball arenas
