= Provo Towne Centre =

- Location: Provo, Utah, United States
- Coordinates: 40.2175°N 111.6631°W
- Address: 1200 S. Towne Centre Blvd.
- Opened: 1998
- Developer: JP Realty
- Manager: JLL
- Owner: Brixton Capital
- Num. of stores: 74
- Num. of anchor tenants: 4
- Floor area: 801,601 sq ft (74,471.2 m^{2})
- Floors: 2 (1 in Cinemark & )

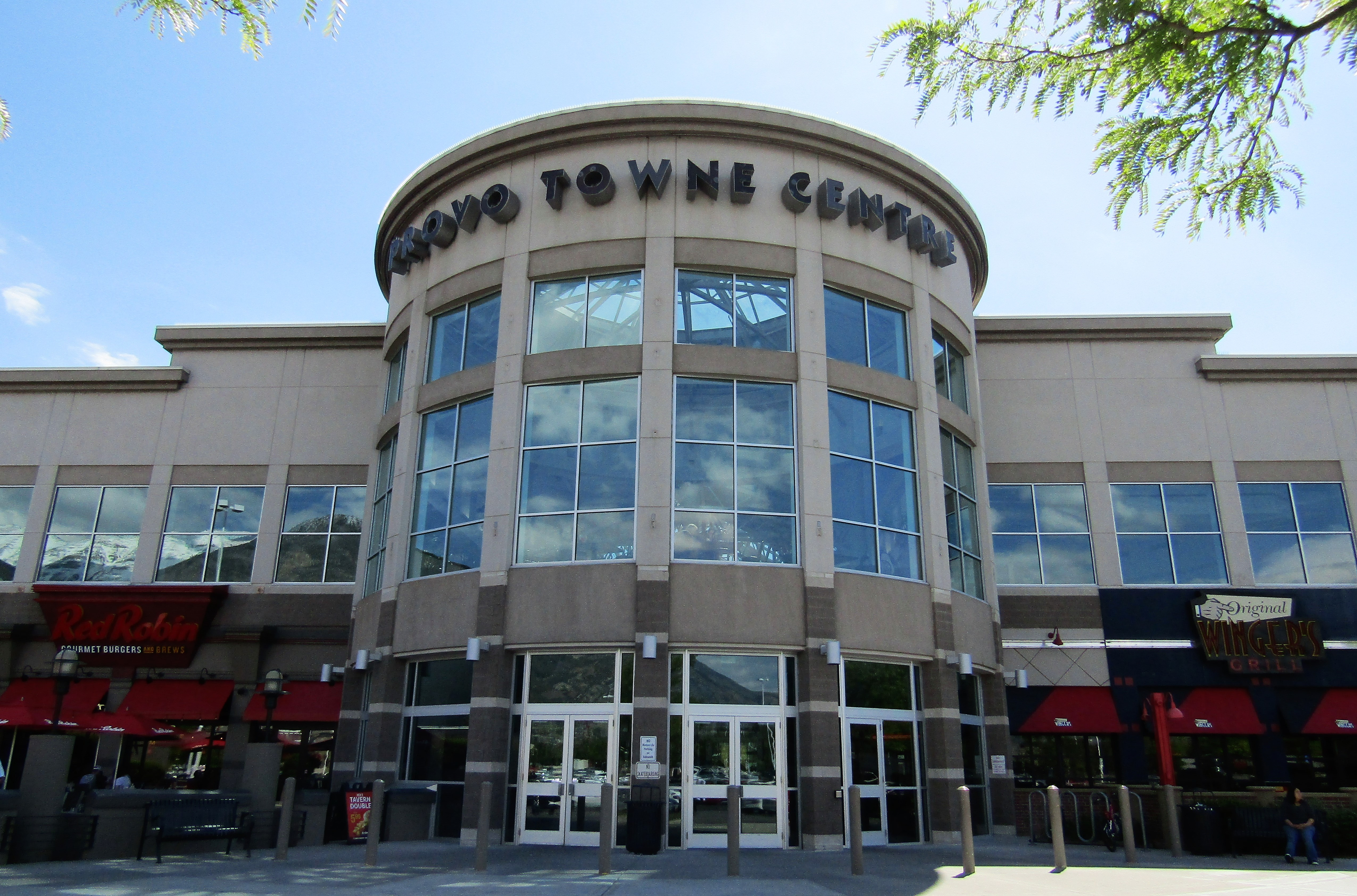

Provo Towne Centre is an enclosed shopping mall in Provo, Utah. Opened in 1998, the mall is anchored by JCPenney, Target, and a Cinemark movie theater. The mall is managed by JLL.

== History ==
When the mall was being built, developers JP Realty filed a lawsuit against the city of Orem for offering incentives to keep ZCMI from relocating its store from University Mall. Also, the Provo city council wanted JP Realty to call the mall "Utah Valley Towne Centre" instead.

The mall ultimately opened in 1998, and JCPenney relocated from University Mall to Provo. General Growth Properties acquired the mall in 2002 when it purchased JP Realty's portfolio.

Brixton Capital purchased the mall in February 2016, and JLL manages the mall.

When the mall opened, it was originally anchored by Sears, Cinemark, JCPenney, and Dillard's.

Most of the 2008 MTV musical production American Mall was filmed at the Provo Towne Centre.

On May 5, 2017, it was announced Sears would be closing the Provo location as part of a plan to close 30 stores nationwide. The store closed in July 2017. Plans were announced for redevelopment of the Sears location, but no specific details were offered. In 2020, an automobile museum called Automotive Addiction opened on the first floor of the former Sears.

A mass transit station opened on the east side of the mall near JCPenney in August 2018 as part of the UVX system between Orem and Provo operated by the Utah Transit Authority. The station is called Towne Centre Boulevard.

On January 15, 2020, Dillard's announced they would leave the Provo Towne Centre and move to University Place in Orem in early 2021. On February 7, 2023, it was announced Target would occupy the space formerly used by Dillard's. On April 9, 2024, Target opened. Per Target company request, this location can be accessed only from the exterior and has no entry from other parts of the mall.

In February 2024, Automotive Addiction moved to the lower level of the former Sears.

As of 2026, the upper floor of the former Sears is occupied by two businesses: Hypercraft Ground Systems, which is a manufacturer of remote controlled and autonomous vehicles, and the software company Atonom.

In October 2026, Provo's city council voted in 5-1 favor of a redevelopment plan that would demolish most of the existing Town Centre structure. Council members cited major declines in customers and spending at the mall in recent years, along with concerns the area was at risk of becoming blighted. The anchor stores will remain, including JCPenny, Target and Cinemark, with new additions of about 1,300 apartment units and 77 townhomes plus new retail spaces.

== Anchors ==
- JCPenney
- Cinemark
- Corporation

=== Former anchors ===
- Dillard's
- Sears
