= Christeele Acres Historic District =

Historic district in Utah, United States

- U.S. National Register of Historic Places
- U.S. Historic district
- Location within Utah Location within the United States
- Location: Roughly bounded by State St., 900 South, 450 East, and 1010 South, Orem, Utah
- Coordinates: 40°16′46″N 111°41′6″W
- Area: 10.5 acres (4.2 ha)
- Built: 1943
- Architectural style: FHA minimum house
- MPS: Orem, Utah MPS
- NRHP reference No.: 99001626
- Added to NRHP: December 30, 1999

Christeele Acres Historic District is a residential subdivision in Orem, Utah, built in 1943 as housing for workers at the Geneva Steel plant during World War II. The historic district includes 62 single-family houses and three duplexes. The houses were built to Federal Housing Administration (FHA) "minimum house" standards, which were considered to be the minimum size of a house necessary for a family with three persons or a family with two small children. The houses had two bedrooms and approximately 700 square feet (65 m^{2}) of living space.

In May 1941, the United States government asked U.S. Steel to ramp up plans to build steel plants to service shipyards on the Pacific Coast. Most of the steel plants in the United States at this time were in the eastern United States, and there was not enough railroad capacity to bring all of the necessary steel westward. At the same time, a steel plant located directly on the coast would have been vulnerable to a coastal invasion, so the decision was made to build the plant inland. On February 4, 1942, the government announced plans to build the steel plant in Orem.

The construction and operation of the steel plant required several thousand construction workers, which in turn required housing. The situation in Orem was similar to that in many other cities where defense industries were located. The housing shortage was most acute in 1942, where workers flocked to cities where war production was thriving, only to find that there was not enough housing available. President Franklin D. Roosevelt established the National Housing Agency to oversee sixteen government programs that were responsible for housing. This included the Federal Housing Administration (FHA). The Federal Public Housing Authority was assigned to build the necessary public housing for the war effort, while the FHA provided mortgage underwriting.

The FHA "minimum house" program was an outgrowth of the Great Depression, when the home building industry slowed severely and mortgage foreclosures were rising sharply. The FHA sponsored a conference targeted at reforming the home financing structure in the United States, improving the affordability of housing for the middle and lower income groups, and stimulating the homebuilding industry. In 1936, the FHA published a book, Principles of Planning Small Houses, which featured five different home patterns. The main design principle was, "providing a maximum accommodation within a minimum of means," so the floor plans omitted nonessential spaces and unnecessary ornamentation. The conference also planned labor- and time-saving construction methods, standard building codes, and basic requirements for heating, ventilation, and air conditioning, plumbing, and electrical systems. The house plans could be built with a variety of materials, such as wood, brick, concrete block, shingles, stucco, or stone. Houses could be customized by varying the external finish types, placement on the lot, or other changes, giving the neighborhood a more pleasing appearance. The experience of builders who built homes on a large scale gave rise to the trend of tract housing.

The War Production Board had jurisdiction over raw materials that could be used to produce houses, so the FHA had to justify the need for those materials. At the same time, the National Housing Agency did not want to build temporary dormitories or shanties that would end up abandoned after the war. The war workers had families and needed to be treated as civilians, not as soldiers. The FHA wanted the housing to remain as livable communities long after the war ended. During the process of negotiation with the War Production Board, tight standards were enacted, in order to reduce the amount of lumber and metal in the production process. One standard even specified how many brass keys could be made per lock. An April 1945 report noted that over 800,000 houses had been built and would remain a permanent part of the nation's housing stock.

The district is considered significant within the history of Orem, at a time when the city was evolving from a farm village into a large city with industrial and commercial development. The government programs, which produced wartime defense housing, later influenced postwar subdivision development. The National Register nomination cites its importance within social history, politics and government, industry, and military areas.
