= Utah State Route 114 =

State highway in Utah, United States

State Route 114
- SR-114 highlighted in red

Route information
- Maintained by UDOT
- Length: 10.845 mi (17.453 km)
- Existed: 1931–present

Major junctions
- South end: US 89 in Provo
- I-15 in Provo; SR-52 in Orem
- North end: US 89 in Pleasant Grove

Location
- Country: United States
- State: Utah

Highway system
- Utah State Highway System; Interstate; US; State; Minor; Scenic
← SR-113	→ SR-115

State Route 114 (SR-114) is a state highway in the US state of Utah that spans 10.79 miles (17.36 km) in Utah County. The route forms a loop around US-89 and roughly parallels the coast of Utah Lake as it passes through the west side of Provo, Lindon and Orem, eventually terminating in Pleasant Grove. The highway consists of a portion of Center Street and all of Geneva Road. The highway was formed in 1931, the southern terminus initially extending into the east side of Provo. In 1965, the route was truncated to its present state.

== Route description ==
The route begins at the intersection of 500 West (US-89) and Center Street in Provo, with SR-114 heading west on the latter, a four-lane highway. The route reaches an interchange at I-15, where it narrows down to one lane in each direction. The highway continues west on Center Street before reaching Geneva Road—a two-lane highway—where the route turns north onto. Geneva Road turns northwest before intersecting with 820 North. Now the first road east of Utah Lake, the road curves in a more north-northwesterly direction while entering Orem. The road also begins to parallel I-15 at this point, also intersecting University Parkway (SR-265) where it becomes a five lane highway. Past 800 South, SR-114 turns north and intersects Orem's Center Street. Turning north-northwest again, the highway crosses 800 North (SR-52) and passes under I-15 before turning north one final time, and entering Pleasant Grove. The road terminates at State Street (US-89).

The entire route has been listed as part of the National Highway System.

== History ==
State Route 114 was established in 1931, forming the current loop around US-89—which at that time was cosigned with US-91—and serving the east shore of Utah Lake in the Provo area. In 1963, the route was extended east to end at the State Mental Hospital. This change was reverted in 1965, but the portion of Center Street between Seven Peaks Boulevard and the state mental hospital was restored in 1969 as SR-294.

== Major intersections ==
The entire route is in Utah County.

Location	mi	km	Destinations	Notes
Provo	0.000	0.000	US 89 (500 West)	Southern terminus
Provo	1.061	1.708	I-15 – Las Vegas, Salt Lake City	Exit 265 on I-15
Orem	4.962	7.986	SR-265 east (University Parkway)	
Orem	7.591	12.217	SR-52 east (800 North) / SR-176 west (Vineyard Connector Road) – Heber City, Vineyard	
Orem	8.594	13.831	SR-241 east (1600 North)	
Lindon	10.290	16.560	SR-129 (North County Boulevard)	
Pleasant Grove	10.787	17.360	US 89 (State Street)	Northern terminus
1.000 mi = 1.609 km; 1.000 km = 0.621 mi
