= Utah State Route 265 =

Highway in Utah

State Route 265
- University Parkway

Route information
- Maintained by UDOT
- Length: 4.336 mi (6.978 km)
- Existed: 1959–present

Major junctions
- West end: SR-114 in Orem
- I-15 in Orem; US 89 in Orem
- East end: US 189 in Provo

Location
- Country: United States
- State: Utah

Highway system
- Utah State Highway System; Interstate; US; State; Minor; Scenic
← SR-264	→ SR-266

State Route 265 is a west–east thoroughfare completely within Utah County in northern Utah that cuts through Orem and Provo. Utah Valley University and Brigham Young University are in close proximity to SR-265. The entirety of the route is named University Parkway.

== Route description ==
SR-265 begins at the intersection of Geneva Road (SR-114) and University Parkway, heads due east on the latter as a four-lane highway. After crossing Interstate 15, the road widens to six lanes. As the highway passes Utah Valley University, it gains dedicated bus lanes in the median for the Utah Valley Express bus rapid transit system. It continues east for a short time until turning briefly southeast and then straightening out again, heading due east through Orem. Shortly after passing an intersection with US-89 (State Street), the route turns southeast, crossing the Provo River and entering the city limits of Provo. Soon after, the route reaches its eastern terminus, US-189.

The portions of SR-265 east of the I-15 interchange are included in the National Highway System.

== History ==
The State Road Commission designated the initial segment of SR-265, from proposed I-15 east to SR-1 (US-89/US-91), in 1959. That same year, a short State Route 267 was created on Bulldog Boulevard in Provo between SR-1 (500 West) and University Avenue (now, but not then, US-189) near Brigham Young University. Two extensions to SR-265 were made in 1964 - one southeast to SR-7 (US-189) near the university, and another west to SR-114. At the same time, SR-267, which was several blocks south of the extended SR-265, was given back to the city.

== Major intersections ==
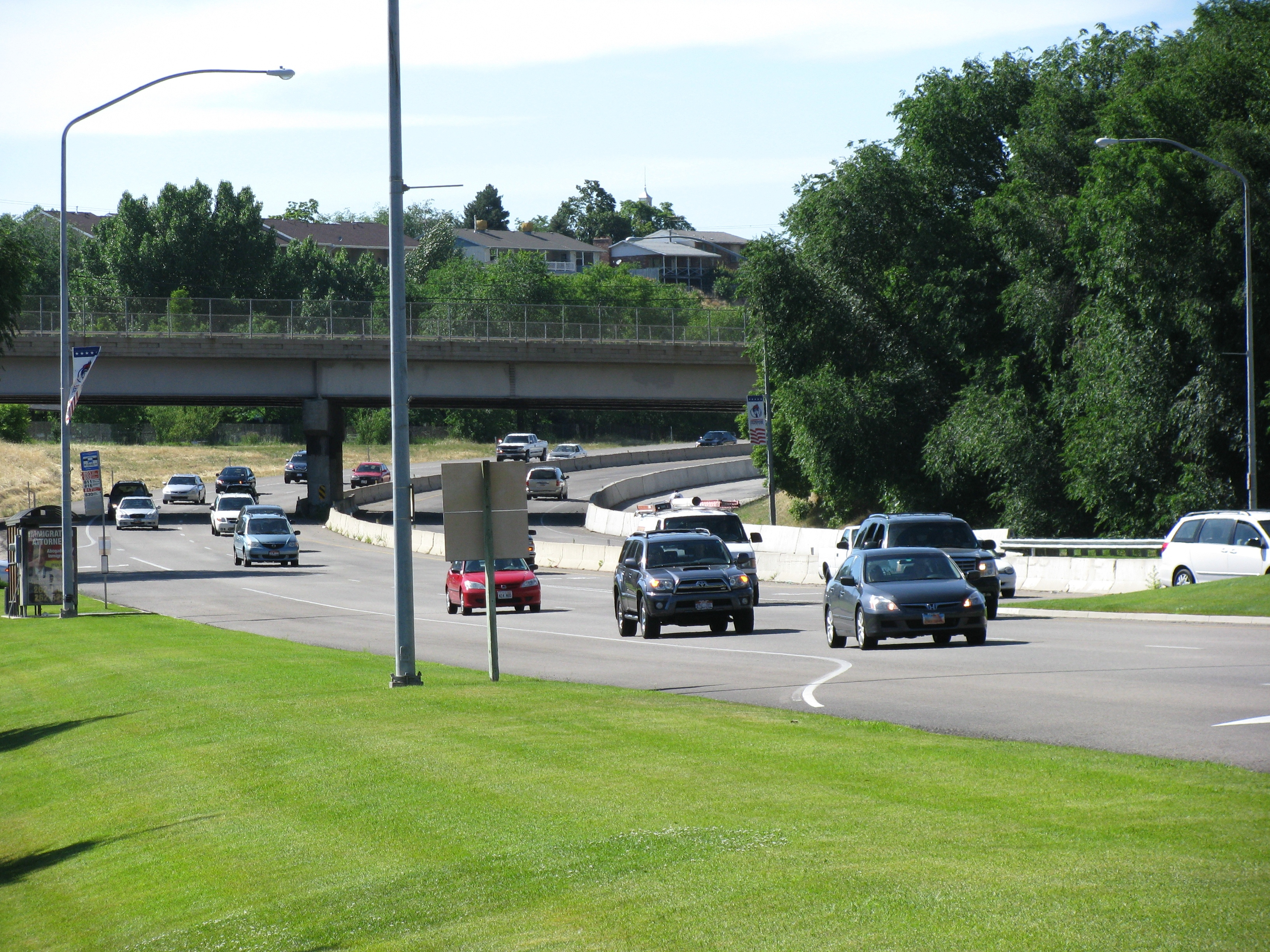
SR-265 nearing its eastern terminus of US-189

The entire route is in Utah County.

Location	mi	km	Destinations	Notes
Orem	0.000	0.000	SR-114 (Geneva Road) – Pleasant Grove	Western terminus
Orem	0.423	0.681	I-15 – Nephi, Salt Lake City	Exit 269 on I-15
Orem	2.276	3.663	US 89 (State Street) – Springville, Orem	
Provo	4.336	6.978	US 189 (University Avenue) – Heber City	Eastern terminus
1.000 mi = 1.609 km; 1.000 km = 0.621 mi
