= University Place (Utah) =

- Location: Orem, Utah
- Coordinates: 40°16′30″N 111°40′45″W
- Address: 575 East University Parkway
- Opened: March 1973; 53 years ago
- Previous names: University Mall (1973–2015)
- Developer: Wallace R. Woodbury
- Owner: Woodbury Corporation
- Num. of stores: 150+
- Num. of anchor tenants: 3
- Floor area: 1,500,000 sq ft (140,000 m^{2})
- Floors: 1 (2 in Dillard's and RC Willey)
- Parking: 5,400 spaces
- Website: www.universityplaceorem.com

University Place, previously known as University Mall, is a single-story shopping mall located in Orem, Utah, United States. It currently has three anchor stores: Dillard's, RC Willey, and Al's Sporting Goods (formerly Sports Authority). The mall is owned and managed by Woodbury Corporation. With 1,500,000 square feet (140,000 m^{2}) of retail space and 5,400 parking spaces, it was once the largest shopping mall in Utah.

== History ==
University Mall opened for business in March 1973, with ZCMI and JCPenney as anchor stores. Mervyn's was added as a third anchor in 1981.

JCPenney closed in 1998, relocating to the then-new Provo Towne Centre in nearby Provo. The former JCPenney space was converted to a new mall wing, which included a food court and a Sports Authority store. Nordstrom opened as the new wing's anchor on March 29, 2002.

In 2003, the Woodbury Art Museum, operated by Utah Valley State College, opened, featuring students' artwork.

On November 23, 1999, Costco opened a store to the north of the mall.

ZCMI was rebranded as Meier & Frank in 2002, after the Church of Jesus Christ of Latter-day Saints sold the chain to the May Company. The store was rebranded again as Macy's in 2006 after Macy's acquired May.

Mervyn's closed in 2008, as part of the chain's liquidation. The store's former space sat vacant until its demolition in 2015.

Nordstrom closed on February 24, 2012, relocating to the City Creek Center in Salt Lake City. The space was converted to an RC Willey store, which opened on April 16, 2015.

In 2013, the Woodbury Corporation announced a major revitalization project for the mall, which includes the demolition of the former Mervyn's, the addition of new office and retail spaces, new green spaces, new residential spaces, new hotels, and new parking garages.

The 2015 renovations included the addition of office space and housing and the addition of an entertainment venue called "The Orchard". The mall was then rebranded as University Place.

Sports Authority closed in August 2016 as part of the chain's Chapter 7 bankruptcy and liquidation. It was replaced by local chain Al's Sporting Goods, which opened in October 2017.

Trader Joe's opened a store in the mall's outlot on July 27, 2018.

On April 25, 2019, it was announced that Macy's would be closing as part of a plan to close 13 stores nationwide. The store closed in the summer of 2019, and was demolished in January 2020.

On January 15, 2020, Dillard's announced that they would open a store on the site of the former Macy's in early 2021, replacing their location at Provo Towne Centre. The store opened on March 21, 2022.
