= Orem, Utah =

- City
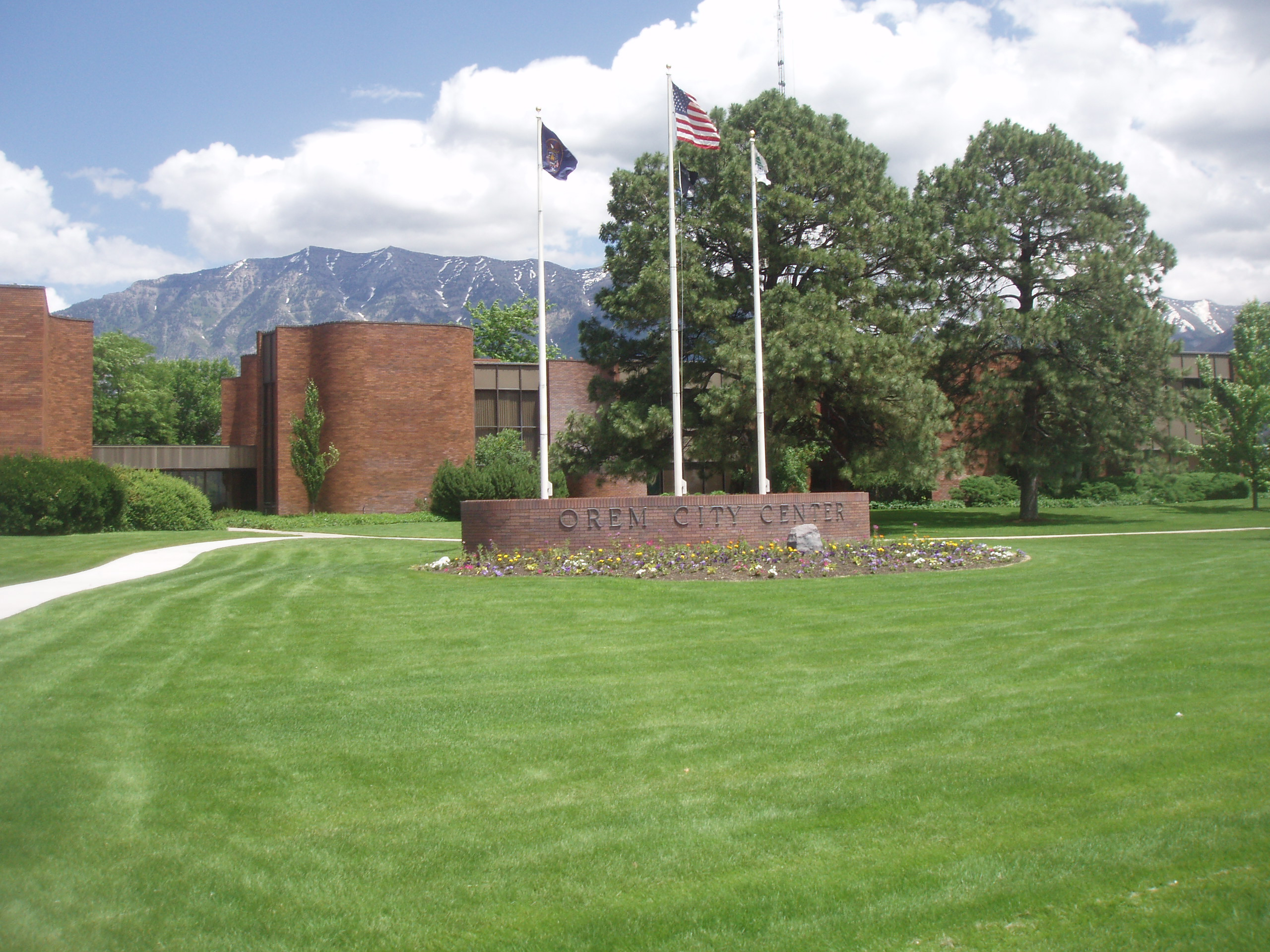
- Orem City Center

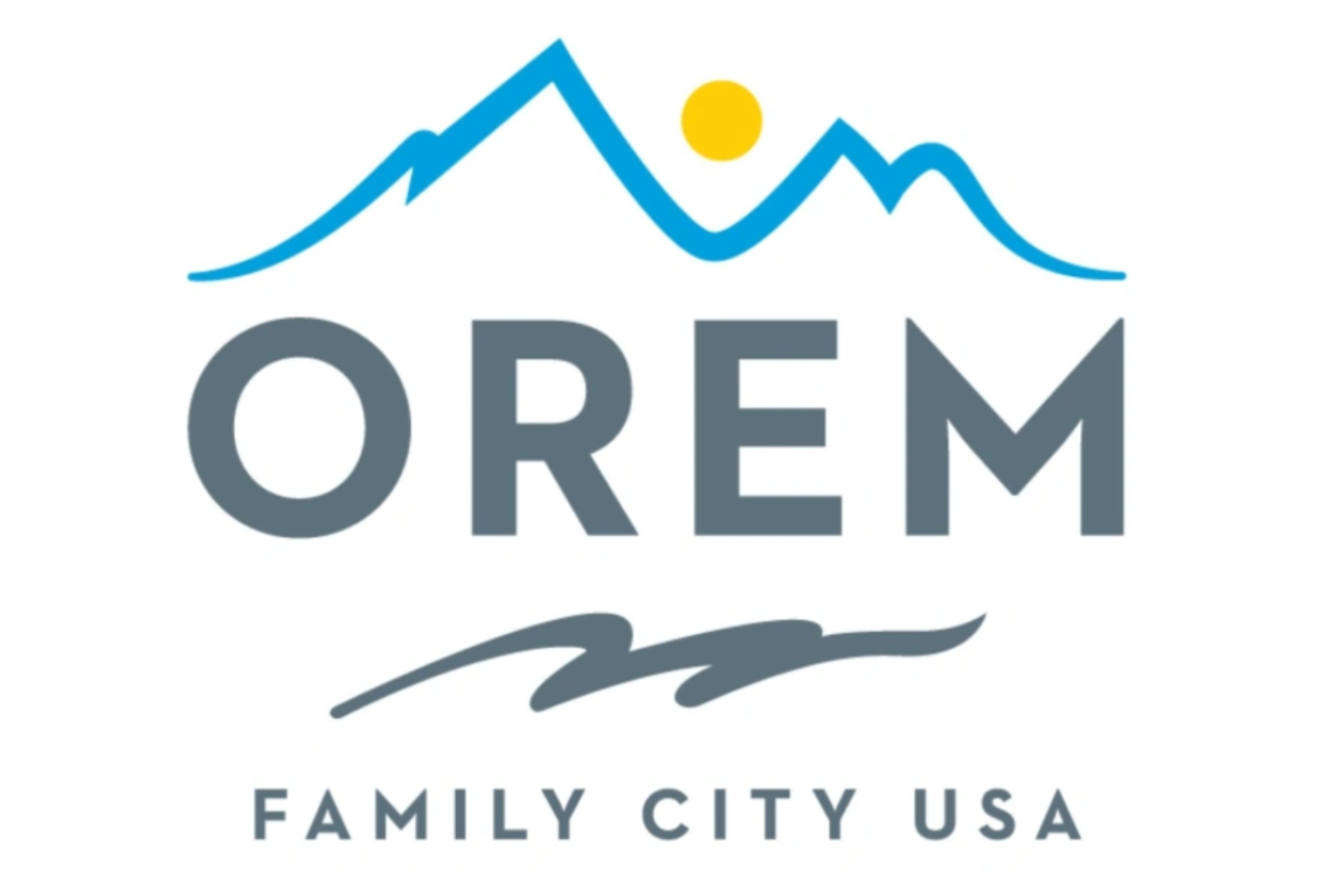
- Flag
- Nickname: Family City USA
- Interactive map of Orem
- Location within Utah Location within the United States
- Coordinates: 40°17′26″N 111°43′47″W
- Country: United States
- State: Utah
- County: Utah
- Settled: 1877
- Town charter granted: May 5, 1919
- Named for: Walter C. Orem

Government
  - Mayor: Karen McCandless

Area
  - Total: 18.57 sq mi (48.10 km^{2})
  - Land: 18.57 sq mi (48.10 km^{2})
  - Water: 0 sq mi (0.00 km^{2})
- Elevation: 4,767 ft (1,453 m)

Population (2020)
  - Total: 98,129
  - Density: 5,267.2/sq mi (2,033.67/km^{2})
- Time zone: UTC-7 (Mountain (MST))
  - Summer (DST): UTC-6 (MDT)
- Area codes: 385, 801
- FIPS code: 49-57300
- GNIS feature ID: 2411333
- Website: orem.gov

Orem is a city in Utah County, Utah, United States, in the north central part of the state. It is adjacent to Provo, Lindon, and Vineyard and is approximately 45 miles (72 km) south of Salt Lake City.

Orem is one of the principal cities of the Provo-Orem, Utah Metropolitan Statistical Area, which includes all of Utah and Juab counties. The 2020 population was 98,129, while the 2010 population was 88,328 making it the 5th most populous city in Utah. Utah Valley University is located in Orem.

== History ==
At one time the area was known as Sharon, a Biblical name for a mostly level strip of land running between mountains and the sea, and the name of the Vermont birth town of Joseph Smith, founder of the Latter Day Saint movement. Another former name was Provo Bench, as it was a geographical bench north of Provo.

Unlike many other early Utah communities, Orem's houses were not originally clustered in a town composed of regular city blocks. Instead, Orem's farmers dispersed their homes, building them along the territorial highway (now called State Street) and other major roads so that they could be close to both transportation corridors and to their fields and orchards.

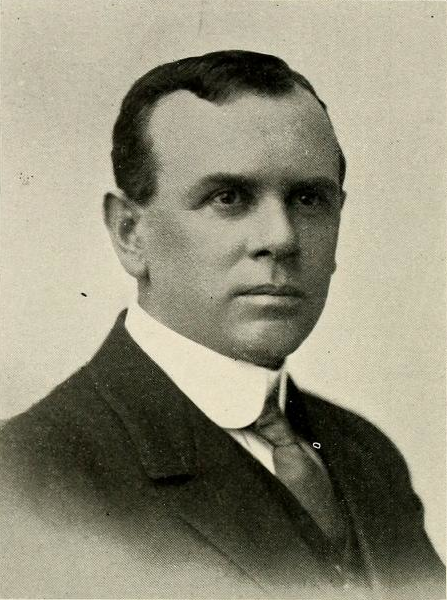
Walter C. Orem, namesake of the city

In an apparent attempt to attract more investment to the town and provide an easy way for the large population of farmers with orchards to ship produce, in 1914 it was named after Walter C. Orem, President of the Salt Lake and Utah Railroad in the early 1900s. Orem was incorporated on May 5, 1919.

On September 10, 2025, American right-wing activist and co-founder of Turning Point USA, Charlie Kirk, was assassinated at Utah Valley University. He was brought to Timpanogos Regional Hospital, where he was pronounced dead at 2:40 PM MDT (UTC-7:00).

== Geography ==
Orem is in a high desert, with an average elevation of 4,767 ft (1,453 m). According to the United States Census Bureau, the city covers an area of 18.4 sq mi (48 km^{2}), all land. Orem is near the eastern shore of Utah Lake, bordering Provo on the east and south, Vineyard to the west, Lindon contiguous to the north, and Mount Timpanogos/Wasatch Mountain range to the east.

== Demographics ==
Historical population
Census	Pop.	Note	%±
1890	435		—
1900	692		59.1%
1910	1,064		53.8%
1920	1,664		56.4%
1930	1,915		15.1%
1940	2,914		52.2%
1950	8,351		186.6%
1960	18,394		120.3%
1970	25,729		39.9%
1980	52,399		103.7%
1990	67,561		28.9%
2000	84,324		24.8%
2010	88,328		4.7%
2020	98,129		11.1%
U.S. Decennial Census

=== Racial and ethnic composition ===
Orem, Utah – Racial and ethnic composition Note: the US Census treats Hispanic/Latino as an ethnic category. This table excludes Latinos from the racial categories and assigns them to a separate category. Hispanics/Latinos may be of any race.
Race / Ethnicity (NH = Non-Hispanic)	Pop. 2000	Pop. 2010	Pop. 2020	% 2000	% 2010	% 2020
White alone (NH)	73,076	68,433	68,948	86.66%	77.48%	70.26%
Black or African American alone (NH)	267	524	866	0.32%	0.59%	0.88%
Native American or Alaska Native alone (NH)	521	528	485	0.62%	0.60%	0.49%
Asian alone (NH)	1,202	1,688	1,968	1.43%	1.91%	2.01%
Pacific Islander alone (NH)	710	856	1,409	0.84%	0.97%	1.44%
Other race alone (NH)	103	162	469	0.12%	0.18%	0.48%
Mixed race or Multiracial (NH)	1,228	1,913	4,130	1.46%	2.17%	4.21%
Hispanic or Latino (any race)	7,217	14,224	19,854	8.56%	16.10%	20.23%
Total	84,324	88,328	98,129	100.00%	100.00%	100.00%

=== 2020 census ===
As of the 2020 census, Orem had a population of 98,129. The median age was 27.2 years. 27.2% of residents were under the age of 18 and 10.5% of residents were 65 years of age or older. For every 100 females there were 102.0 males, and for every 100 females age 18 and over there were 99.7 males age 18 and over.

99.9% of residents lived in urban areas, while 0.1% lived in rural areas.

There were 29,920 households in Orem, of which 38.3% had children under the age of 18 living in them. Of all households, 59.3% were married-couple households, 15.8% were households with a male householder and no spouse or partner present, and 21.8% were households with a female householder and no spouse or partner present. About 16.4% of all households were made up of individuals and 6.1% had someone living alone who was 65 years of age or older.

There were 31,591 housing units, of which 5.3% were vacant. The homeowner vacancy rate was 0.6% and the rental vacancy rate was 6.4%.

Racial composition as of the 2020 census
Race	Number	Percent
White	72,570	74.0%
Black or African American	919	0.9%
American Indian and Alaska Native	1,010	1.0%
Asian	2,020	2.1%
Native Hawaiian and Other Pacific Islander	1,450	1.5%
Some other race	9,307	9.5%
Two or more races	10,853	11.1%
Hispanic or Latino (of any race)	19,854	20.2%

=== 2010 census ===
The 2010 census counted 88,328 residents in Orem, and as of 2011 the 88,112 residents of Orem had a racial and ethnic composition of 89.3% white, 0.9% black or African American, 0.9% Native American, 1.6% Asian, 0.5% Pacific Islander Americans, 4% non-Hispanics reporting some other race, 2.9% two or more races reported and 14.8% Hispanic, as Orem has a large Mexican American community with other Latinos residing in the city. This contrasts with the census of 2000, which showed a racial makeup of 90.80% White, 0.33% African American, 0.73% Native American, 1.45% Asian, 0.86% Pacific Islander, 3.64% from other races, and 2.18% from two or more races. Hispanic or Latino of any race were 8.56% of the population.

=== 2000 census ===
The 2000 Census counted 84,324 people, 23,382 households, and 19,079 families. The population density at that time was 4,572.6 people per square mile (1,765.5 people/km^{2}). There were 24,166 housing units at an average density of 1,310.4 per square mile (505.9/km^{2}). There were 23,382 households, out of which 48.8% had children under the age of 18 living with them, 69.0% were married couples living together, 9.5% had a female householder with no husband present, and 18.4% were non-families. 12.4% of all households were made up of individuals, and 5.1% had someone living alone who was 65 years of age or older. The average household size was 3.57 and the average family size was 3.93.

In the city, the population was spread out, with 35.4% under the age of 18, 17.4% from 18 to 24, 25.8% from 25 to 44, 14.5% from 45 to 64, and 6.9% who were 65 years of age or older. The median age was 24 years. For every 100 females, there were 98.7 males. For every 100 females age 18 and over, there were 95.2 males.

The median income for a household in the city was $52,703, and the median income for a family was $59,066. Males had a median income of $42,249 versus $30,742 for females. The per capita income for the city was $20,971. About 10.3% of families and 13.8% of the population were below the poverty line, including 16% of those under age 18 and 6% of those age 65 or over.

=== Religion ===
As of 2020, 95.7% of all church-going citizens of Orem are members of the Church of Jesus Christ of Latter-day Saints. Due to the high numbers of Latter-day Saints in the area, Church President Russell M. Nelson announced a temple in Orem on October 5, 2019. The temple is located 0.5 miles (800 m) south of the Interstate 15 exit at University Parkway on South Geneva Road.

== Economy ==
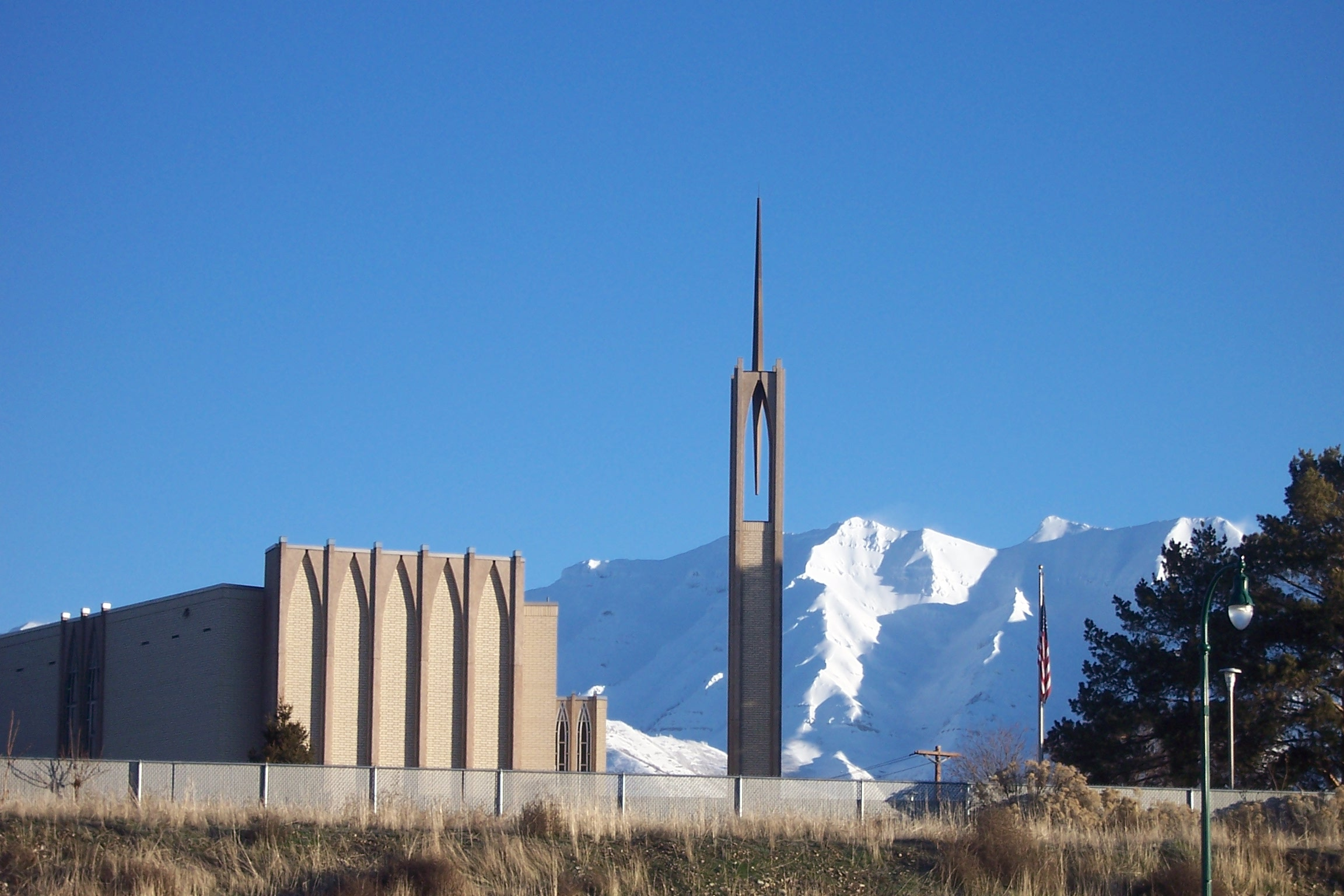
A meetinghouse of the Church of Jesus Christ of Latter-day Saints in Orem set against winter mountain backdrop

Orem has a wide variety of stores and businesses. It is also home to University Place, Utah County's oldest mall, opened in March 1973.

=== Top employers ===
According to the city's 2023 Comprehensive Annual Financial Report, the city's top employers are:

#	Employer	# of employees	Percent of Total City Employment
1	Utah Valley University	3,030	5.9%
2	Alpine School District	1,222	2.4%
3	City of Orem	569	1.1%
4	Timpanogos Regional Hospital	507	1.0%
5	Avetta, LLC	500	1.0%
6	Wal-Mart	499	1.0%
7	Target Corporation	409	0.8%
8	United Parcel Service, Inc.	360	0.7%
9	Costco	350	0.7%
10	U.S. Synthetic Corporation	347	0.7%
	Total	7,793	15.3%

=== Company startups ===
Several notable companies started in Orem:

- Blendtec
- Caldera
- Fishbowl Inventory
- Mity-Lite
- Novell (now owned by Micro Focus)
- Omniture (now owned by Adobe Systems)
- PowerQuest
- Wahoo Studios
- WordPerfect (now owned by Corel, it was first named Satellite Software International and used Orem City Center as its headquarters for a time in offices the city had available in the basement)

== Arts and culture ==
=== Annual cultural events ===
Oremfest is an annual, multi-day summer festival that has included different activities over the years, but most recently has featured a charity golf tournament, pool party, outdoor concert, volunteer opportunities, car show, and parade. Oremfest originated in 1949 to celebrate the completion of State Street. Other events traditionally included in the festival: a baby contest, a boutique, the Rotary Club Breakfast, a 5K Fun Run, fireworks, a carnival, and vendor booths.

The festival came to be known as Summerfest, until Orem city officials received a cease-and-desist letter in 2022 from Milwaukee World Festival Inc., based on that city's Summerfest music festival trademark and usage of the name dating back to 1969. In lieu of signing a licensing agreement to use the Summerfest name, the Orem city council opted instead to rebrand to Oremfest. Other Utah cities like South Jordan, however, obtained permission use the trademarked Summerfest name for their own festivals.

As of 2025, other city arts and cultural events through fall and winter include:

- 9/11 Day of Service
- "Taste of Orem" (food festival)
- Harvest Festival
- Veteran's Day Program
- "Lights On" (winter light displays)

=== Library ===
Orem's first library opened in 1939, before eventually relocating. The new Orem Public Library was built on the same lot as city hall, adjacent to City Center Park, under Mayor Winston Crawford's tenure in 1971. The library features stained glass art depicting several fairy tales at a window near the children's storytelling wing, the piece was created by artist Tom Holdman at the beginning of his career. Library Hall is an events space used for author visits, film screenings, and other programs, and includes an art gallery in the dōTERRA South Lobby.

== Sports ==
Orem has been home to a number of professional sports teams in addition to being the home to Utah Valley University's Wolverines athletic teams. The Orem Owlz minor league baseball team, a rookie league affiliate of the Los Angeles Angels, began play in 2005. The Owlz won 5 championships and had more than 90 major league players as part of the team. The Owlz played their home games at UCCU Ballpark on the campus of Utah Valley University. The stadium has a capacity of 5,000 spectators. The Owlz competed in the Pioneer League against teams from Colorado, Idaho, Montana and one team in Utah: the Ogden Raptors. They relocated to Windsor, Colorado, in 2021 and became the Northern Colorado Owlz.

Orem has also been the home to two indoor football teams as well as a G League professional basketball team. In 1998, the Utah Catzz played their only season in the Professional Indoor Football League as the league only lasted one season. The Utah Flash was an NBA G League affiliate of the Philadelphia 76ers that was established in 2007.

Club	Sport	League	Venue	Established	Concluded	Championships	Notes
Orem Owlz	Baseball	Pioneer League, Baseball	UCCU Ballpark	2005	2020	5	The Pioneer League 2020 season was canceled due to the COVID-19 pandemic.
Utah Catzz	Football	Professional Indoor Football League	UCCU Center	1998	1998	0	The Professional Indoor Football League only operated for one year during the 1998 season.
Utah Flash	Basketball	NBA G League	UCCU Center	2007	2011	0	The Utah Flash was later moved and is now known as the Delaware Blue Coats.
Utah Valley Thunder	Football	American Indoor Football Association	UCCU Center	2009	2009	0	The Utah Valley Thunder returned to the Arena Football League until 2013.

== Parks and recreation ==
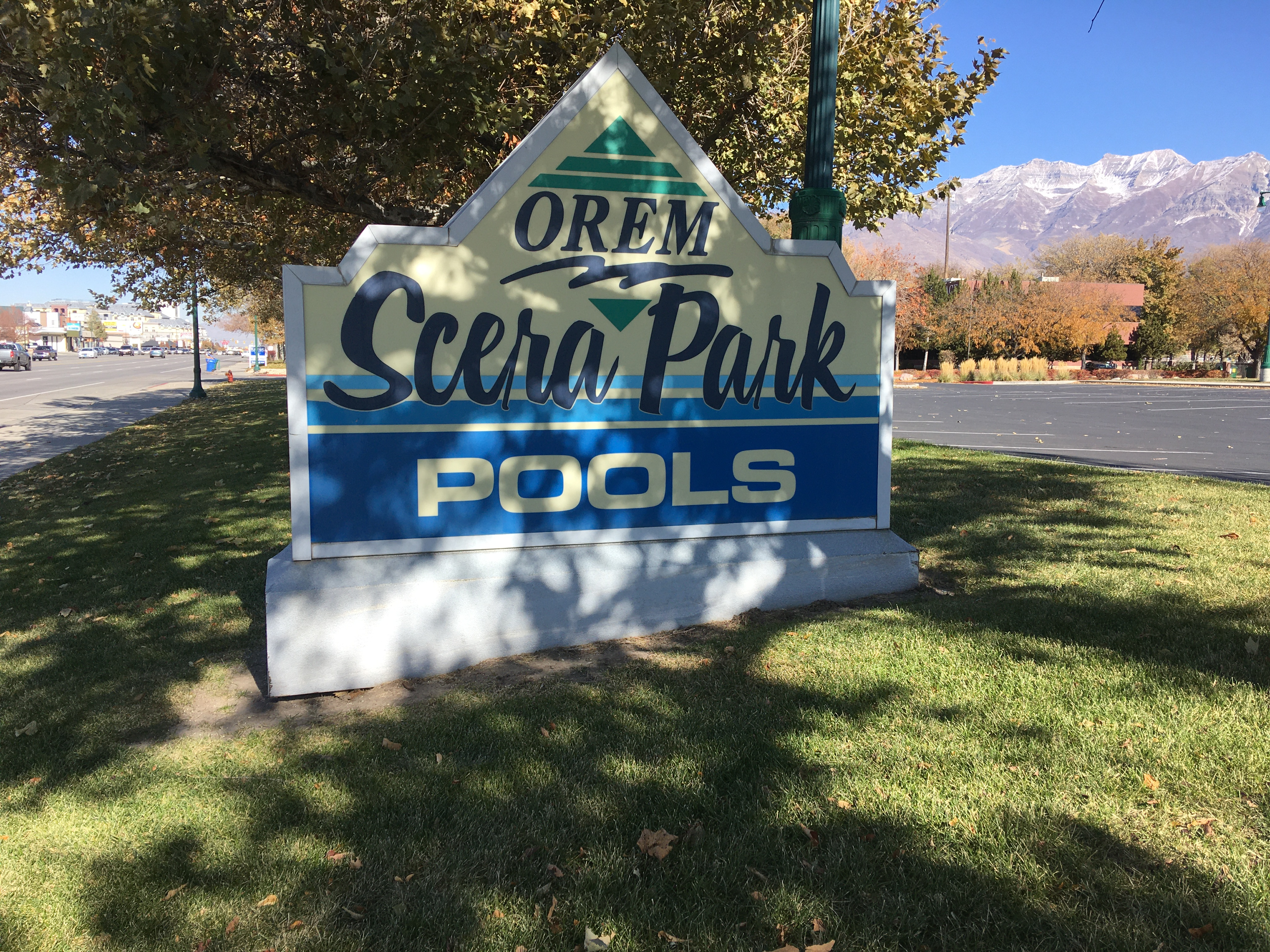
Scera Park

Orem has more than 20 parks throughout the city. In 2017, the Orem Splash Pad opened at Palisade Park. The Splash Pad uses 1,000 US gallons (830 imp gal; 3,800 L) per minute and has a weave spray nozzle as well as 22 other spray nozzles. The Skate Park opened in 2002 and has 0.25 acres (1,000 m^{2}) of cemented space for extreme sport use. City Center Park is home to the annual Orem Summerfest as well as concerts and other cultural events.

== Government ==
Orem has a council–manager government. The mayor and council members are elected and serve part-time, while the city manager is appointed and serves full-time. Six city council members serve alongside the mayor. The mayor and city council are elected to staggered four-year terms. The Orem City Center Complex on State Street housed city staffer offices from 1969 until 2025, when a new city hall was built. The old city hall was 3D scanned before it was demolished.

List of mayors of Orem (years served):

- J. Lawrence Snow (1919–1925)
- J.W. Gillman (1925–1931)
- Ivan J. Burr (1932–1935)
- Emery McKellip (1936–1937), died in 1952
- B. M. Jolley (1938–1945)
- J. W. Gillman (1946–1953), served twice non-consecutively
- Ray E. Loveless (1953)
- Leland Jarman (1954–1957)
- Luzell Robbins (1958)
- V. Emil Hansen (1958–1959)
- Melbourne D. Wallace (1960–1961)
- G. Milton Jameson (1962–1965)
- James E. Mangum (1966–1967)
- Winston M. Crawford (1968–1973), also served on Chamber of Commerce and the city council, died April 10, of coronary complications at Utah Valley Regional Medical Center.
- James E. Mangum (1974–1981)
- Delance W. Squire (1982–1985)
- S. Blaine Willes (1986–1991)
- Joyce Johnson (1991)
- Stella Welsh (1992–1997), first elected female mayor of Orem
- Joseph Nelson (died in office) (1998–1999)
- Chris Yandow (1999–1999)
- Jerry C. Washburn (2000–2011)
- James T. Evans (2011–2014)
- Richard F. Brunst, Jr. (2014–2021)
- David A. Young (2022–2025)
- Karen McCandless (2026— )

== Education ==
Orem is in the Alpine School District and as of 2010 was home to three high schools, three junior high schools, and 14 elementary schools. Following a successful voter referendum, Alpine School District is scheduled to split in 2027 into three districts, after which Orem will be included in the newly-formed Timpanogos School District.

An education center of Utah State University is also in Orem.

=== Utah Valley University ===
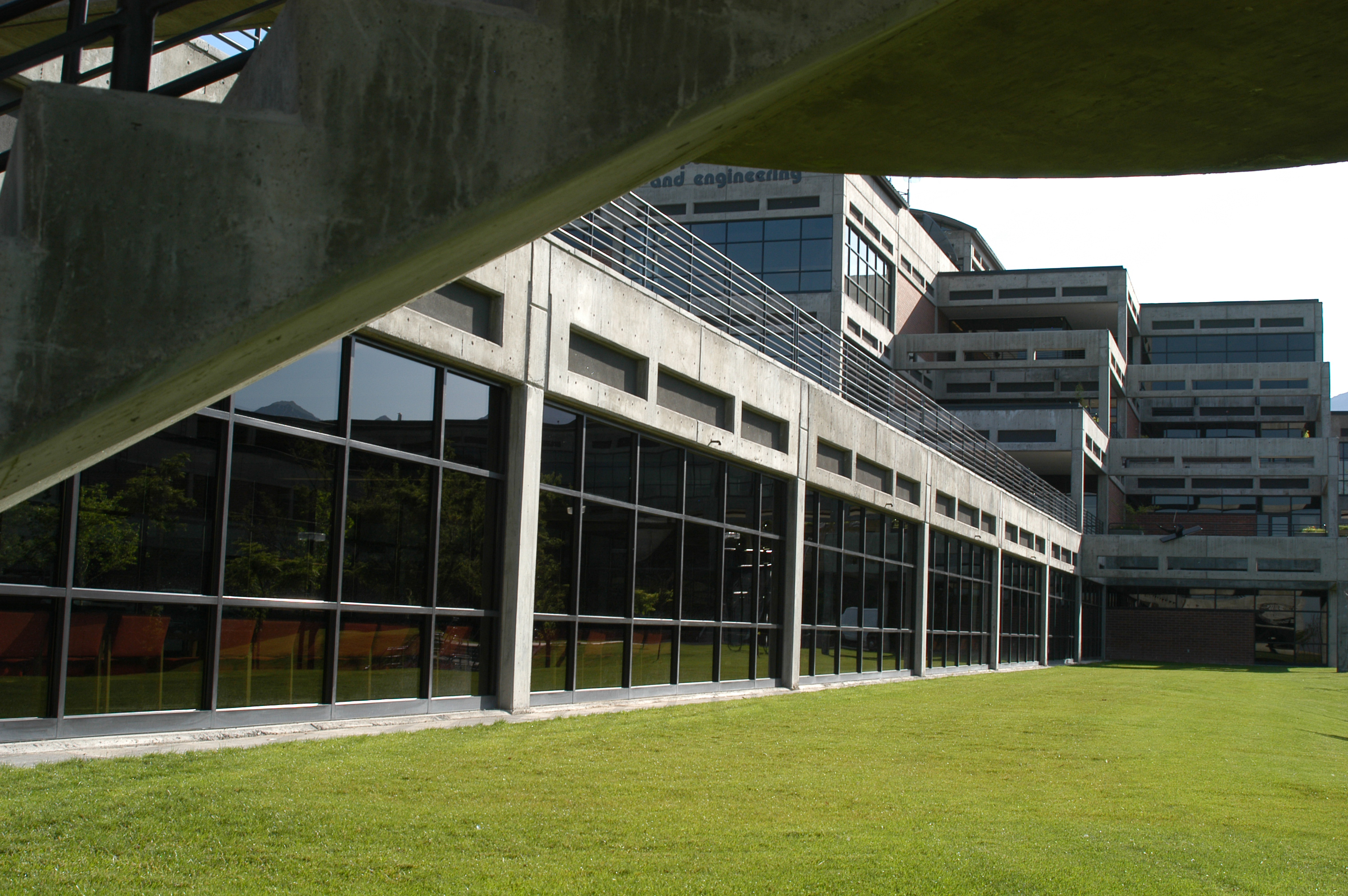
Utah Valley University campus

The primary campus of Utah Valley University (UVU) is located in Orem.

UVU is a public university operated by the state of Utah. UVU is one of the United States' only Open Enrollment Universities, accepting all applicants who meet basic criteria or test scores. UVU offers a wide variety of bachelor's and master's degrees along with many professional certification programs. It is Utah's largest and fastest-growing public university, with over 43,000 undergraduates as of late 2022. The campus's notable features include the UCCU Center, the Digital Learning Center library, the Hal Wing Track and Field Complex, and the Woodbury School of Business. The Roots of Knowledge stained glass display is in the Fulton Library on campus.

== Infrastructure ==
=== Transportation ===
==== Public transit ====
Several modes of transportation are available in Orem. The Utah Transit Authority operates the Frontrunner train, Utah Valley Express (UVX) bus rapid transit and regular bus service in the city. The Orem station serves Utah Transit Authority's FrontRunner train. The UVX route runs from Orem Central Station through UVU and along University Parkway through Orem's uptown near its southern boundary with Provo, which is where the opposite end of the bus line is located.

==== Major highways ====
The road system includes an Interstate highway, US highways, state highways, and city-maintained roads. Interstate 15 runs through the west side of Orem with four interchanges in the city. US Highway 89 (State Street) runs northwest–southeast through the middle of the city, while US Highway 189 (University Avenue) passes through a short section of northeast Orem. There are also four state routes that pass through the city – SR-52 (800 North/Canyon Parkway), SR-114 (Geneva Road), SR-241 (1600 North), and SR-265 (University Parkway).

== Notable people ==
- Alan Ashton – owns land of Thanksgiving Point and is co-founder of WordPerfect
- Beth Brower – novelist
- Ben Cahoon – receiver for the Montreal Alouettes
- William Campbell – California state legislator
- James C. Christensen – fantasy, religious and surrealism artist
- Ally Condie – New York Times bestselling author of the Matched series
- LaVell Edwards – BYU football coach
- Travis Hansen – former guard for Atlanta Hawks; co-founder of Eddy
- Brett Helquist- illustrator of A Series of Unfortunate Events
- Gary Herbert – former Governor of the State of Utah
- Chelsie Hightower – Professional ballroom dancer on Dancing with the Stars
- Tom Holdman – stained glass artist and studio owner
- Allison Holker – So You Think You Can Dance season 2 finalist
- Julianne Hough – actress, professional ballroom dancer on Dancing with the Stars, and singer, born in Orem
- John S. K. Kauwe III – Biologist and president of Brigham Young University–Hawaii
- Paul Kruger – NFL linebacker for the Cleveland Browns
- Chad Lewis – NFL tight end
- Bert McCracken – lead vocals of the rock band The Used, was born in Provo but grew up in Orem
- Puka Nacua – NFL wide receiver for the Los Angeles Rams
- Rome Odunze – NFL wide receiver for the Chicago Bears was born in Orem
- Donny Osmond – American actor and singer
- Marie Osmond – American actress and singer
- Noelle Pikus-Pace – 2005 overall World Cup Skeleton title winner and silver medalist at 2014 Sochi Winter Olympics
- Shauna Rohbock – silver medalist in women's bobsleigh at the Turin 2006 Olympics
- Thomas Sederberg – Creator of the T-spline
- Marlon O. Snow – member of the Utah House of Representatives
- Howard Tayler – author of Schlock Mercenary
- Erin Thorn – WNBA guard
- Dan Wells – author of the I Am Not a Serial Killer and Partials Sequence
- Charlie Kirk (Died here) – Conservative political activist and founder of Turning Point USA,

Notable groups include:

- Rock band The Used

== Sister cities ==
Orem has one sister city in Ürümqi, China, according to the Utah League of Cities and Towns and the Utah Sister Cities Coalition.

== See also ==
- Christeele Acres Historic District
- Cirque Lodge
- List of cities and towns in Utah
