= Hobble Creek =

Hobble Creek may refer to a location in the U.S. state of Utah:

- Hobble Creek (Utah County, Utah), a tributary of Utah Lake
- Hobble Creek, Utah, a census-designated place named for the creek
- Hobble Creek, original name of Springville, Utah

== See also ==
- Hubble Creek (disambiguation)
