= Lakeview Parkway (Utah County, Utah) =

Connector street in Utah County, Utah, United States

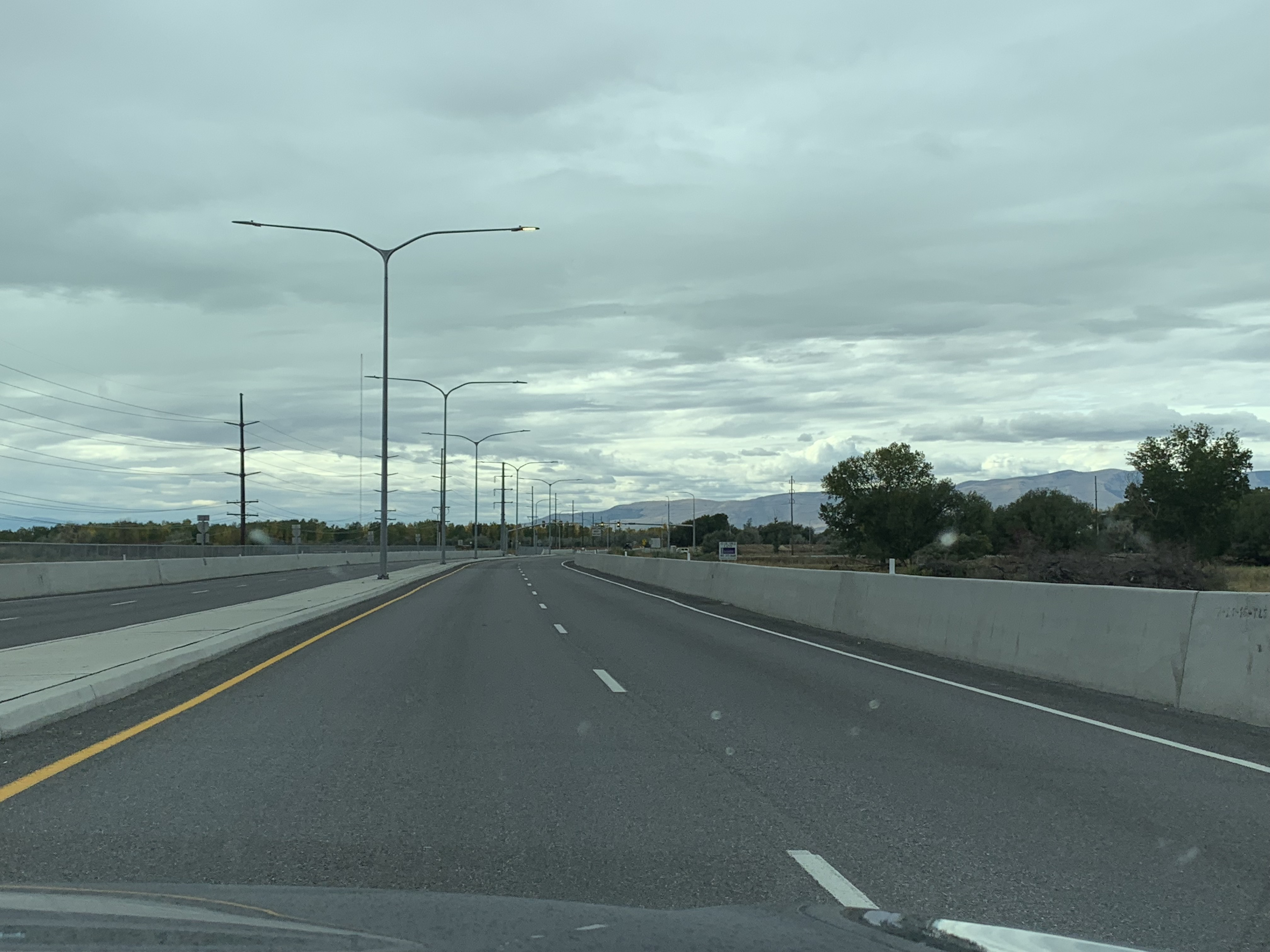
- Looking west along westbound Lakeview Parkway from just west of Interstate 15, October 2018
- Former name(s): West Side Connector
- Namesake: Lakeview
- Owner: Provo City and Utah County
- Maintained by: Provo City and Utah County
- Length: 8.1 mi (13.0 km)
- Location: Utah County, Utah; United States
- West end: West 2000 North on Provo-Orem line
- Major junctions: I-15 / US 189 in Provo
- East end: US 89 (South State Street) in Provo

Construction
- Completion: October 2016 (initial section)

Other
- Known for: Access to the Provo Municipal Airport and views of Utah Lake

Lakeview Parkway is a yet-to-be-entirely-completed connector street (currently about 8.1 miles [13.0 km] long) in Utah County, Utah, United States, that is almost entirely located within the city limits of Provo and runs along length of the south and west sides of the city. The parkway serves the Provo Municipal Airport and the new campus of Provo High School. Upon final completion, it will be a four to five-lane road running from Geneva Road (State Route 114 [SR-114]) at in southern Orem to South State Street (U.S. Route 89 [US 89]).

== Route description ==
As of August 2025, Lakeview Parkway begins at an intersection with the west end of West 2000 North on the border of Provo and Orem cities. (West 2000 North heads east to cross Geneva Road (SR-114) before passing under Interstate 15 [I-15] and enter Orem to become West 2000 North. The unbuilt westernmost end of the road will continue north from the future T-intersection.)

From its western terminus, with wetlands of Utah Lake to the west, Lakeview Parkway proceeds south in Provo as a two lane road on a gradual curve to the west, then back to the east, and then to the south before reaching the west end of 1390 North at a T-intersection. (West 1390 North heads easterly toward Geneva Road [SR-114].) Lakeview Parkway continues south-southeast for another block before reaching the west end of West 1280 North at another T-intersection on the northwest corner of the new campus of Provo High School, which was opened in 2019. (West 1280 North heads east along the north side of the high school campus to Lakeshore Drive.) From West 1280 North Lakeview Parkway proceeds south-southeast along the west side of the high school campus (passing the school's baseball field, tennis courts, and football field) to connect with the west end of Bulldog Drive (which heads northeasterly on the south edge of the high school campus to connect with Lakeshore Drive). Upon passing Bulldog Drive, the street leaves the limits of Provo and enters an unincorporated area of Utah County known as Lakeview, the namesake of the parkway.

South of Bulldog Drive, Lakeview Parkway briefly continues south–southeast before curving to continue south to connect with the west end of West 620 South. (That street heads east to cross Lakeshore Drive and eventually ends at Geneva Road [SR-114].) Lakeview Parkway then widens to a four-lane divided road and continues as such for the remainder of its course. Next on the route is a bridge over the newly constructed channel for the Provo River Delta, immediately followed by a connection with the east end of the western section of North Boat Harbor Drive, which heads west toward Utah Lake State Park. (Prior to the creation of the Provo River Delta, North Boat Harbor Drive passed east–west west through the area, about 300 feet [91 m] north of the current intersection. However, the road was re-aligned and the section east of Lakeview Parkway was eliminated to make way for the Provo River Delta, leaving the eastern section of North Boat Harbor Drive as a dead end street heading west off of Lakeshore Drive.) Next Lakeview Parkway has a bridge over the Provo River Parkway and the Provo River before re-entering Provo and crossing West Center Street. (West Center Street heads west to Utah Lake State Park and east to Lakeshore Drive, Geneva Road [SR-114], I 15, US-89, and downtown Provo.)

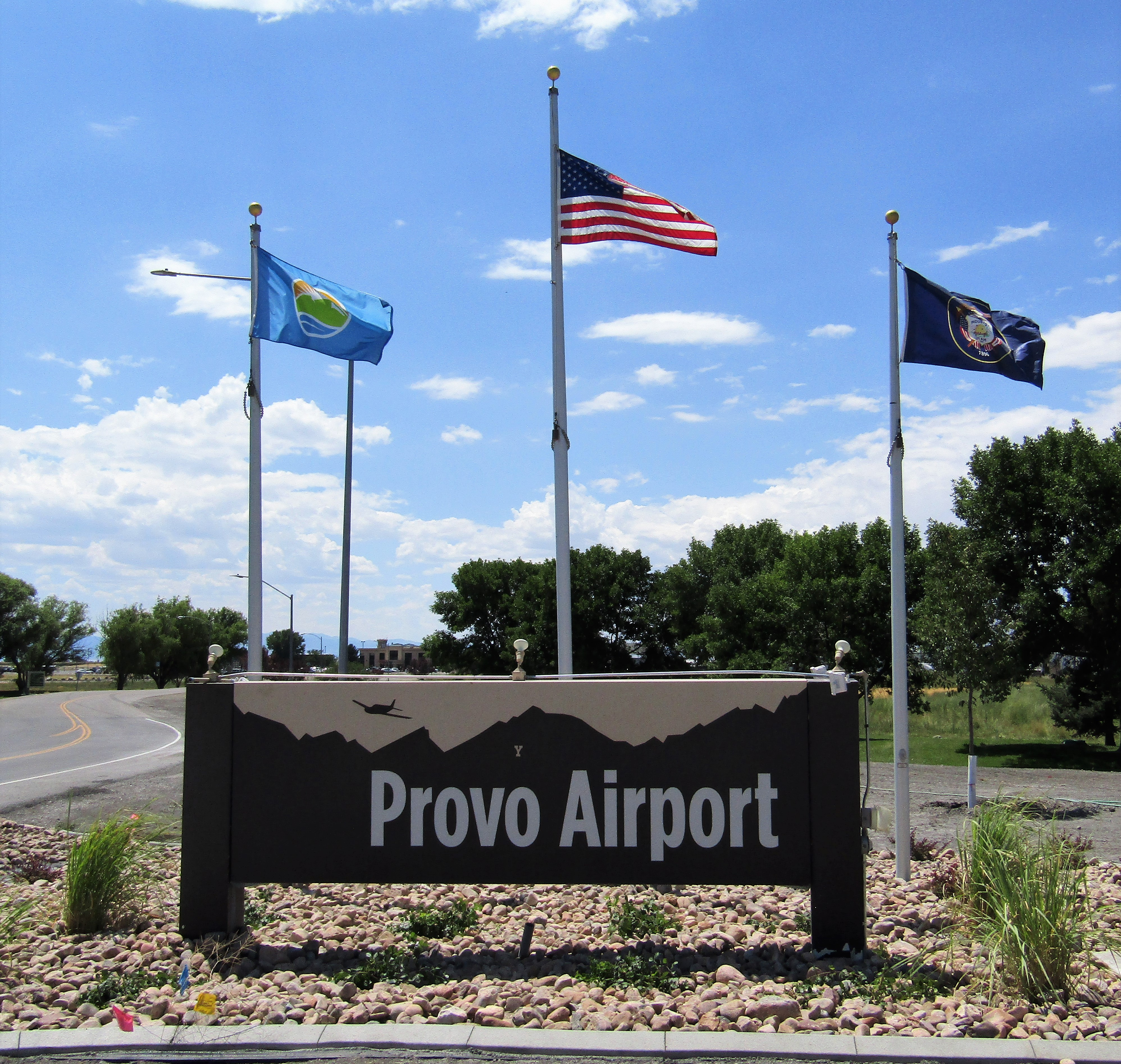
Provo Airport sign along Lakeview Parkway, July 2017

From West Center Street, Lakeview Parkway continues south, but quickly curves to the southeast and promptly connects with the south end of Lakeshore Drive, which heads north (paralleling Lakeview Parkway) to Provo High School. Lakeview Parkway then curves to the south to follow the alignment of what was formerly designated as South 3110 West, connecting with the west end of West 280 South (a gravel road) along the way. Continuing south Lakeview Parkway connects with the east ends of West 550 South and West 810 South before reaching the east end of Mike Jense Parkway, which briefly heads west–southwest before arriving at the general aviation area of the Provo Municipal Airport. (Prior to the construction of Lakeview Parkway, South 3110 West headed south to seamlessly curve into Mike Jense Parkway, but now that road has a T intersection with Lakeview Parkway.)

From Mike Jense Parkway, Lakeview Parkway continues south to quickly connect with the west end of Sky Way, which provides access to Provo Airport passenger terminal. (Sky Way is almost entirely a one-way eastbound road that forms a western loop off of Lakeview Parkway. Initially it heads westerly, but promptly turns to head southeast to pass between the passenger terminal on the west and the airport passenger parking lot on the east. (Note: On the south side of the passenger terminal of the Provo Municipal Airport is a bus stop for regular Utah Transit Authority (UTA) bus service (which connects the Provo Central station with the airport via West Center Street). However, included in the bus stop is an elevated passenger platform that is intended for future use by the Utah Valley Express (UVX), a bus-rapid transit line of UTA which runs between the Provo Central station and the Orem Central station, with a one-way loop through East Bay. Currently, UTA has no buses in its fleet, other than the ones used for UVX, that can access an elevated passenger platform. When UVX service is extended to the airport, it will run along Lakeview Parkway, rather than West Center Street.) At the south end of the parking lot, Sky Way turns northeast then east to gain its westbound lane before curving north to reconnect with Lakeview Parkway.) (Note: While westbound Sky Way (at South 2770 West) initially heads south as a two lane road, westbound traffic is currently and abruptly directed to, and ends at, an open field and does not continue to the airport, nor does it allow access to the passenger terminal or parking lot.) From its connection with the west end of Sky Way, Lakeview Parkway begins a gradual curve to head northeast. At the bottom of the curve, Lakeview Parkway connects with the east end of Sky Way and south end of South 2770 West.

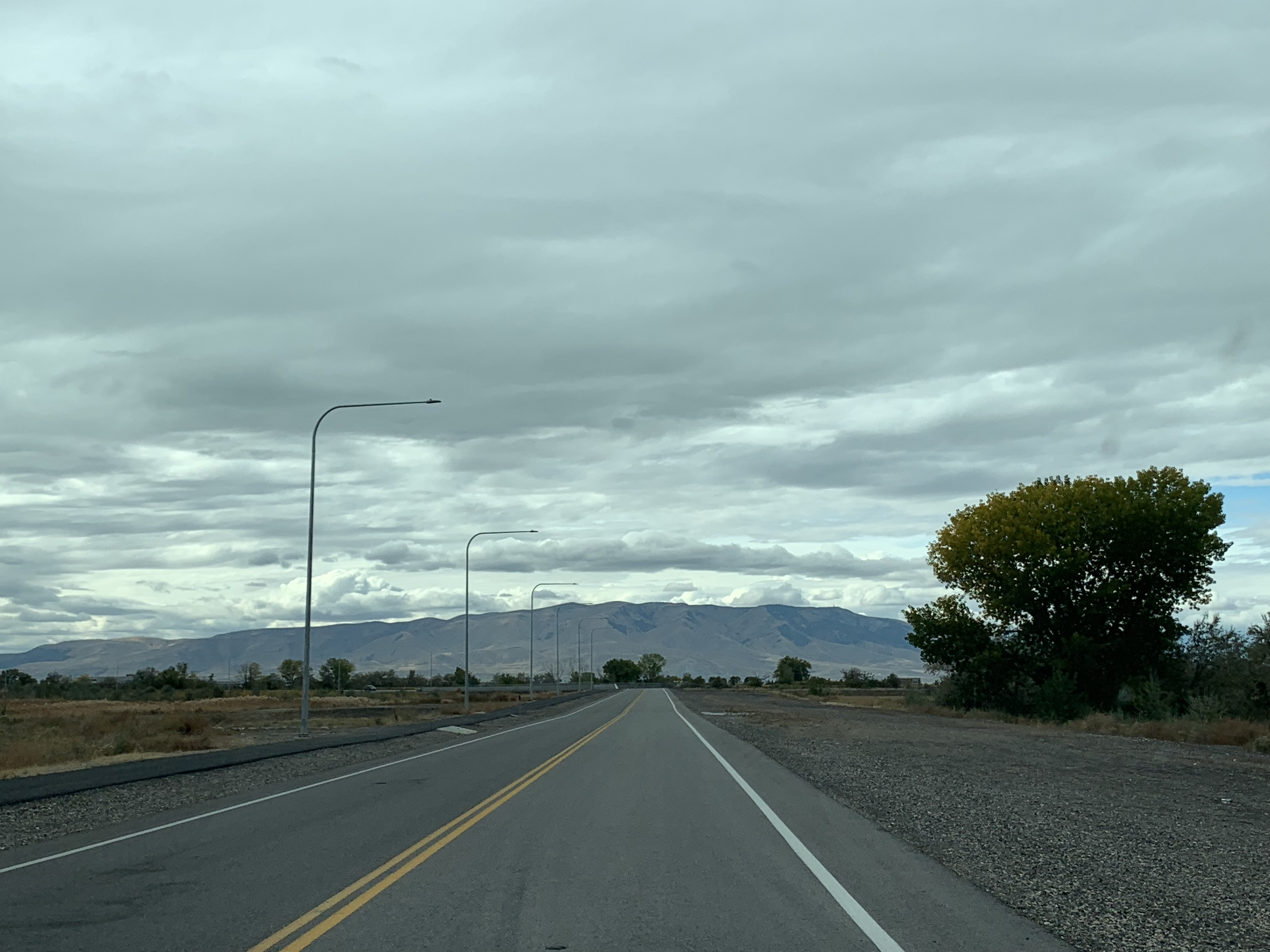
View west along Lakeview Parkway from about 2100 West, with Lake Mountains in the distance, October 2018. Note the graded area on the right (north) for the future lanes (which have since been completed).

After very briefly proceeding northeast, Lakeview Parkway turns to head east–southeasterly and connects with the south end of South 2050 West (which heads north to cross West Center Street and become Geneva Road [SR-114]). Lakeview Parkway continues southeasterly to connect with the south end of South 1600 West (which also heads north to cross West Center Street) and then connect with the south end of South 1100 West (which heads north to end at West 600 South). Lakeview Parkway then passes by the southern edge of a newly constructed residential area, turns east, and connects with the south end of South 500 West. (South 500 West heads north to connect with US 89 [at West 300 South] and West Center Street [SR-114].) Lakeview Parkway then continues easterly to the I-15 interchange. (Between the east end of Sky Way and I-15, Lakeview Parkway runs just north of more wetlands of the Provo Bay of Utah Lake.)

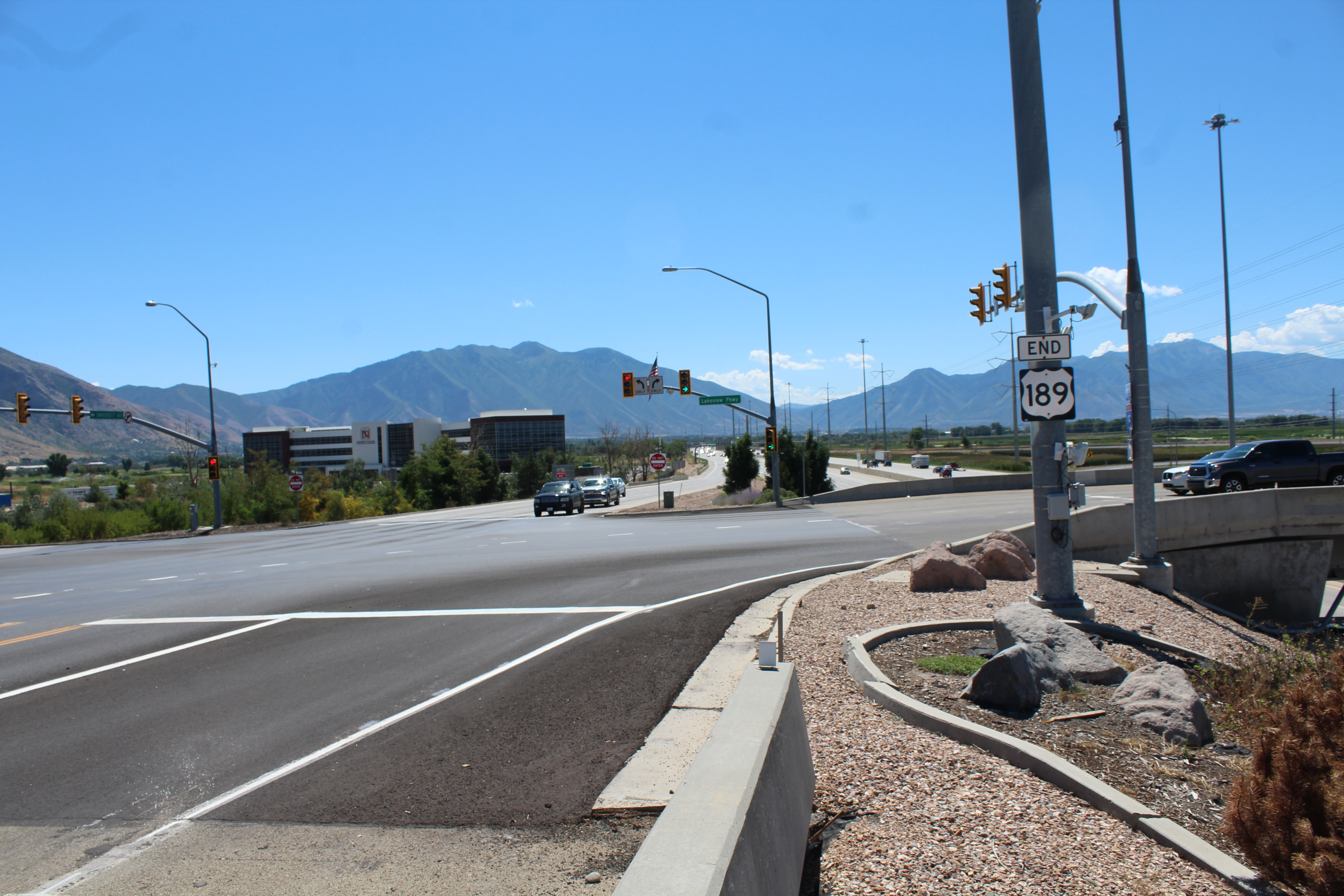
View south from the south end of South University Avenue (US 189) toward the northbound Interstate 15 off ramp, August 2023

Within the I-15 interchange, Lakeview Parkway first crosses the southbound on ramp and then connects with the southbound on/off ramp. It then crosses the northbound off ramp, which is also the south end of South University Avenue (U.S. Route 189 [US 189]). Finally, Lakeview Parkway connects with the northbound on ramp for westbound traffic on the Lakeview Parkway. (Eastbound traffic on Lakeview Parkway must turn north [left] on to South University Avenue [US 189] to access the northbound on ramp to I-15.)

Beyond the I-15 interchange, Lakeview Parkway continues east (along the road formerly designated as East 1860 South) to connect with Novell Place / South 180 East. (Novell Place heads north toward Micro Focus and Rocky Mountain University of Health Professions. South 180 East heads south to become South East Bay Boulevard, which loops east to cross Lakeview Parkway.) Immediately after the intersection, on the north side of the road is the East Bay South station of Utah Transit Authority's (UTA) Utah Valley Express bus-rapid transit (which only runs westbound in the area). Lakeview Parkway the crosses South East Bay Boulevard (which heads north, the west to connect with South University Avenue [US 189] and heads south to loop west to connect back with Lakeview Parkway). Continuing east, Lakeview Parkway crosses South 700 East (South Industrial Parkway) on the southwest corner of what was formerly the Provo landfill. (South 700 East heads south to promptly turn east to become East 1900 South and then continue south toward Springville.)

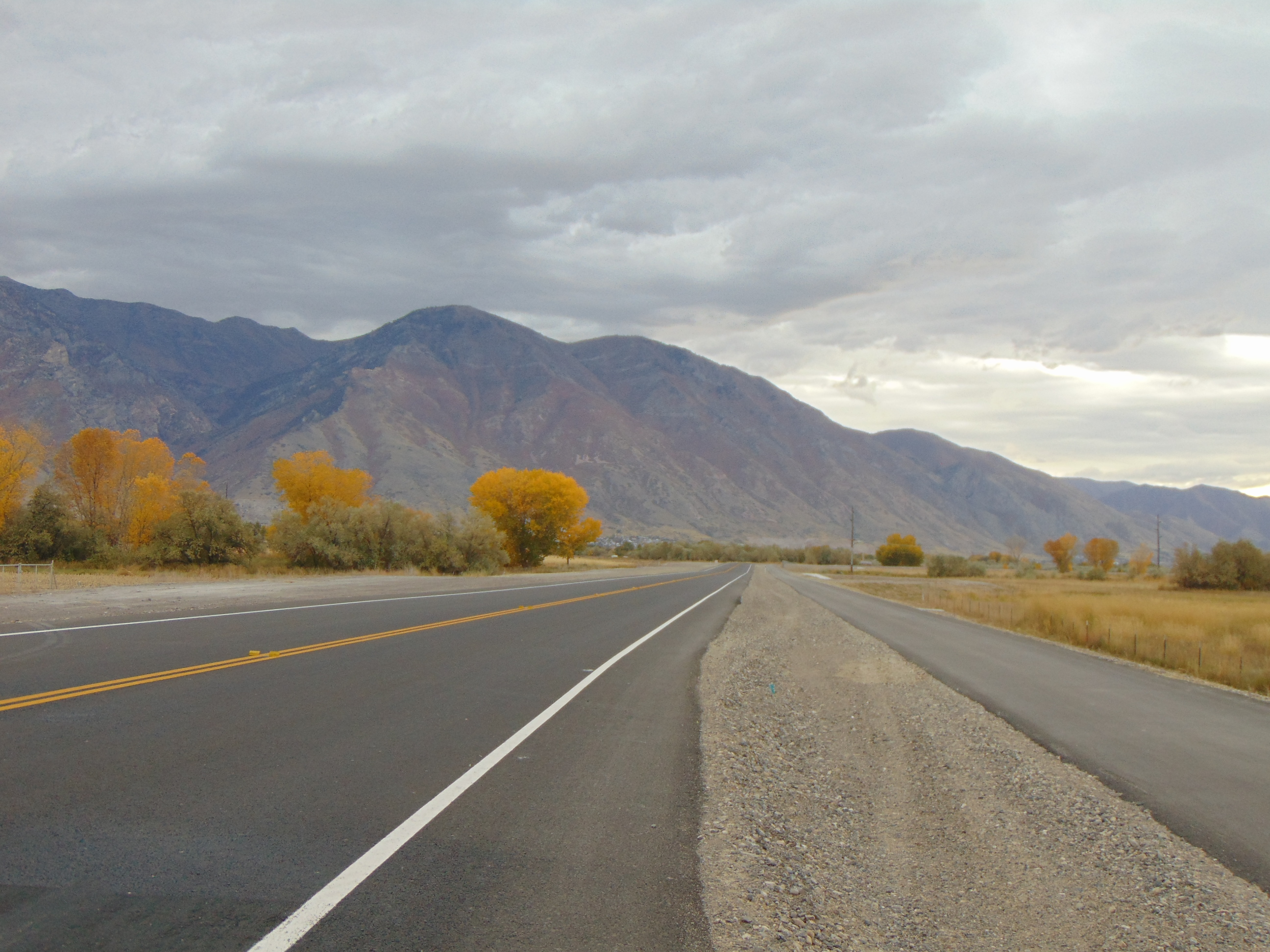
View southeast along Lakeview Parkway at about 2420 West, with the Lakeview Parkway Trail on the right, October 2016

East of South 700 East, Lakeview Parkway curves slightly to the north and has a bridge over five sets of railroad tracks owned by the Union Pacific Railroad (UP), and the future corridor for UTA's FrontRunner commuter rail when it is extended south to Payson. East of the bridge, Lakeview Parkway curves to the east-southeast and connects with south end of Colorado Avenue. Continuing south–southeast Lakeview Parkway has another bridge over two more sets of UP tracks before curving to the northeast and reaching its eastern terminus at an intersection with South State Street (US 89). The roadway continues (as Slate Canyon Drive) to the northeast before heading northerly to connect with the east end of East 300 South. South State Street heads north–northwest to end at an intersection with East 300 South and the south end of South 700 East. State Street heads southerly to pass through Springville and Mapleton before reaching a junction with U.S. Route 6 at Moark Junction.

Running along the south side of the parkway, from the Provo Airport to the I-15 interchange, is the 3.7-mile (6.0 km) Lakeview Parkway Trail. Although the trail is multi-use, it is often referred to as a bikeway.

== History ==
Original construction of Lakeview Parkway only had it running west from the intersection of Mike Jense Parkway and South 3110 West to the I-15 interchange. As construction began, (with groundbreaking on May 8, 2014) only the section of the current parkway north of West Center Street was referred to as Lakeview Parkway. The section south of West Center Street and west of I-15 was referred to as the West Side Connector. However, by the time the initial section of what had been referred to as the West Side Connector was opened for traffic on October 13, 2016, it was also signed as Lakeview Parkway. (The east end of the current parkway, east of I-15 [formerly East 1860 South], had been constructed with 4–5 lanes about 20 years prior and was not considered part of the project.) While this initial section was graded for four lanes, only the two eastbound were paved from South 3110 West to just west of the intersection with South 500 West. East of that point, the parkway was a 4-lane divided highway through the I-15 interchange. Several years after initial construction, a traffic signal was installed at the intersection with South 500 West. In preparation for the construction of the new campus of Provo High School the section between West 620 North and West 1280 North was graded and the northbound two lanes were paved.

The year following the opening of the initial section, the $39 million project (equivalent to $51 million in 2024) was named Project of the Year by the Utah Chapter of the American Public Works Association.

By late 2019 the north end of South 3110 (which previously connected with the south end of Lakeshore Drive) was shifted west to the currently alignment of Lakeview Parkway. The south end of previous northernmost segment of South 3100 West was adjusted to form a T intersection with Lakeview Parkway and was designated as the southern end of Lakeshore Drive. The remaining section of South 3110 West (south to Mike Jense Parkway) was designated as Lakeview Parkway. About the same time, the length of the road previously signed as East 1860 South (between the I-15 interchange and South State Street [US 89]) was also designated part of Lakeview Parkway and signage was replaced to reflect this change. During the summer of 2025, the west end of Lakeview Parkway was extended northerly to end (temporarily) at West 2000 North (on the border of Provo and Orem cities).

== Future ==
The west end of Lakeview Parkway will eventually be extended north to likely connect with Geneva Road (SR-114) in Orem. When the northern end is completed, the entire length of Lakeview Parkway will be widened to 4-5 lanes.

== Major intersections ==
The entire route is in Utah County.

Location	mi	km	Destinations	Notes
Orem–Provo line	0.0	0.0	Lakeview Parkway north	Unbuilt continuation north into Orem; will be a T intersection
Orem–Provo line	0.0	0.0	West 2000 North east – SR-114 (Geneva Road), Orem	Temporary western terminus; T intersection
Provo	0.7	1.1	West 1390 North east – SR-114 (Geneva Road), Lakeshore Drive	T intersection
Provo	0.8	1.3	West 1280 North east – Provo High School, Lakeshore Drive	T intersection
Provo	1.1	1.8	Bulldog Drive east – Provo High School, Lakeshore Drive	T intersection
Lakeview	1.5	2.4	West 620 North east – Lakeshore Drive, North Geneva Road (SR-114)	T intersection
Lakeview	1.7	2.7	Bridge over the Provo River Delta	
Lakeview	1.7	2.7	North Boat Harbor Drive west – Utah Lake State Park	T intersection
Lakeview	1.8	2.9	Bridge over the Provo River Parkway and the Provo River	
Provo	2.1	3.4	West Center Street east – Lakeshore Drive, North Geneva Road (SR-114), I-15, South 500 West (US 89), Downtown Provo; West Center Street west – Utah Lake State Park	
Provo	2.3	3.7	Lakeshore Drive north – West Center Street, Provo High School	T intersection
Provo	2.6	4.2	West 550 South west	T intersection
Provo	2.8	4.5	West 810 South west	T intersection
Provo	3.0	4.8	Mike Jense Parkway west – Provo Municipal Airport (general aviation)	T intersection
Provo	2.5	4.0	Sky Way east – Provo Municipal Airport (commercial passenger teriminal)	T intersection:eastbound Sky Way heads west as a one-way road
Provo	3.6	5.8	South 2770 West north Sky Way west	No airport access
Provo	4.4	7.1	South 2050 West north – SR-114 (West Center Street), SR-114 (North Geneve Road)	T intersection
Provo	4.19	6.74	South 1600 West north – SR-114 (West Center Street)	T intersection
Provo	5.4	8.7	South 1100 West north	T intersection
Provo	6.1	9.8	South 500 West north – US 89, West Center Street (SR-114)	T intersection
Provo	6.4– 6.6	10.3– 10.6	I-15 north (Veterans Memorial Highway) – Salt Lake City I-15 south (Veterans Memorial Highway) – Las Vegas (Nevada) US 189 north (South University Avenue) – Provo Central station and Provo station, US 89, Downtown Provo, Brigham Young University, Heber City	Interchange with I-15, but not US 189
Provo	6.7	10.8	South Novell Place north – Micro Focus and Rocky Mountain University of Health Professions; South 180 East south – Lakeview Parkway	The Utah Valley Express East Bay South station is located on north side of Lakeview Parkway, immediately east of Novell Place
Provo	6.9	11.1	South East Bay Boulevard north – US 189; South East Bay Boulevard south – Lakeview Parkway	
Provo	7.2	11.6	South 700 East (South Industrial Parkway) north South 700 East (South Industrial Parkway) south – Springville	
Provo	7.4– 7.5	11.9– 12.1	Bridge over the Union Pacific Railroad tracks and future FrontRunner tracks	
Provo	7.7	12.4	Colorado Avenue north	T intersection
Provo	7.1– 8.0	11.4– 12.9	Bridge over the Union Pacific Railroad tracks	
Provo	8.1	13.0	SR-89 north (South State Street) – Downtown Provo, Orem SR-89 south (South State Street) – Springville, Mapleton, US-6	Eastern terminus
Provo	8.1	13.0	South Slate Canyon Road east	Continuation east from eastern terminus; heads east, then north to the east end of East 300 South
1.000 mi = 1.609 km; 1.000 km = 0.621 mi: Unopened

== External references ==
Media related to Lakeview Parkway (Utah County, Utah) at Wikimedia Commons
