= Lakeview, Utah County, Utah =

Unincorporated community in Utah County, Utah, United States

Lakeview
- Unincorporated community
- Location of Lakeview within the State of Utah
- Coordinates: 40°15′29″N 111°42′45″W
- Country: United States
- State: Utah
- County: Utah
- Named after: View of Utah Lake
- Elevation: 4,534 ft (1,382 m)
- Time zone: UTC-5 (Mountain (MST))
  - Summer (DST): UTC-4 (MDT)
- ZIP code: 84058, 84601, 84604
- Area codes: 801 & 385
- GNIS feature ID: 1442425

Lakeview (also known as Lake View) is an unincorporated community on the east shore of Utah Lake in central Utah County, Utah, United States.

== Description ==
Lakeview is located on the northwestern side of the city of Provo and the southwest side of the city of Orem. that has mostly been annexed into either Orem or Provo.

There is a neighborhood in the southwestern edge of Orem that is called Lakeview (which is roughly bounded by Geneva Road (State Route 114), University Parkway (State Route 265), South Main Street, and the Provo–Orem border). In northwestern Provo, south of the neighborhood of Lakeview in Orem, is a neighborhood called Lakeview North (which is roughly bounded by the Provo–Orem border, Interstate 15 [I‑15], West 820 North, and [what would be about] North 3000 West). South of Lakeview North is a third neighborhood called Lake View South (which is roughly bounded by West 820 North, I‑15, the Provo River, and [what would be about] North 3000 West. Lakeview Parkway (which was named after the community) passes to the west of both Lakeview North and Lake View South, but does not enter either neighborhood.

The new campus of Provo High School was built in Lakeview.
