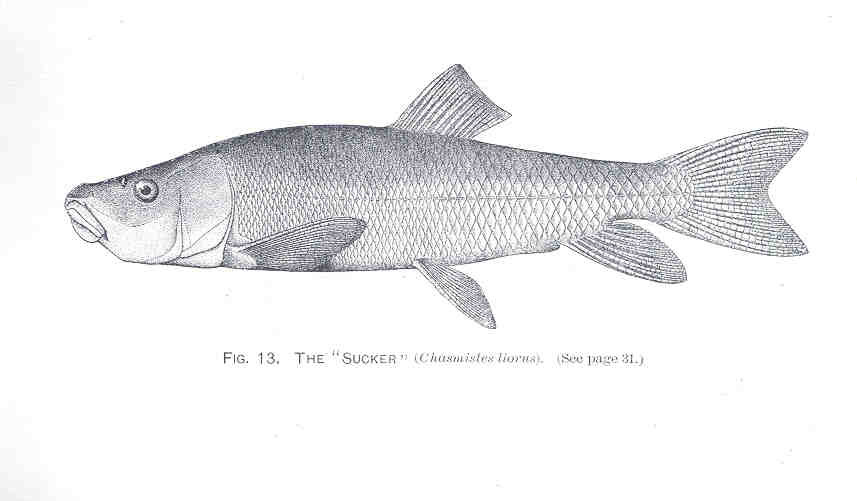

Conservation status
- Critically Endangered (IUCN 3.1)

- Threatened (ESA)

Scientific classification
- Kingdom: Animalia
- Phylum: Chordata
- Class: Actinopterygii
- Order: Cypriniformes
- Family: Catostomidae
- Genus: Chasmistes
- Species: C. liorus

Binomial name
- Chasmistes liorus D. S. Jordan, 1878

Subspecies
- see text

= June sucker =

Species of fish

The June sucker (Chasmistes liorus) is an endangered species of fish endemic to Utah Lake and the Provo River in the U.S. state of Utah. It is named after the month in which it spawns. It is a gray or brownish fish with a paler belly, growing up to about 24 in (61 cm). It lives alongside the Utah sucker, which has a much wider range. Due to the populations of both fish becoming greatly reduced in the lake as a result of fishing, other species such as the common carp have been introduced into the lake. As a result, the June sucker has become "critically endangered" as the pure species is lost as a result of hybridization with the Utah sucker, and predatory fish feed on its larvae. Conservation measures have been put in place and fish are being raised in a fish hatchery for reintroduction.

== Description ==
It is a member of the sucker family Catostomidae, and occurs in sympatry with the demersal Utah sucker Catostomus ardens. Unlike most other suckers, the June sucker is not a bottom-feeder. Its mouth is more rostrally oriented, allowing it to collect zooplankton from the midwater. The fish is dark gray or brownish dorsally, with a white or slightly greenish belly. It has a lifespan over 40 years. Typical specimens range from 17 to 24 in (43 to 61 cm) and reach a weight of 5 lb (2.3 kg).

== Distribution ==
The June sucker is known only from Utah Lake in the United States, its feeder streams, and the adjacent Provo River.

== Subspecies ==
- †C. l. liorus. Possibly extinct as early as 1935.
- C. l. mictus The surviving form, created via hybrid speciation with Catostomus ardens.

== Status ==
This species was once plentiful in its native lake. Some contributions to its decline include predation on its young by introduced species such as the white bass and walleye, pollution and turbidity, drought, alteration of water flow, and loss of some native vegetation. It also hybridizes with the Utah sucker (Catostomus ardens) and unhybridized fish may not remain.

June sucker were stocked into Red Butte Reservoir, where a natural sustaining population has been established. Fish have also been intensively cultured at the Logan Fish Hatchery in Logan, Utah since 1991. The goal is to release 25,000 12 in (30 cm) individuals into Utah Lake from the hatchery annually. The Springville State Hatchery has also grown fish in ponds historically for population augmentation. As of Spring 2023, more than 1,000,000 June suckers have been raised and released into Utah Lake and other local waters from Logan Fish Hatchery as a protective measure against extinction.

The June Sucker Recovery Implementation Program coordinates and implements recovery actions for the June sucker.

In 2021, the federal listing of the June sucker was downgraded from endangered to threatened by the U.S. Fish & Wildlife Service. The population has rebounded from an effective population size of approximately 300 fish in 1999 to around 3,500 in 2016. The June sucker had been listed as endangered in 1986. Recovery efforts included habitat restoration to combat significant channelization, impoundment and loss of gradient in tributary streams that was preventing June sucker spawning and recruitment. Studies to determine the extent of natural recruitment were ongoing at the time of publication. The June Sucker Recovery Implementation Program will work on managing reservoir releases in the Provo River and Hobble Creek systems to facilitate the spawning and rearing of June suckers.
