= Snake River sucker =

Conservation status
- Extinct (1928) (IUCN 3.1)

- Presumed Extinct (1928) (NatureServe)

Scientific classification
- Kingdom: Animalia
- Phylum: Chordata
- Class: Actinopterygii
- Order: Cypriniformes
- Family: Catostomidae
- Genus: Chasmistes
- Species: †C. muriei

Binomial name
- †Chasmistes muriei R. R. Miller & G. R. Smith, 1981

Extinct species of fish

The Snake River sucker (Chasmistes muriei) is an extinct species of ray-finned fish in the family Catostomidae. It was endemic to the Snake River below Jackson Lake Dam in Wyoming. Described from a single specimen, it is now presumed to be an extinct species.

== See also ==
- Fish extinctions since 1500
- Fish of the Western United States
- Freshwater fish of the United States
