= Hubble Creek =

Hubble Creek may refer to:

- Hubble Creek (Castor River Diversion Channel tributary), a stream in Missouri
- Hubble Creek (St. Francis River tributary), a stream in Missouri

== See also ==
- Hobble Creek (disambiguation)
