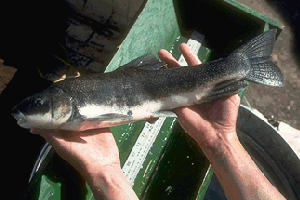
- Shortnose sucker

Scientific classification
- Domain: Eukaryota
- Kingdom: Animalia
- Phylum: Chordata
- Class: Actinopterygii
- Order: Cypriniformes
- Family: Catostomidae
- Subfamily: Catostominae
- Genus: Chasmistes; D. S. Jordan, 1878

Type species
- Catostomus fecundus Jordan, 1878

= Chasmistes =

Chasmistes Temporal range: Pliocene–present

Genus of fishes

Chasmistes is a genus of ray-finned fish in the family Catostomidae.

They are native to freshwater habitats in the Western United States.

Several species are seriously threatened, and one has become extinct in recent history (a second extinct species has only been known from fossils).

== Characteristics ==
Members of this genus have a large and stout body, as well as a large head. They often have a hump on their snout. Their mouths are either terminal or subterminal. They have a complete lateral line and a two-chambered gas bladder.

== Species ==
The genus Chasmistes contains these species:

- Chasmistes brevirostris Cope, 1879 — shortnose sucker
- Chasmistes cujus Cope, 1883 — cui-ui
- Chasmistes fecundus (Cope & Yarrow, 1875) — Webug sucker
- Chasmistes liorus D. S. Jordan, 1878 — June sucker
  - Chasmistes liorus liorus D. S. Jordan, 1878
  - Chasmistes liorus mictus R. R. Miller & G. R. Smith, 1981
- †Chasmistes muriei R. R. Miller & G. R. Smith, 1981 — Snake River sucker

Fossil species

- †Chasmistes spatulifer R. R. Miller & G. R. Smith, 1967 (from the Plio-Pleistocene of Idaho)
