= Dry Creek (Utah) =

- Location of the mouth of Dry Creek within the State of Utah Dry Creek (Utah) (the United States)

Location
- Country: United States
- State: Utah
- Counties: Utah

Physical characteristics
- Source
  - coordinates: 40.4763388°N 111.7577082°W
- Mouth: Utah Lake
  - elevation: 5,320 ft (1,620 m)
- Discharge
  - location: Utah Lake

Basin features
- River system: Utah Lake
- GNIS feature ID: 10165500

Dry Creek is a stream in northern Utah County, Utah, United States, and a northern tributary of Utah Lake.
