= Hobble Creek, Utah =

Census-designated place in Utah County, Utah, United States

- Census-designated place
- Location within Utah Location within the United States
- Coordinates: 40°13′00″N 111°29′14″W
- Country: United States
- State: Utah
- County: Utah

Area
  - Total: 2.14 sq mi (5.55 km^{2})
  - Land: 2.14 sq mi (5.55 km^{2})
  - Water: 0 sq mi (0.0 km^{2})
- Elevation: 5,768 ft (1,758 m)

Population (2020)
  - Total: 169
  - Density: 78.9/sq mi (30.5/km^{2})
- Time zone: UTC-7 (Mountain (MST))
  - Summer (DST): UTC-6 (MDT)
- ZIP Code: 84663 (Springville)
- Area codes: 801, 385
- FIPS code: 49-35823
- GNIS feature ID: 2813359

Hobble Creek is a census-designated place (CDP) in eastern Utah County, Utah, United States. It was first listed as a CDP prior to the 2020 census when it had a population of 169.

== Description ==
The CDP is located within the Wasatch Range in the valley of Hobble Creek, a west-flowing tributary of Utah Lake, and its Left Fork, which flows from north to south. The entire CDP is within the Uinta National Forest. The CDP extends from the Hobble Creek Golf Course, about 1 mile (1.6 km) east of the city limits of Springville, upstream along Hobble Creek and then northwards up the Left Fork as far as Berryport Canyon.

== See also ==
- List of census-designated places in Utah
