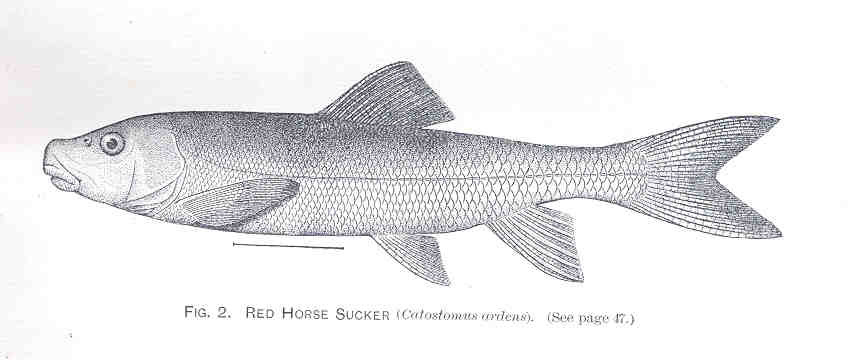

Conservation status
- Least Concern (IUCN 3.1)

- Secure (NatureServe)

Scientific classification
- Kingdom: Animalia
- Phylum: Chordata
- Class: Actinopterygii
- Order: Cypriniformes
- Family: Catostomidae
- Genus: Catostomus
- Species: C. ardens

Binomial name
- Catostomus ardens D. S. Jordan & Gilbert, 1881

= Utah sucker =

Species of fish

The Utah sucker (Catostomus ardens) is a species of freshwater fish in the family Catostomidae found in the upper Snake River and the Lake Bonneville areas of western North America where it lives in a wide range of habitats. It is a large sucker growing up to 25 in (64 cm) long. It is generally blackish above, vaguely streaked and blotched, with a white belly. A narrow rosy lateral band extends backwards from the head. The mouth has thick lips and is on the underside of the head. Some populations are in decline because of anthropogenic factors but overall this fish is not threatened.

== Description ==
This is a large fish that can grow up to 25.5 in (65 cm) in length. Relatively elongate for a sucker, the back area between the head and dorsal fin is somewhat elevated. The mouth is entirely under the snout, with thick lips, of which the upper lip has eight rows of coarse papillae, the second and third rows from the inside being significantly larger. Color is generally blackish above, with a faint pattern of blotches or spots, a narrow rosy band on the anterior part of each side, while the underside is white. The long anal fin is placed well back, the tip reaching as far back as the base of the caudal fin. The anal fin has seven rays, while the dorsal has 13 rays. Recent genetic studies have revealed deep, but morphologically cryptic, population subdivision (about 4.5% sequence divergence) between drainages of the ancient Snake River and the Bonneville Basin.

== Distribution ==
The Utah sucker is native to the upper Snake River and the Lake Bonneville areas of western North America. It lives in a variety of habitats in its range, being found in lakes, rivers, and streams, in warm or cold water, and over substrates of silt, sand, gravel, or rocks, preferably in the vicinity of vegetation.

== Status ==
Some populations are in decline due to anthropogenic factors, including habitat destruction, water-flow diversion, migration barriers, chemical pollutants, and competition with exotic species.

In 1881, David Starr Jordan and Charles Henry Gilbert observed that this sucker "occurs in Utah Lake in numbers which are simply enormous"; the population seems to have boomed and crashed several times since then.

Taxonomic nomenclature for this species is disputable, with Catostomus ardens in Utah Lake being confused with the June sucker, Chasmistes liorus, and the name Catostomus fecundus being used for a time.
