= Bird Island, Utah =

Island in Utah lake

Coordinates: 40.1762°N 111.8020°W

Bird Island
- Interactive map of Bird Island

Geography
- Location: Utah
- Adjacent to: Utah Lake

Bird Island is an island located in the southwest quadrant of Utah Lake in Utah County, Utah, located about 8 miles (13 km) southwest of Provo and roughly 2.25 miles off the nearest shore.

The island is primarily gravel and small rocks and has populations of walleye, white bass, and channel catfish. There are a few small trees that can be seen on the island from the nearest shore. In some years, when the water level is high, the island can become completely submerged.

== History ==
From 1899, which is the earliest documentation of the island, until the 1980s, the island was known as Rock Island and was primarily known for the large number of birds that nested there, such as the California gull, killdeer, white pelican. From 1931 to 1945, the SS Sho-Boat, a popular tourist boat on Utah Lake, took daily trips to Bird Island.
