= Utah Lake State Park =

State park in the U.S. state of Utah

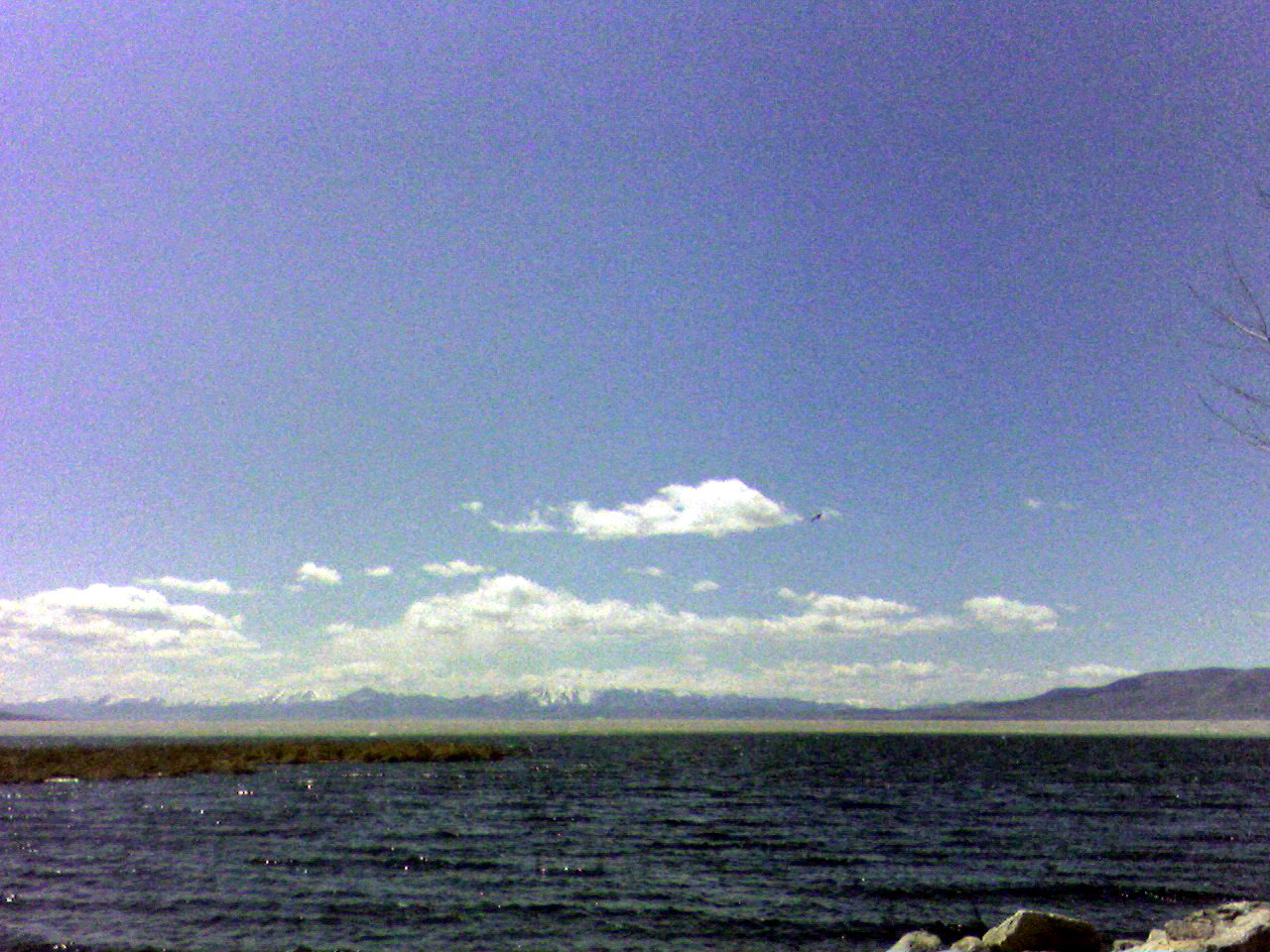
- The Provo River Delta is where the Provo River drains into Utah Lake. There is a clear contrast between the clear water of the river and the gray murky water of the lake.

- Location within Utah Location within the United States
- Interactive map of Utah Lake State Park
- Location: Utah County, Utah, United States
- Coordinates: 40°14′17″N 111°44′7″W
- Area: 308 acres (125 ha)
- Elevation: 4,500 ft (1,400 m)
- Opened: 1967
- Administrator: Utah State Parks
- Visitors: 263,809 (in 2025)
- Website: Official website
- Utah State Parks

Utah Lake State Park is a state park in Provo, Utah, United States. The park is located at the west end of Provo Center Street on the east shore of Utah Lake, the largest fresh water lake in the state, and immediately northwest of the Provo Municipal Airport. The park offers fishing for channel catfish, walleye, white bass, and black bass as well as swimming, boating, paddleboarding, RV camping, and a marina.
