= Hobble Creek (Utah County, Utah) =

Stream in Utah County, Utah, U.S.

Hobble Creek is a stream in Utah County, Utah. Its mouth lies at at its confluence with Utah Lake, at an elevation 4,491 feet (1,369 m). Its source is located at 40°09′45″N 111°30′03″W, at the confluence of the Left Fork and Right Fork Hobble Creek in the Wasatch Range. The source lies at an elevation 5,043 feet (1,537 m). The unincorporated community of Hobble Creek occupies the valley of the creek and its Left Fork.

Hobble Creek Canyon was surveyed for the route of the Denver and Salt Lake Railway (D&SL), which started construction in 1902 to connect its namesake cities via the Uinta Basin. Hobble Creek would have provided the connection from the Wasatch Front to the Uinta Basin. While most of the Colorado portion of the D&SL was built and is still in use today, the company went bankrupt before reaching Utah, and the line was never completed. In 2019, the Uinta Basin Rail project published their list of route alternatives for a new effort to link the Uinta Basin by rail. They examined the 1902 D&SL survey to determine if this right of way was still feasible; while the approach to the Uinta Basin from Colorado was seriously considered, the approach from the west, via Hobble Creek, was not advanced to the shortlist of viable options.

== See also ==
- List of rivers of Utah
