= Utah Lake =

Freshwater lake in Utah County, Utah, United States

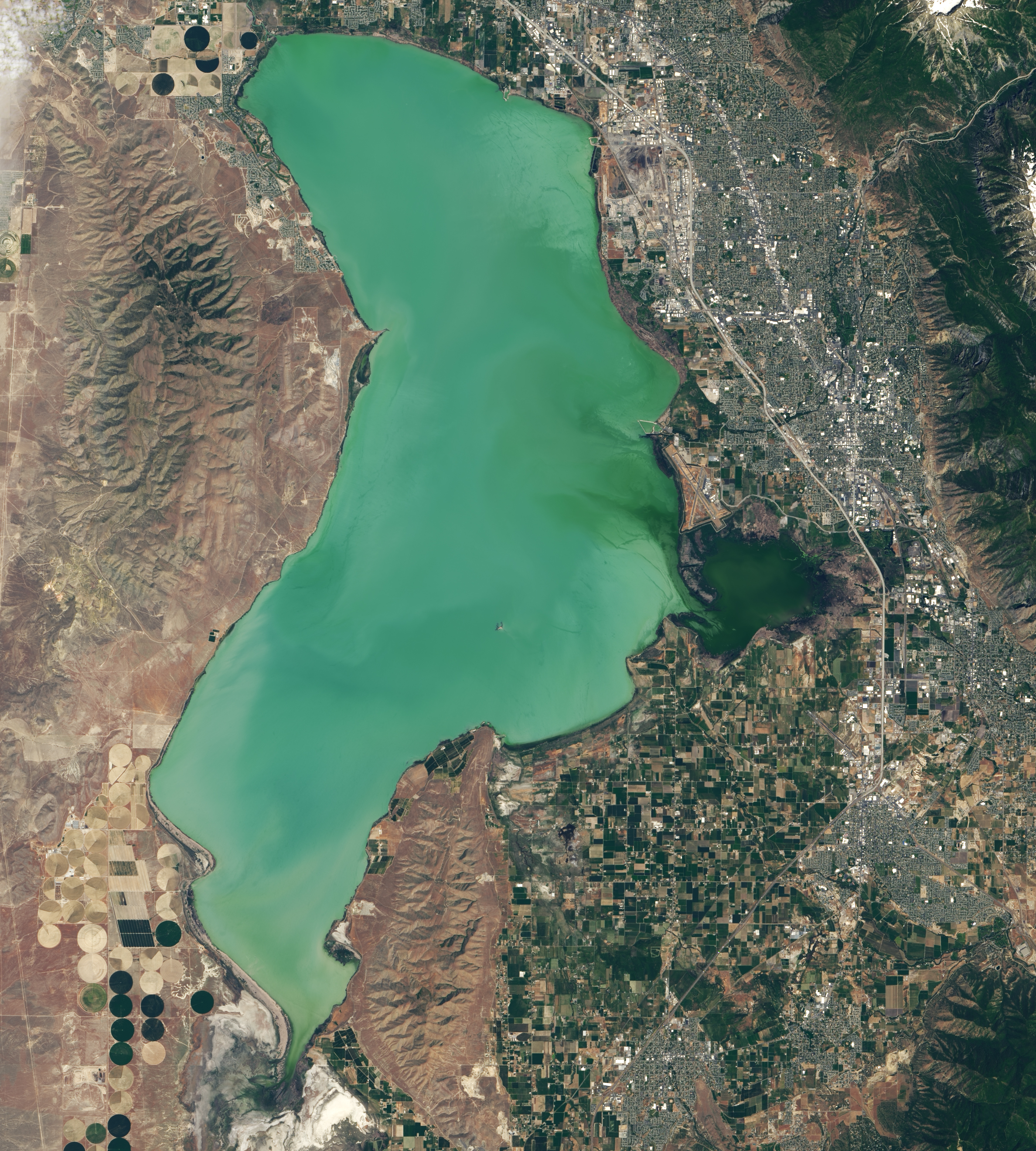
- Satellite photo of Utah Lake

- Location of within Utah Location within the United States
- Location: Utah County, Utah, United States
- Coordinates: 40°13′12″N 111°48′00″W
- Type: slightly saline Eutrophic
- Primary inflows: American Fork, Provo River, Hobble Creek, and Spanish Fork
- Primary outflows: Jordan River and evaporation
- Catchment area: 3,846 sq mi (9,960 km^{2})
- Basin countries: United States
- Managing agency: State of Utah
- Max. length: 24 mi (39 km)
- Max. width: 13 mi (21 km)
- Surface area: 95,000 acres (380 km^{2})
- Average depth: 10.5 ft (3.2 m)
- Max. depth: 14 ft (4.3 m)
- Water volume: 870,000 acre⋅ft (1.07×10^{9} m^{3})
- Surface elevation: 4,489 ft (1,368 m) (compromise)
- Islands: 1
- Settlements: Provo-Orem metropolitan area
- Website: utahlake.org

Utah Lake is a shallow freshwater lake in the center of Utah County, Utah, United States. It lies in Utah Valley, surrounded by the Provo-Orem metropolitan area. The lake's only river outlet, the Jordan River, is a tributary of the Great Salt Lake. Evaporation accounts for 42% of the lake's outflow, which leaves the lake slightly saline. The elevation of the lake is at 4,489 feet (1,368 m) above sea level. If the lake's water level rises above that, the pumps and gates on the Jordan River are left open.

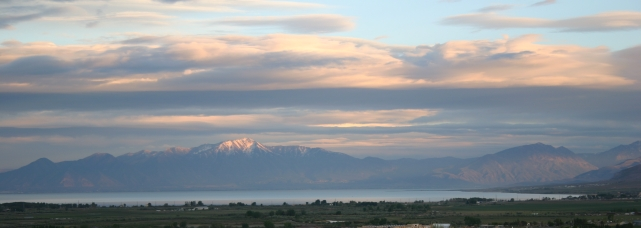
Utah Lake and Utah Valley

The first European to see Utah Lake was Father Silvestre Vélez de Escalante in 1776. He stayed with the Timpanogots band of Ute Tribe for three days. Mormon settlers later settled near the lake beginning in 1849, with the Timpanogots becoming mostly displaced from the area by 1872. The native fish species of the lake were overharvested by the settlers and subsequently restocked with non-native species.

Although thirteen species of fish were native to the lake, only the Utah sucker and the previously critically endangered, now threatened, June sucker remain. The dominant species in the lake is the common carp, introduced in 1883 as an alternative to the overharvested native fish. The carp is now estimated at 90% of the biomass of the lake and contributes to a decline in native fish populations by severely altering the ecosystem. Pollution has also caused problems with the lake's ecosystem. Raw sewage was dumped into the lake as late as 1967. Pollution problems still remain; the lake's phosphorus and mineral salt levels are in violation of the Clean Water Act. In recent years, the lake has been prone to harmful algal blooms or HABs.

Utah Lake is managed cooperatively by the Utah Division of Forestry, Fire & State Lands and the Utah Lake Authority. The Division manages public use and issues a permit for commercial users of the lakebed and shoreline while the Commission facilitates development. The lakebed and surrounding shoreline are made up of State Sovereign Lands. Utah Lake is one of three lakes in the state that were deemed "navigable" at statehood and granted to the State of Utah. Sovereign lands are managed under the public trust doctrine.

The Utah State Legislature has designated the Division of Forestry, Fire & State Lands as the executive authority for the management of sovereign lands and the state's mineral estates on lands other than school and institutional trust lands. Sovereign lands are defined by the Utah State Legislature as "those lands lying below the ordinary high water mark of navigable bodies of water at the date of statehood and owned by the state by virtue of its sovereignty."

The Commission was created by State statute in Utah's 2007 General Legislative Session, House Concurrent Resolution 1, under the authority of the Interlocal Cooperation Act. The Commission is funded and empowered by 17 area governments, including; Utah County and its municipalities, the Central Utah Water Conservancy District, and three state agencies. Founded in 2007, the Commission seeks to promote multiple public uses of the lake, facilitate orderly planning and development in and around the lake, and enable individual Commission members to govern their own areas.

== Name ==
European explorers initially called the lake "Lake Timpanogos" after the Timpanogos band of the Shoshone tribe. From 1825-1827, Belgian cartographer Philippe Vandermaelen (1795-1869) created and published Atlas Universel. Map number 47 in volume 4 of the atlas is titled "Partie du Mexique" and features an early illustrative depiction of Lac de Timpanogos. An 1827 letter written by American explorer Jedidiah Strong Smith contains an early reference to "Utah" as the name of the lake. In an article titled "Notes of Upper California" published in the Journal of the Royal Geographical Society of London in 1835, author Thomas Coulter indicated that "Lake Timpanogos" may have also been known as "Black Lake" by local hunters. While 1827 may date the earliest known reference to the name "Utah" for the lake, it is apparent from the 1835 article by Coulter that the change in name did not take hold right away. The precise origin of the name "Utah Lake" is unknown. One possible explanation is that it was named for the abundant reeds in and around the lake, called "Eu-tah". Another explanation is that it was incorrectly named after the Ute Tribe (Timpanogos are often incorrectly referred to as Ute).

== Geography ==
Utah Lake is within Utah Valley in north-central Utah. Mountains surround Utah Valley on three sides: the Wasatch Range to the east, Traverse Mountains to the north, and the Lake Mountains to the west. Mount Nebo reaches an altitude of 11,863-foot (3,616 m), and Mount Timpanogos reaches an altitude of 11,745-foot (3,580 m), nearly 7,250 feet (2,210 m) above the valley floor. Jutting into the south portion of the lake is 6,805-foot (2,074 m) West Mountain, which divides Goshen Bay and Lincoln Beach. Utah Lake is situated on the western edge of the valley and covers more than 25% of Utah Valley's floor. Because of its location on the western side of the valley, the eastern shore has a gentle slope and the western shore rises abruptly against the Lake Mountains. Connected to the main body of the lake are two large, shallow bays: the aforementioned Goshen Bay (north Goshen Valley) to the south and Provo Bay to the east. Major cities such as Provo and Orem are located between the lake's eastern shore and the Wasatch Range.

Utah Lake is a remnant of a much larger pleistocene lake called Lake Bonneville, which existed from 75,000 to 8,000 years ago. At its peak 30,000 years ago, Lake Bonneville reached an elevation of 5,090 feet (1,550 m) above sea level and had a surface area of 19,800 square miles (51,000 km^{2}), which was nearly as large as Lake Michigan. The weight of the lake depressed sections of the lake bottom by as much as 240 feet (73 m) before the surface rebounded when the lake dried up. About 12,000 years ago, the climate of the region became warmer and drier. As evaporation rates exceeded inflow rates, the lake began to dry up, leaving Utah Lake, the Great Salt Lake, Sevier Lake, and Rush Lake as remnants.

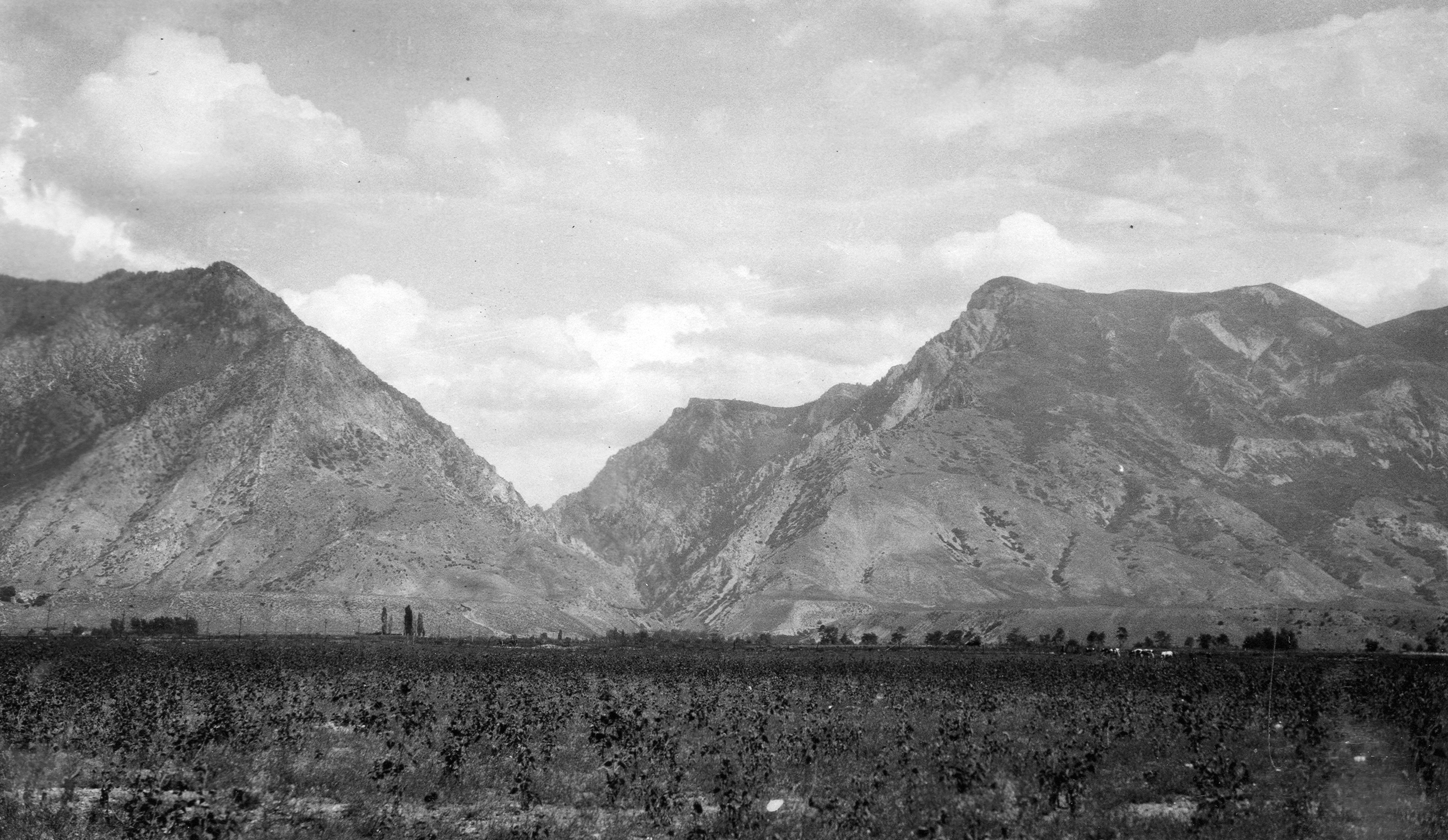
Wasatch Range and ancient shoreline of Lake Bonneville

Over the roughly 65,000 years that Lake Bonneville existed, sediments built up, creating a lacustrine plain over Utah Valley. As a result, the valley floor and lake bed are relatively flat, which causes the lake to be shallow. The lake has a maximum depth of just under 14 feet (4.3 m) and an average depth of about 10.5 feet (3.2 m). This shallowness allows winds to easily stir up sediments from the lake's bottom, contributing to the turbidity or the impression of pollution seen in Utah Lake's water.

Three faults run under Utah Lake. One of the faults, the Bird Island fault, runs under the eastern edge of the lake and helps give rise to hot springs near Lincoln Beach. The other major hot spring is on the northern shore and is called Saratoga Springs. The hot springs mostly result from the development of hydraulic pressure as the ground water slopes toward the middle of the lake.

The lake contains a small island called Bird Island, about 2.25 miles (3.62 km) north of the Lincoln Beach boat ramp, near its south end. The island has a few trees and is somewhat visible from Lincoln Beach. During high-water years, the island may be completely submerged, the trees being the only indication it is there. It is a fairly popular destination among fishermen seeking walleye, white bass, and channel catfish.

== Hydrology ==
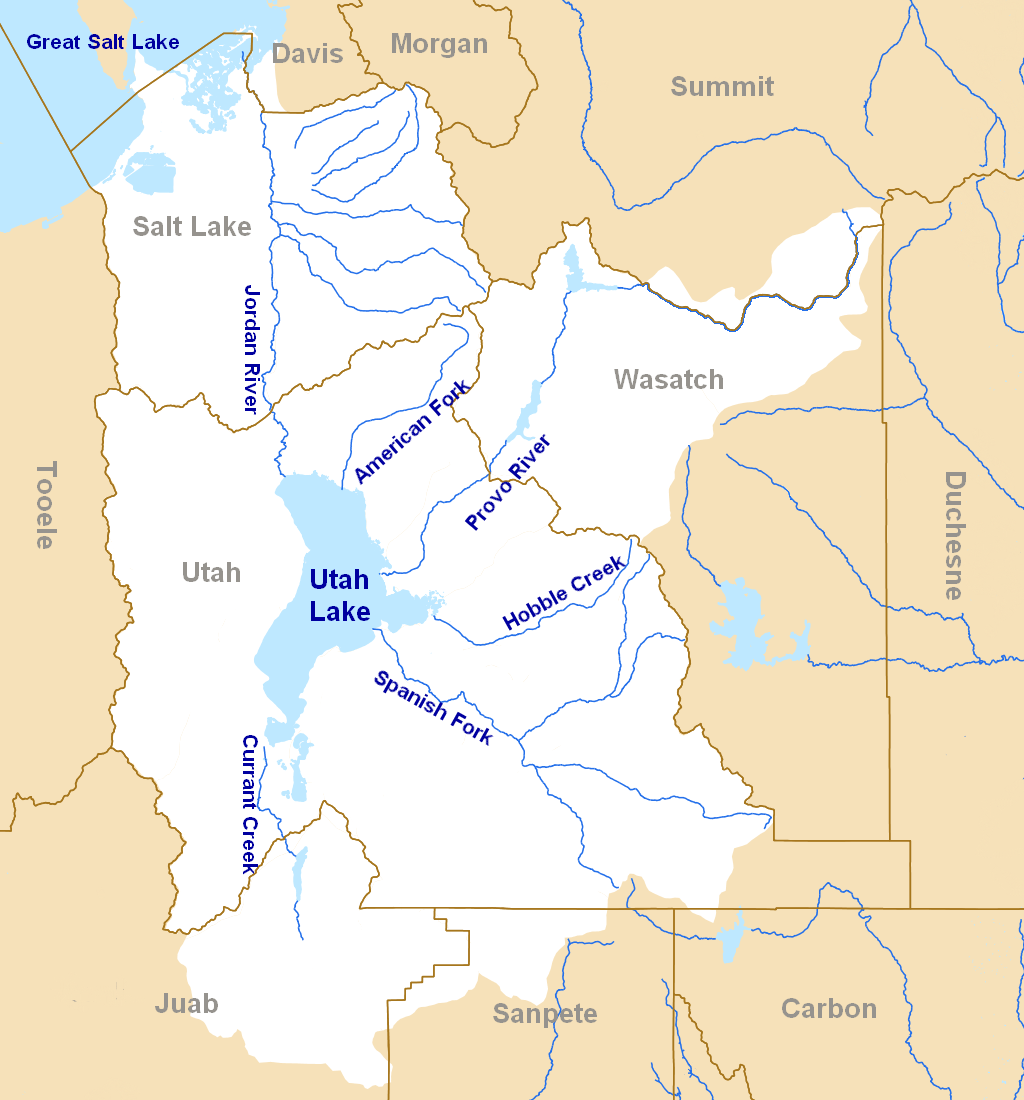
Map of the Jordan River Basin

The Utah Lake watershed drains 3,846 square miles (9,960 km^{2}) over mostly mountainous terrain. The watershed's highest point is at 11,765-foot (3,586 m) Bald Mountain in the Uinta Mountains. 782,335 acres (3,166 km^{2}) (32%) are managed by the United States Forest Service, 249,329 acres (1,009 km^{2}) (11%) are managed by other government entities, and the majority of the rest, 1,263,696 acres (5,114 km^{2}) (51%), are privately owned.

Two major tributaries account for nearly 60% of inflow by streams or rivers into Utah Lake. The Provo River accounts for 36% of the inflow, and the Spanish Fork river accounts for 24%. Other tributaries include the American Fork river, Current Creek, Dry Creek, Hobble Creek, and Mill Race Creek. Additionally, many hot springs and smaller creeks are flowing into the lake. Utah Lake is drained by the Jordan River, which begins at the lake's north end. The river flows north through Utah, Salt Lake, and Davis counties and then into the southeast portion of the Great Salt Lake. Given the lake's semi-arid climate, large surface area, and shallow average depth, evaporation accounts for 42% of Utah Lake's outflow.

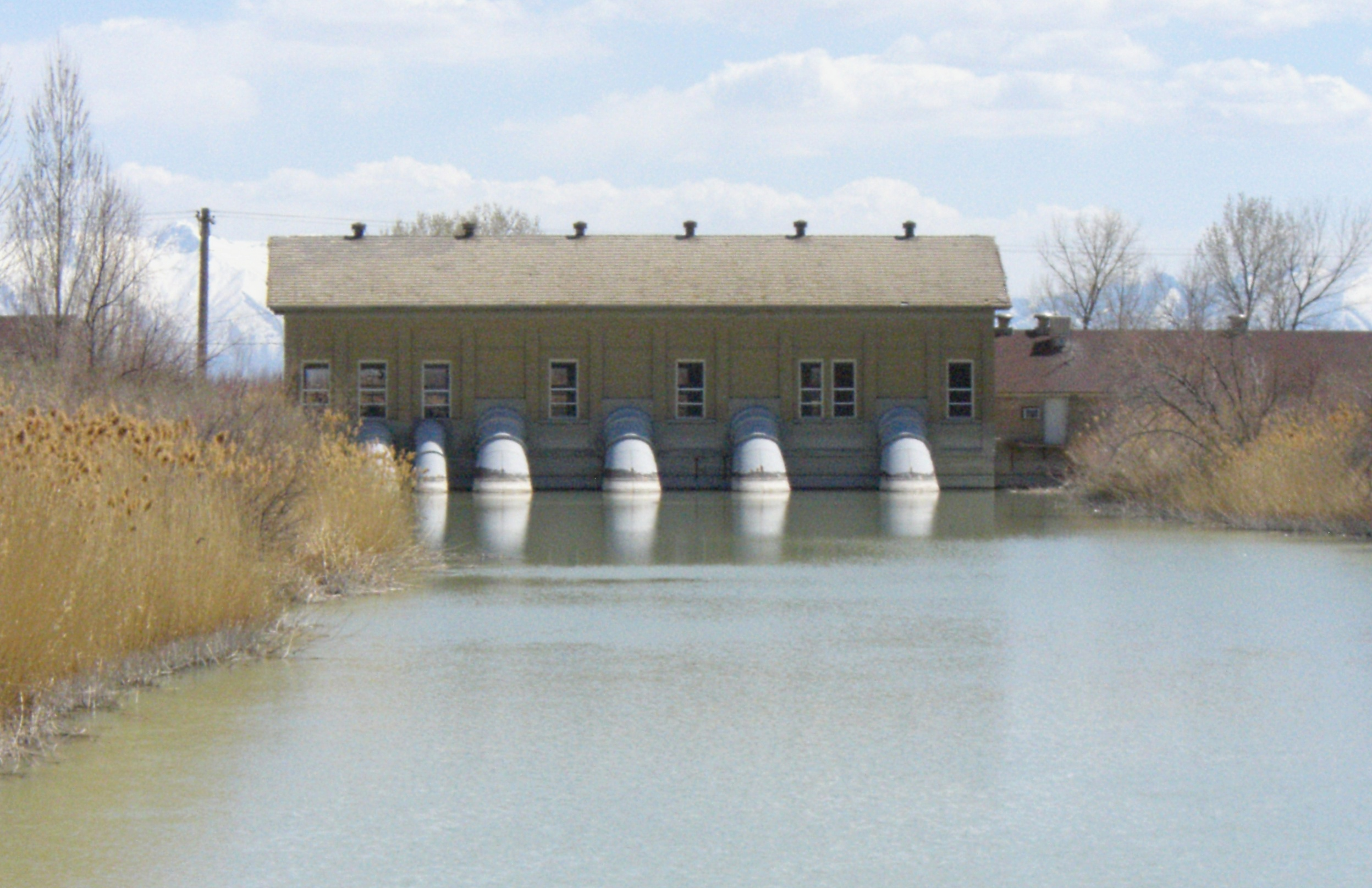
Jordan River pumping station at Utah Lake, April 2010

After several years of drought, irrigation companies argued over their share of Utah Lake's water from the Jordan River. Judge Morse of the Third District Court issued his judgment known as the Morse Decree of 1901. The decree stated that the irrigation companies "are entitled to a decree awarding to them, subject to the limitations hereinafter set forth, the right to the use of all the balance of the waters of the Jordan River, for municipal, irrigation, culinary, and domestic purposes, to the extent of the capacity of their several canals, and the right to impound and store all of the waters of said river in Utah Lake." In response to the drought, a pumping plant was installed at the outlet of the Jordan River from Utah Lake. It was the largest pumping plant in the United States at the time. The plant contained seven pumps with a total capacity of 700 cubic feet (20 m^{3}) per second. After the decree was released, Utah Lake essentially became an irrigation reservoir, and the Jordan River's flow was highly regulated.

As a result of the 1983–1984 flooding, a lawsuit was filed for compensation due to flooding based upon breach of contract of the previous compromise level. In 1985, a new compromise level was reached, which governed the maximum level of the lake. The new level was chosen to be 4,489 feet (1,368 m) above sea level. When the water level in Utah Lake exceeds this level, the Jordan River pumps and gates are left open. The new compromise level also meant that the lake's elevation was below Jordan River's stream bed.

=== Pollution ===
In 1948, a study showed Utah Lake was being seriously polluted. As a result, Utah County cities decided to plan how and where to build sewage treatment plants instead of dumping raw sewage into the lake. By 1954, many cities had constructed sewage treatment plants, but Provo's was still under construction. Raw sewage was still getting into the lake by 1967.

In the State of Utah, the Utah Division of Water Quality and Utah Division of Drinking Water are responsible for the management and regulation of water quality. Lakes, rivers, and streams that exceed the standard levels are then placed on the DEQ 303d list in accordance with the Clean Water Act. The Act requires states to identify impaired water bodies every two years and develop a total maximum daily load (TMDL) for pollutants that a body of water can assimilate without causing the water body to exceed the water quality standards. Utah Lake was originally put on Utah's 2000 and 2004 303d list for phosphorus and total dissolved solids (TDS) exceeding recommend values. High levels of phosphorus can cause high levels of nuisance algae growth, low dissolved oxygen, and eleTDS tells about the concentration of mineral salts in the water, which can cause problems to agriculture and culinary water supplies. Excess levels of phosphorus come from multiple sources, but namely the wastewater treatment plants, are extremely concerning when it comes to Utah Lake management because high levels can trigger harmful algal blooms and eutrophication There is some discussion as to how much of the phosphorus is the result of anthropogenic causes and how much is the result of historic phosphorus stored in the lake sediment.

Krissy Wilson of Utah's Division of Wildlife Resources stated in 2010 that water quality is now improving, with greater flows of water, among other things, contributing to the improvement. However, the presence and activity of carp, which stir up solids in the water, makes it difficult to appreciate the improvement without conducting scientific measurements.

=== Harmful algal blooms in Utah Lake ===
There are several cyanobacteria species that are especially common when phosphorus levels and temperature, among other unknown criteria, are favorable for harmful algal blooms. These are Aphanizomenon flos-aquae and Dolichospermum flosaquae species, both of which produce cyanotoxins. If levels are high enough for either species and others, the lake is closed to the public.

== History ==
=== Pre-European ===
The first inhabitants of the area were nomadic hunter-gatherers of the Desert Archaic Culture. An archeology site, called the Soo'nkahni Village, has been explored next to the Jordan River in Draper. The site dates back 3,000 years, and over 30,000 artifacts have been found. The next recorded inhabitants were the Fremont people who lived in the Utah Lake area from about 400 AD to about 1350 AD. They consisted of small villages of hunters and farmers. They farmed corn, squash, and beans. When climatic conditions changed, they caused trouble for farming. Also, the ancestors to the Ute, Paiute, and Northwestern Shoshone moved into the area. As a result, the Fremont people left the area.

The third group inhabited the area was the Utes of central Utah and eastern Colorado. The Timpanogot (also called Timpanogos, Timpanogotzi, Timpannah, and Tempenny) band of the Utes inhabited Utah Valley. They were the most dominant band of Utes due to the relative ease of gathering the plentiful local food supply. It was a sacred meeting place for the Timpanogos, Ute and Shoshone tribes. During the spring spawning season, these tribes would meet at Utah Lake for the annual fish festival. At the festival, there was dancing, singing, trading, horse races, gambling, and feasting on the plentiful fish the lake provided. It was also an opportunity to find a mate from another clan. In 1826, Jedediah Smith visited a camp along the Spanish Fork river that had 35 lodges with about 175 people.

=== European explorers ===
Franciscan missionary Silvestre Vélez de Escalante, while on his expedition in late summer and early autumn of 1776, was trying to find a land route from Santa Fe, New Mexico to Monterey, California. Two Timpanogots from Utah Valley acted as guides for his party. On September 23, 1776, the party traveled down Spanish Fork Canyon and entered the Utah Valley. From Escalante's journal, he describes Utah Lake: "The lake, which must be six leagues wide and fifteen leagues long, extends as far as one of these valleys. It runs northwest through a narrow passage, and according to what they told us, it communicates with others much larger. This lake of Timpanogotzis abounds in several kinds of good fish, geese, beaver, and other amphibious animals which did not have an opportunity to see. Round about it is these Indians, who live on the abundant fish of the lake, for which reason the Yutas Sabuaganas call them "Come Pescados" (Fish Eaters). Besides this, they gather in the plain grass seeds from which they make atole, which they supplement by hunting hares, rabbits, and fowl of which there is great abundance here." Escalante named the lake Lake Timpanogos, after the tribe living in the area. Escalante's record clearly distinguishes between this Lake Timpanogos, a body of freshwater that he saw and sized, and the Great Salt Lake, which he did not see or name but was described to him as a river "communicates with others much larger." The next recorded European visitor was Étienne Provost, a French-Canadian trapper who visited Utah Lake in October 1824. The city of Provo and the Provo River are named after him.

=== Early settlement by members of the Church of Jesus Christ of Latter-day Saints ===
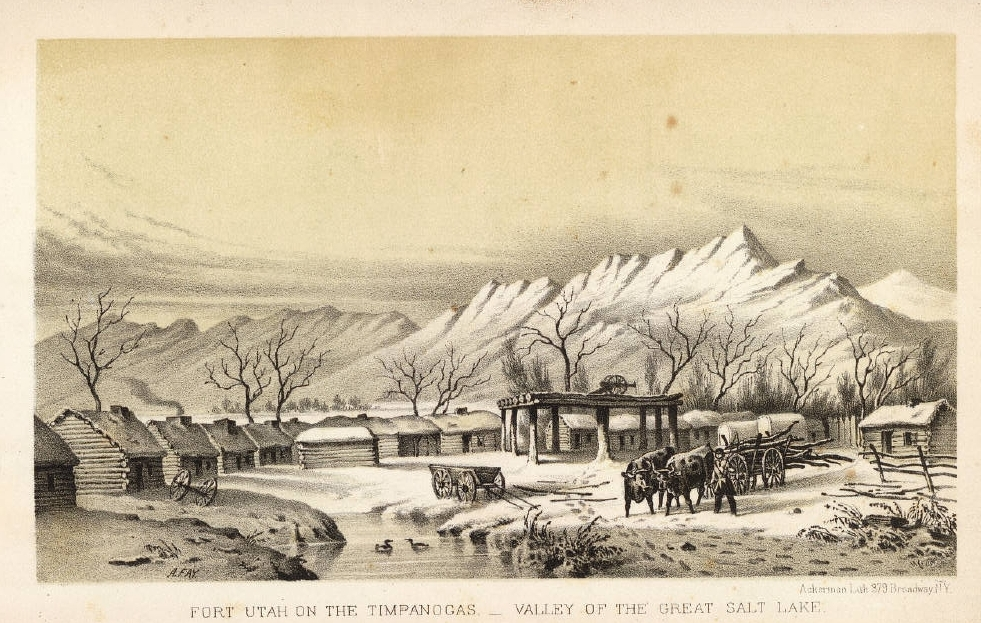
Illustration of Fort Utah in 1850

The settlement of Utah by members of the Church of Jesus Christ of Latter-day Saints began in July 1847, when pioneers entered the Salt Lake Valley. Under the direction of Parley P. Pratt, an exploration of Utah Valley was conducted. The party brought a small boat in which they explored Utah Lake and caught fish with their nets. The first battle between settlers and Indians occurred in early March 1849. A company of forty men was sent into Utah Valley to stop the stealing of cattle from the Salt Lake Valley. The company met in the village of Little Chief, who told them where the people responsible for the stealing were located. A skirmish took place in which four Timpanogots were killed. The settlers named the site of the skirmish Battle Creek, which was later renamed Pleasant Grove.

In April 1849, a group of about thirty families came into Utah Valley and settled on the Provo River, very close to the main Timpanogot village on the Provo River. The settlers built a stockade called Fort Utah and armed it with a twelve-pound cannon to intimidate the Timpanogots. In August, a Timpanogot named Old Bishop was murdered by three settlers over a shirt they wanted from him. Some Timpanogots shot at cattle or stole corn in response. Winter was especially hard, and Timpanogots stole cattle for food. By January 1850, settlers of Fort Utah reported to officials in Salt Lake City that the situation was getting dangerous. They wanted a military party to attack the Timpanogots. A militia was sent from Salt Lake City, and on February 8 and 11, they engaged the Timpanogots in battle. On February 14, eleven Timpanogots surrendered but were later executed while their families watched. A government surgeon went to the execution site and cut off the Timpanogots' heads for later examination. One militia man and 102 Timpanogots were killed. Over the ensuing years, fewer and fewer Timpanogots lived in Utah Valley, and by 1872, all Timpanogots had moved to the Uintah and Ouray Indian Reservation. However, some Timpanogots occasionally returned to fish on Utah Lake into the 1920s.

Captain Howard Stansbury of the United States Army's Corps of Topographical Engineers was ordered to map, survey, and explore Utah and Salt Lake Valleys. In 1850, Captain Stansbury explored Utah Lake and Utah Valley, surveyed and made observation of the local wildlife.

== Ecosystem ==
Historically, there have been four species of amphibia, twelve species of reptiles, thirteen species of fish, 152 species of birds, and forty-two species of mammals found in the environs of Utah Lake. The dumping of raw sewage, destruction of natural habit, hunting, and the introduction of non-native fish species have taken a toll on the native species in and around the lake.

Some of the mammals that live around the lake are the big brown bat, the silver-haired bat, mule deer, Botta's pocket gopher, desert woodrat, and striped skunk. There are seventeen known native mollusca to Utah Lake. Only three were reported in the lake ecosystem in 1969, and one species is extinct. The last living example of the thickshell pondsnail (Stagnicola utahensis), a freshwater snail, was reportedly seen in the early 1930s. Four specimens were sent to the Smithsonian Institution in 1911 and the only known location for the snail was Utah Lake.

=== Birds ===
During the 1800s and the 1930s, killing fish-eating birds were seen as a fish conservation measure. Local government entities gave bounties, and upon presenting evidence of offending dead birds, game officers paid the bounties. A report by a hunter states, "There was a bounty paid on cranes and heron in 1895. Two men could make as high as $66 a day. Wading into the rookeries with their pants off they would crack the heron over the head. When the bounty was paid on pelican we would use a fish float tide to a wad of rushes. Gulls were also caught. There has been 10,000 slaughtered. At the Big Channel gidls have been shot and there are four or five hundred pelicans which have been shot. In 1928 I killed 1,240 mudhens [coot]. We would eat the hearts and gizzards, take the feathers and oil and discard the rest."

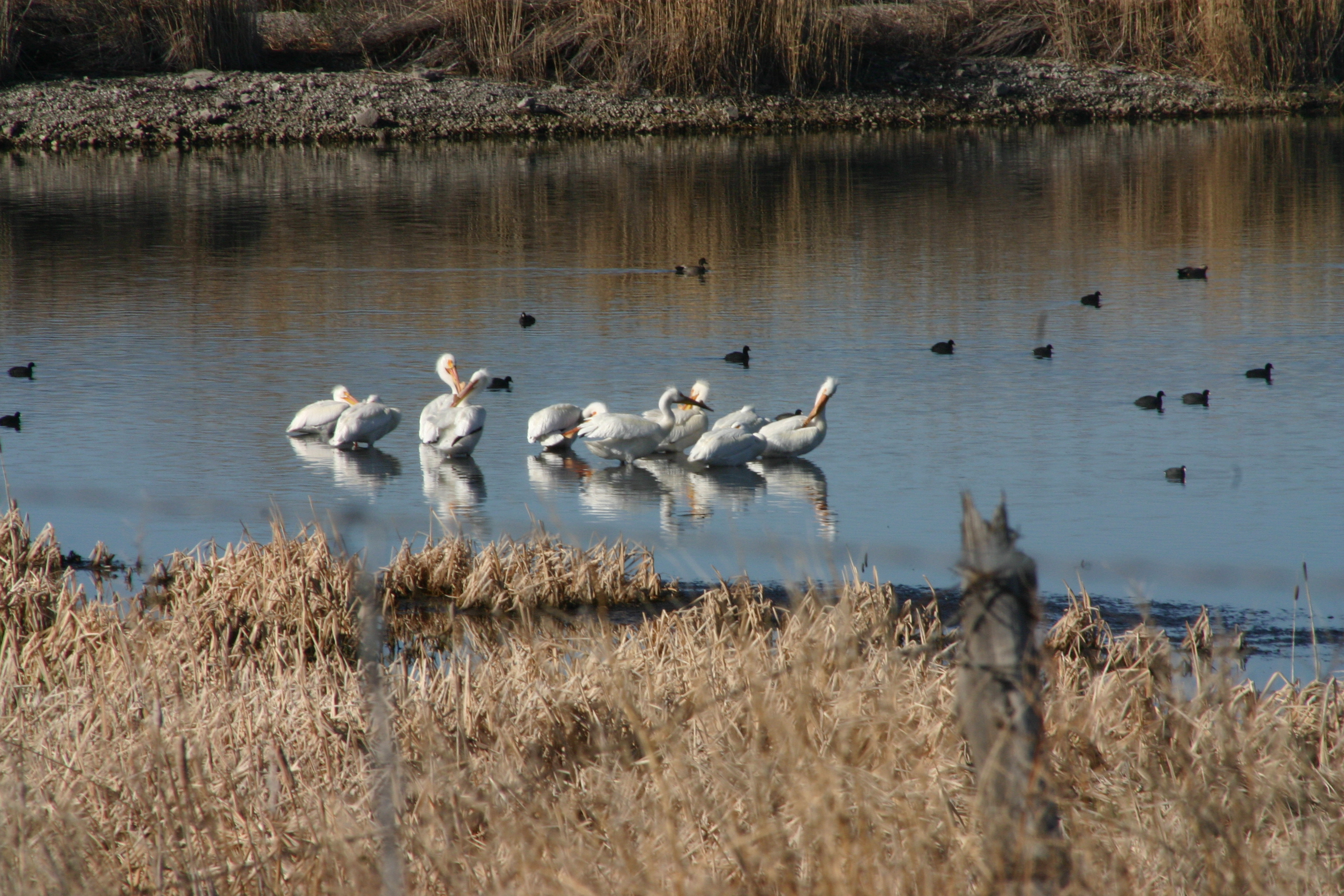
Pelicans and ducks at Utah Lake, April 2010

The Utah Lake wetland ecosystem is an important breeding area and stopover for migratory birds in the Pacific Flyway. Today, about 226 species of birds use the lake as their permanent home or as a stopover on their migration. The Utah Lake Wetland Preserve has been established at the south end of Utah Lake. It contains two units, one at Goshen bay with more than 21,750 acres (88.0 km^{2}) of land preserved, and another unit at Benjamin Slough. Birds seen at Utah Lake include sandhill crane, double-crested cormorant, great horned owl, turkey vulture, golden eagle, cinnamon teal duck, and mallard duck.

=== Fish ===
Parley P. Pratt visited Fort Utah in June 1849 and saw thousands of fish caught by settlers and Timpanogots. He estimated that 5000 barrels of fish could be secured annually from the fishery. The winter of 1885–1886 caused much of the livestock to die. Leaders of the Church of Jesus Christ of Latter-day Saints elders sent members in the Salt Lake Valley to Utah Lake to obtain fish; an estimated 96,000 pounds (44,000 kg) of fish were brought back. The first commercial fishery also started the same year. At the 1870 General Conference of the LDS Church, a committee was appointed to develop fish culture because of the declining fish harvest in Utah Lake. By 1904, it became illegal to commercially catch any fish except for non-native species.

At least 25 species have been introduced into Utah Lake's waters. Thirteen introductions were unsuccessful. Carp, largemouth bass, white bass, black bullhead, channel catfish, walleye, goldfish, yellow perch, blue gill, and black crappie are found in abundance. The golden shiner and the fathead minnow are rarely found.

Of the thirteen species of fish native to Utah Lake, one species is extinct (the Utah Lake sculpin), one is no longer present in the lake and is under review to see if it qualifies for protection under the Endangered Species Act (least chub), one is already listed as endangered (the June sucker), and one is found in relative abundance throughout Utah (the Utah sucker). All other native fish are no longer extant in the lake.

The Bonneville cutthroat trout was historically the top predator fish in the ecosystem but is now restricted to tributary streams. A review in 2008 indicates that viable populations are distributed throughout its historic range and do not merit listing as a threatened or endangered species.

The Utah Lake sculpin was last found in 1928 and likely became extinct in the 1930s after severe drought lowered the lake levels, allowing much of the lake to freeze, overcrowding fish in unfrozen portions of the lake. This overcrowding and pollution from agricultural runoff are probable causes of the fish's extinction.

The Bonneville redside shiner, mottled sculpin, leatherside chub, Utah chub, speckled dace, longnose dace, mountain whitefish and mountain sucker are no longer in the lake, but still exist in tributaries.

The June sucker was federally listed as an endangered species in 1986. The lower 5 miles (8.0 km) of the Provo River is the only known spawning location for the species. Biologists have been rearing the June sucker in Red Butte Reservoir and releasing them into Utah Lake to help build the population. During the summer of 2005, over 8,000 June sucker were released into Utah Lake. The June Sucker Recovery Implementation Program (JSRIP) coordinates and implements recovery actions for the June sucker. As of February 3, 2021 the June sucker was officially down-listed from "endangered" to "threatened"; a direct result of conservation efforts made by the JSRIP and its partners.

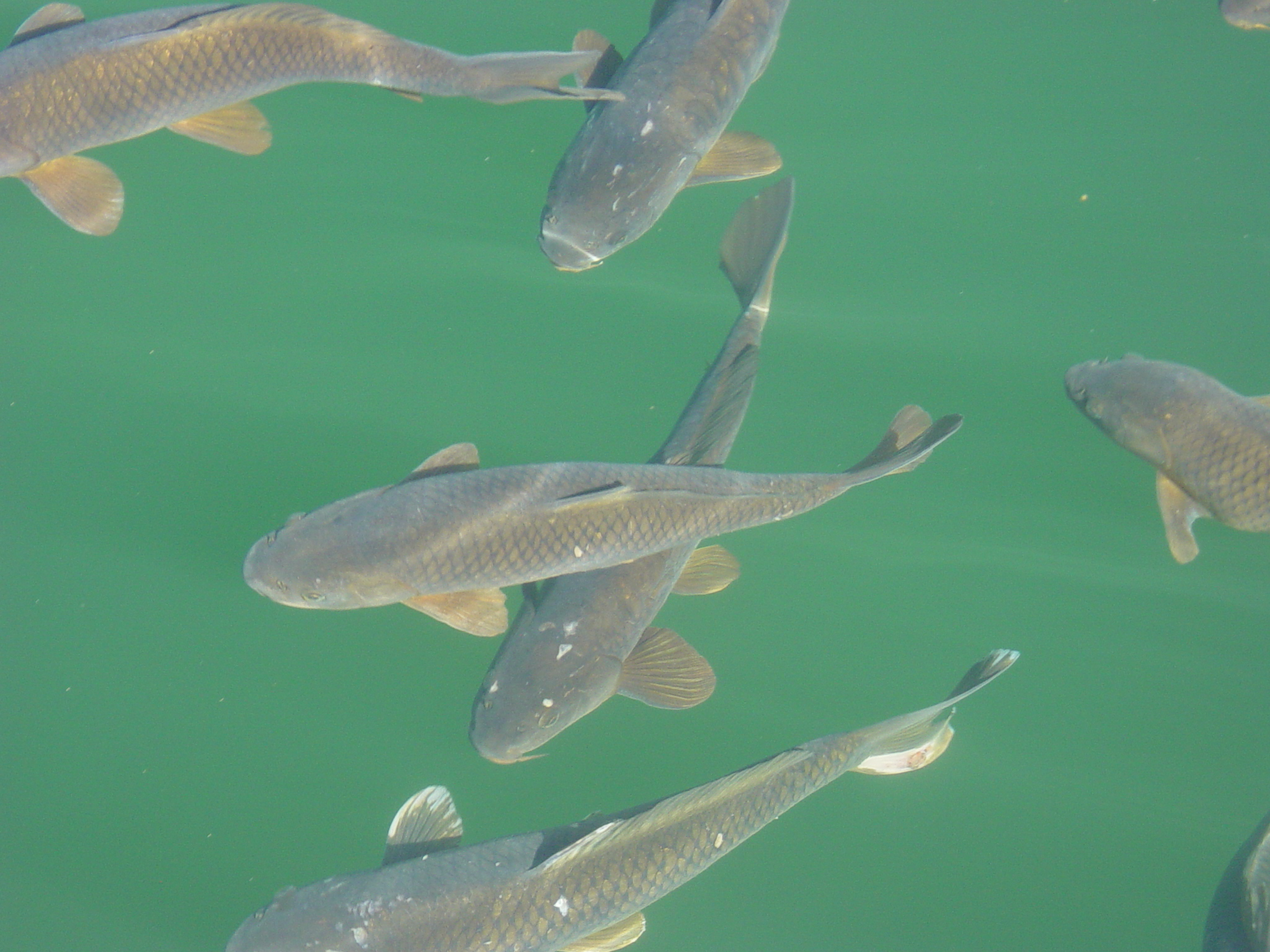
Common carp, such as these in Lake Powell, are the dominant species of fish in the lake.

The common carp was introduced in 1883 as a source of food after native species had been depleted by overfishing. It is now the most prevalent fish found in Utah Lake. Carp makes up about 90% of the lake's biomass, with an adult population numbering around 7.5 million. The average carp in the lake is about 5.3 pounds (2.4 kg), for a total of nearly 40,000,000 pounds (18,000,000 kg) of carp in the lake.

As early as 1901, fish and wildlife representatives noted that carp were causing the trout population in the lake to collapse. Due to their habit of grubbing through bottom sediments for food, carp stir up sediments and increase the turbidity of the water. In addition, they destroy submerged vegetation that holds sediments in place and provides shelter for native fish populations. Without vegetation, winds can more easily stir up sediment from the bottom of the lake, which is already a problem due to the lake's shallowness, resulting in greater turbidity and less sunlight reaching the remaining vegetation. Without cover for their young, native fish, such as the June sucker, become easy prey for white bass, walleye, and other predators.

Efforts are underway to reduce the population of carp in Utah Lake by employing local commercial fishermen, led by Bill Loy, Jr., to remove 5 million pounds of carp each year as part of the June Sucker Recovery Implementation Program's efforts to restore Utah Lake to a habitat in which the June sucker can survive. The intent is to cause a crash in the carp population which will allow the ecosystem to begin to rebuild and the June sucker to reestablish dominance in the lake.

The Utah Lake Commission has previously stated its goal is to remove 32 million pounds of carp from the lake, and more than 17 million pounds have been removed as of November 2019.

== Recreation ==
Due to its proximity to the Provo-Orem metropolitan area, Utah Lake is a fairly popular destination. From the 1880s to the 1930s, up to twelve resorts offering boat rentals, picnic facilities, dance halls, swimming pools, and bathhouses served tourists at the lake. Saratoga Springs, on the north shore, was the most popular and longest-lived resort. Saratoga Springs was best known for its natural hot springs but also had waterslides and amusement park rides. It lasted from the 1860s until the floods of 1984. In the summer, fishing, water skiing, boating, camping, and picnicking are the most popular activities. During the winter, ice fishing, ice hockey, and ice skating are popular on the lake, especially at Utah Lake State Park, and Lincoln Beach. The main marina for Utah Lake is at Utah Lake State Park on the lake's eastern shore. Other marinas are at Saratoga Springs, American Fork, Lindon, and Lincoln Beach.

== Legal issues ==
The ownership of lands along the shoreline of Utah Lake has been in dispute between the State of Utah and farmers for many years. The bed of Utah Lake, along with other natural lakes, was granted to the state upon admission to the Union in 1896. However, due to the lack of an exact definition and significantly fluctuating lake levels, intermittently dry areas, and wetlands, including all of Provo Bay, have been claimed and farmed by surrounding land owners. The U.S. Supreme Court ruled in 1987 that the State of Utah owned the land beneath Utah Lake.

In January 2018, the Utah Department of Natural Resources received a project proposal as a potential solution to the lake's nutrient pollution, invasive species, and murky water. The project proposal involved dredging the lake bottom of all nutrient-loaded sediment, replacing invasive plant and animal species with native species, and restoring the water quality before building and developing housing on arch-shaped islands. The proposal became known as the Utah Lake Restoration project, and had an estimated cost of $6.4 billion which would be obtained through private investors. The proposal led to the creation of the House Bill 272 - Utah Lake Amendments (HB 272), which asserted that Utah Lake faced serious challenges, that conservation and restoration were possible, and in the interest of the state, and authorized "the Division of Forestry, Fire, and State Lands to dispose of state land in exchange for the execution of a project for the comprehensive restoration of Utah Lake," an act which would otherwise be prohibited. On March 21, 2018, Governor Gary Herbert signed HB 272 into law.

Critics of the project include ecologists and other scientists raising hydrologic and ecological concerns with the project. Specific issues include the fact that the project would likely lead to the creation of anoxic waters due to lake stratification, the destruction of the lake's unique hydrology and biogeochemistry, the release of toxins and nutrients, altering the lake from its natural state, and geology unsuitable for supporting inhabited islands. Other critics disputed the passing of HB272 as an attempt to trade sovereign lands in exchange for a service. The ability of the developer to maintain the alterations to the lake after the completion of the project has also been brought into question.

In October 2022, permitting for the Utah Lake Restoration project was put on hold, according to the U.S. Army Corps of Engineers, because of a lack of documentation required to win federal permits under the Clean Water Act.

On October 27, 2022, Utah's Division of Forestry, Fire & State Lands rejected the proposal by Lake Restoration Solutions. The division director Jamie Barnes said that the lake bed is sovereign state land and cannot be privatized.

== Environmental concerns ==
In 2008, Utah Lake's carp and channel catfish were found to be contaminated by polychlorinated biphenyls, also known as PCB's. After an investigation, no originating source for the PCBs was found.

The lake was closed due to contamination from toxic algae in 2016, 2018, and 2019.

== Recovery efforts ==
=== June Sucker Recovery Implementation Program (JSRIP) ===
The June Sucker is a species of fish endemic to Utah Lake and its tributaries. The June Sucker is a key indicator species for the overall health of the ecosystem. Though listed as endangered in 1986 after ecosystem degradation and invasive species concentration, thanks to the efforts of the JSRIP, the June Sucker was downlisted to "threatened" on February 3, 2021. Actions taken to recover the June Sucker include non-native species removal, specifically carp and Northern pike; increasing the population through stocking and monitoring; and restoring and maintaining habitat, including the tributaries Hobble Creek and the Provo River.

==== Provo River Delta Restoration Project ====
In an effort to recover the June Sucker and restore the area's natural ecosystem, the Provo River Delta Restoration Project is an ongoing process in which a large portion of the lower Provo River flow is diverted into a series of channels and wetlands before reaching Utah Lake. The restored delta area provides a habitat for juvenile June Suckers to grow to a survivable size. The project also provides for improved trail and river access, fishing platforms, and other recreational facilities. The project began in 2020 and was completed in October of 2024, with support from the Infrastructure Investment and Jobs Act.

=== Phragmites removal ===
Phragmites is an aggressive, invasive plant species that dominates a large portion of the Utah Lake shoreline. Since 2014, a large-scale collaborative effort has been underway to mitigate the negative effects of the species through the use of herbicides and crushing techniques. Reports in 2020 indicated a 70% decrease in phragmites.

=== Utah Lake Water Quality Study (ULWQS) ===
The purpose of the ULWQS is to gather data on the nutrient concentrations (particularly nitrogen and phosphorus) in Utah Lake and develop nutrient criteria to protect the ecosystem. Phase 1 of the project, Data Gathering, was completed in 2018. Phase 2 is Developing Criteria followed by Phase 3, Implementation. In a 2025 report to the state legislature the Utah Lake Authority reported that, contrary to popular belief, water quality was not correlated with carp population biomass. Instead, the authority suggested that lake level is the primary controlling factor.

=== Planned research center ===
In March of 2026 $7.7 million in federal funding was approved for habitat restoration, invasive species removal, and expanded recreational access. The majority of the funds will go towards the construction of a research facility which will help monitor the lake, as well as provide learning opportunities and promote community engagement. $1.2 million was set aside specifically for the continued removal of carp.

== Utah Lake folklore ==
In the late 1800s and early 1900s, there were several reported sightings of strange creatures in the lake, leading to tales of a lake monster with descriptions of the cryptid's appearance varying from being reptilian with an alligator's head to being seal-like.

== See also ==
- Lake Bonneville
- Great Salt Lake
- Jordan River

== Bibliography ==
=== Books ===
- Bancroft, Hubert Howe (1889), History of Utah: 1540–1886, San Francisco: The History Company, hdl:2027/uc1.$b41674, ISBN 978-0-913814-49-9
- Farmer, Jared (2008), On Zion's Mount: Mormons, Indians, and the American Landscape, Boston: Harvard University Press, ISBN 978-0-674-02767-1
- Janetski, Joel C. (1990), The Ute of Utah Lake, Salt Lake City: University of Utah Press, ISBN 978-0-87480-343-3
- Jensen, Jens Marinus (1924), History of Provo, Utah, Provo, Utah: New Century Press, ISBN 978-0-9601656-1-2
- Madsen, David B. (2002), Exploring the Fremont, Salt Lake City: Utah Museum Natural History, ISBN 978-0-940378-35-3
- Stansbury, Howard (1852), Exploration and Survey of the valley of the Great Salt Lake of Utah, United States Senate

=== Journal articles ===
- Alter, Cecil (1941), "Journal of W.A. Ferris 1830–1835", Utah Historical Quarterly, 9, doi:10.2307/45057569, JSTOR 45057569, S2CID 254445343
- Jennings, Jesse D. (1960), "The Aboriginal Peoples", Utah Historical Quarterly, 28 (5): 210–221, doi:10.2307/45058195, JSTOR 45058195, S2CID 254442584
- Miller, S. A.; Crowl, T. A. (2006), "Effects of common carp (Cyprinus carpio) on macrophytes and invertebrate communities in a shallow lake" (PDF), Freshwater Biology, 51 (1): 85, Bibcode:2006FrBio..51...85M, CiteSeerX 10.1.1.497.3430, doi:10.1111/j.1365-2427.2005.01477.x
- Oliver, George V.; Bosworth III, William R. (June 30, 1999), "Rare,_Imperiled,_and_Recently_Extinct_or_Extirpated_Mollusks_of_Utah", U.S. Government Documents
- Oviatt, Charles G. (February 1997), "Lake Bonneville fluctuations and global climate change", Geology, 25 (2): 155–158, Bibcode:1997Geo....25..155O, doi:10.1130/0091-7613(1997)025<0155:LBFAGC>2.3.CO;2
- Wood, Stephen L, ed. (1981). Great Basin Naturalist Memoirs. Vol. 5. Brigham Young University.
  - Brimhall, Willis H.; Merritt, Lavere B. "Geology of Utah Lake: Implications for Resource Management". In Wood (1981).
  - Fuhriman, Dean K.; Merritt, Lavere B.; Miller, A. Woodruff; Stock, Harold S. "Hydrology and Water Quality of Utah Lake". In Wood (1981).
  - Heckman, Richard A.; Thompson, Charles W.; White, David A. "Fishes of Utah Lake". In Wood (1981).
  - Jackson, Richard H.; Stevens, Dale J. "Physical and Cultural Environment of Utah Lake and Adjacent Areas". In Wood (1981).
  - Pritchett, Clyde L.; Frost, Herbert H.; Tanner, Wilmer W. "Terrestrial Vertebrates in the Environs of Utah Lake". In Wood (1981). | ref=CITEREFTerrestrial_Vertebrates_in_the_Environs_of_Utah_Lake1981

=== PDF documents ===
- 12-Month_Finding_on_a_Petition_To_List_the_Bonneville_Cutthroat_Trout_as_Threatened_or_Endangered (PDF), U.S. Fish and Wildlife Service, September 9, 2008
- 90-Day_Finding_on_a_Petition_To_List_the_Least_Chub (PDF), U.S. Fish and Wildlife Service, October 15, 2008
- Carp In Utah Lake Impacting Ecosystem (PDF), June Sucker Recovery Implementation Program, June 2004, archived from the original (PDF) on July 19, 2011
- Final_Rule_Determining_the_June_Sucker (PDF), U.S. Fish and Wildlife Service, March 31, 1986
- Currey, Donald R.; Atwood, Genevieve; Mabey, Don R. (May 1984), Major Levels of Great Salt Lake and Lake Bonneville (PDF), State of Utah, Department of Natural Resources, archived from the original (PDF) on November 18, 2016
- Utah Lake and Jordan River water rights and management plan (PDF), Salt Lake City, 1989, archived from the original (PDF) on March 16, 2011
- Horns, Daniel (May 2005), Utah Lake Comprehensive Management Plan Resource Document (PDF), Utah Division of Forestry, Fire & State Lands, archived from the original (PDF) on 2009-09-18
- Utah Lake TMDL: Pollutant Loading Assessment and Designated Beneficial Use Impairment Assessment (PDF), State of Utah Division of Water Quality, August 2007, archived from the original (PDF) on 2010-08-19
