= National Register of Historic Places listings in Davis County, Utah =

Location of Davis County in Utah

This is a list of the National Register of Historic Places listings in Davis County, Utah.

This is intended to be a complete list of the properties and districts on the National Register of Historic Places in Davis County, Utah, United States. Latitude and longitude coordinates are provided for many National Register properties and districts; these locations may be seen together in a map.

There are 70 properties and districts listed on the National Register in the county. Two other sites in the county were once listed, but have since been removed.

This National Park Service list is complete through NPS recent listings posted July 10, 2026.

== Current listings ==
	Name on the Register	Image	Date listed	Location	City or town	Description
1	Joseph Adams House	Joseph Adams House	February 17, 1978 (#78002655)	300 N. Adamswood Rd. 41°03′55″N 111°56′42″W	Layton	
2	James and Hannah Atkinson House	James and Hannah Atkinson House	July 15, 1999 (#99000847)	1510 S. 1100 West; 40°52′29″N 111°54′40″W	Woods Cross	
3	Barnard-Garn-Barber House	Barnard-Garn-Barber House	November 17, 1997 (#97001309)	1198 N. Main St. 40°55′54″N 111°52′43″W	Centerville	
4	John George Moroni Barnes House	John George Moroni Barnes House	February 11, 1982 (#82004120)	42 W. Center St. 41°02′07″N 111°56′20″W	Kaysville	
5	John R. Barnes House	John R. Barnes House	July 23, 1982 (#82004121)	10 S. 100 West; 41°02′05″N 111°56′23″W	Kaysville	
6	Henry Blood House	Henry Blood House	April 29, 1980 (#80003897)	95 S. 300 West; 41°02′01″N 111°56′35″W	Kaysville	Home of Henry H. Blood, former Governor of Utah.
7	Bountiful Historic District	Bountiful Historic District	October 26, 2005 (#05001194)	Roughly bounded by 200 W., 500 S., 400 E., and 400 N. 40°53′21″N 111°52′42″W	Bountiful	
8	Bountiful Tabernacle	Bountiful Tabernacle	January 1, 1976 (#76001813)	Main and Center Sts. 40°53′21″N 111°52′43″W	Bountiful	
9	Thomas and Margaret Brandon House	Thomas and Margaret Brandon House	November 17, 1997 (#97001310)	185 E. Center St. 40°55′06″N 111°52′34″W	Centerville	
10	Building 225-Airplane Repair Hangar		December 16, 2024 (#100011169)	5875 Southgate Avenue; 41°07′06″N 111°58′37″W	Hill Air Force Base	Built in 1942, one of only five barrel vault-style United States Air Force buildings known to still exist
11	Burns-Wood House		March 14, 2025 (#100011518)	231 East 100 North; 40°58′56″N 111°52′57″W	Farmington	
12	William Capener House	William Capener House	January 5, 1984 (#84002172)	252 N. 400 East; 40°55′12″N 111°52′16″W	Centerville	
13	Henry and Leatha Chaffin House		March 17, 2025 (#100011530)	189 North 100 East; 40°59′01″N 111°53′08″W	Farmington	
14	Leroy and Alice Cheney House	Leroy and Alice Cheney House	July 12, 2021 (#100006718)	676 North Main St. 40°55′30″N 111°52′44″W	Centerville	
15	Clark Lane Historic District	Clark Lane Historic District	October 7, 1994 (#94001208)	207-399 W. State and 33 N. 200 West; 40°58′50″N 111°53′36″W	Farmington	
16	Clinton LDS Ward Meetinghouse		July 17, 2026 (#100013227)	1387 W 1800 North; 41°08′23″N 112°03′10″W	Clinton	
17	Osmyn and Emily Deuel House	Osmyn and Emily Deuel House	November 17, 1997 (#97001311)	271 S. 200 East; 40°54′53″N 111°52′31″W	Centerville	
18	John, Harriet, and Eliza Jennett Duncan House	John, Harriet, and Eliza Jennett Duncan House	November 17, 1997 (#97001312)	445 N. 400 East; 40°55′19″N 111°52′21″W	Centerville	
19	James and Jane Eldredge House	James and Jane Eldredge House	June 10, 2005 (#05000595)	564 W. 400 North; 40°53′40″N 111°53′35″W	West Bountiful	
20	Farmer's Union Building	Farmer's Union Building	November 30, 1978 (#78002656)	12 S. Main St. 41°03′38″N 111°57′54″W	Layton	
21	Farmington Main Street Historic District	Farmington Main Street Historic District	October 20, 2011 (#11000756)	Approximately Main St. from 200 South to 600 North, along 600 North to Park Lane and 100 North from Main St to 100 West; 40°58′50″N 111°53′15″W	Farmington	
22	Farmington Tithing Office	Farmington Tithing Office	March 28, 1985 (#85000686)	110 N. Main St. 40°58′56″N 111°53′14″W	Farmington	
23	Fielding Garr Ranch	Fielding Garr Ranch	January 21, 1983 (#83004402)	Off State Route 127; 40°55′31″N 112°09′59″W	Antelope Island	
24	First National Bank of Layton	First National Bank of Layton	April 5, 2006 (#06000232)	50 W. Gentile St. 41°03′38″N 111°57′57″W	Layton	
25	Joseph N. and Algie Ford House	Joseph N. and Algie Ford House	November 18, 2005 (#05001289)	1394 N. Main St. 40°56′12″N 111°52′39″W	Centerville	
26	Ford-Rigby House	Ford-Rigby House	November 17, 1997 (#97001313)	1592 N. Main St. 40°56′27″N 111°52′47″W	Centerville	
27	James Green House	James Green House	February 11, 1982 (#82004118)	206 N. 100 East; 40°53′30″N 111°52′38″W	Bountiful	
28	Hector C. Haight House	Hector C. Haight House	May 17, 1985 (#85001141)	208 N. Main St. 40°59′03″N 111°53′11″W	Farmington	
29	Thomas and Caroline Harris House	Thomas and Caroline Harris House	June 11, 1998 (#98000639)	275 S. 200 East; 40°54′54″N 111°52′30″W	Centerville	
30	Harris-Tingey House	Harris-Tingey House	November 17, 1997 (#97001314)	269 E. Center St. 40°55′03″N 111°52′28″W	Centerville	
31	Joseph and Ann Hill Cabin	Joseph and Ann Hill Cabin	December 4, 2015 (#15000130)	~~2133 W. 1000 South~~; 41°03′55″N 111°57′45″W	Layton	Moved to Layton Commons Park.
32	Holland-Smith-Brown House	Holland-Smith-Brown House	November 17, 1997 (#97001315)	19 S. 200 East; 40°55′01″N 111°52′31″W	Centerville	
33	Kaysville City Hall	Kaysville City Hall	September 30, 2019 (#100004476)	44 N. Main St. 41°02′07″N 111°56′19″W	Kaysville	
34	Kilbourn-Leak House	Kilbourn-Leak House	November 17, 1997 (#97001316)	170 N. 200 East; 40°55′10″N 111°52′31″W	Centerville	
35	George Quincy Knowlton House	George Quincy Knowlton House	April 17, 1995 (#95000416)	93 E. 400 North; 40°59′14″N 111°53′09″W	Farmington	
36	Lagoon Carousel	Lagoon Carousel	October 24, 2012 (#12000883)	375 N. Lagoon Dr. 40°59′05″N 111°53′38″W	Farmington	Built in 1913, this hand carved Herschell-Spillman carousel has been at Lagoon Amusement Park since 1918.
37	Lagoon Flying Scooter	Lagoon Flying Scooter	October 24, 2012 (#12000884)	375 N. Lagoon Dr. 40°59′13″N 111°53′36″W	Farmington	A Bisch-Rocco Amusement Company Flying Scooters ride at Lagoon Amusement Park. Installed in 1941, it is currently known as the Flying Aces.
38	Lagoon Roller Coaster	Lagoon Roller Coaster	October 24, 2012 (#12000885)	375 N. Lagoon Dr. 40°59′05″N 111°53′42″W	Farmington	The 7th oldest roller coaster in the world, at Lagoon Amusement Park since 1921
39	Layton Oregon Short Line Railroad Station	Layton Oregon Short Line Railroad Station	January 18, 2018 (#100001979)	200 S Main St. 41°03′24″N 111°57′52″W	Layton	Railroad station built alongside the Oregon Short Line Railroad tracks in 1912. Used by the railroad until the 1960s, and later sold then moved 1,200 feet to the south. The building has housed several businesses since it was vacated by the railroad.
40	George W. Layton House	George W. Layton House	July 23, 1982 (#82004122)	2767 W. Gentile St. 41°03′35″N 112°01′05″W	Layton	Red brick house with elaborate trim, designed by William Allen. Now a wedding venue.
41	John Henry Layton House	John Henry Layton House	February 11, 1982 (#82004123)	683 W. Gentile St. 41°03′35″N 111°58′44″W	Layton	Also designed by William Allen, with reversed plan to George W. Layton House
42	Leonard–Taylor House	Leonard–Taylor House	September 7, 2023 (#100009316)	94 East 500 North; 40°59′19″N 111°53′09″W	Farmington	
43	William H. and Helen Miller House		March 17, 2025 (#100011544)	147 North 100 East; 40°58′58″N 111°53′08″W	Farmington	
44	Mills-Hancock House	Mills-Hancock House	February 21, 2007 (#07000077)	571 S. 400 West; 40°55′06″N 111°52′52″W	Centerville	
45	Nathan and Rebecca Cherry and Eliza Ford Porter Farmstead	Nathan and Rebecca Cherry and Eliza Ford Porter Farmstead	November 17, 1997 (#97001317)	370 W. 400 South; 40°54′48″N 111°53′05″W	Centerville	
46	Nathan T. and Anna Porter House	Nathan T. and Anna Porter House	January 21, 2004 (#03001482)	224 S. 210 West; 40°54′55″N 111°52′55″W	Centerville	
47	Melvin Harley Randall House	Melvin Harley Randall House	June 20, 1980 (#80003896)	390 E. Porter Lane; 40°54′46″N 111°52′19″W	Centerville	
48	Rich-Steeper House	Rich-Steeper House	November 17, 1997 (#97001318)	415 S. Main St. 40°54′46″N 111°52′42″W	Centerville	
49	Richards House	Richards House	December 23, 1977 (#77001303)	386 N. 100 East; 40°59′12″N 111°53′02″W	Farmington	
50	Ron's Phillips 66 Service Station	Ron's Phillips 66 Service Station	March 26, 2018 (#100002273)	278 N Main St. 40°55′12″N 111°52′44″W	Centerville	
51	Salt Lake South East and North West Base Monuments (Salt Lake Base Line)	Salt Lake South East and North West Base Monuments (Salt Lake Base Line)	January 18, 2018 (#100001980)	1002 S. 3200 West & 209 S. 4500 West; 41°04′29″N 112°01′34″W	Layton and West Point	
52	B.H., Louisa Smith and Cecilia Dibble Roberts House	B.H., Louisa Smith and Cecilia Dibble Roberts House	November 17, 1997 (#97001319)	315 S. 300 East; 40°54′51″N 111°52′21″W	Centerville	Home of B. H. Roberts
53	Jesse Wells and Miriam Smith Hous		March 17, 2025 (#100011546)	93 East 200 North; 40°59′02″N 111°53′08″W	Farmington	
54	Thomas J. and Amanda N. Smith House	Thomas J. and Amanda N. Smith House	February 2, 2006 (#05001632)	472 N. Main St. 41°02′35″N 111°56′48″W	Kaysville	
55	Smith-Larsen House	Smith-Larsen House	November 17, 1997 (#97001320)	280 E. Center St. 40°54′59″N 111°52′27″W	Centerville	
56	Smoot Dairy Farmhouse	Smoot Dairy Farmhouse	March 22, 2016 (#16000123)	1697 N. Main St. 40°56′31″N 111°52′49″W	Centerville	
57	Stayner-Steed House	Stayner-Steed House	August 2, 1999 (#99000846)	79 S. 100 East; 40°58′45″N 111°53′04″W	Farmington	
58	LeConte Stewart House	LeConte Stewart House	June 28, 1996 (#96000721)	172 W. 100 South; 41°02′03″N 111°56′28″W	Kaysville	
59	William Henry and Mary Streeper House	William Henry and Mary Streeper House	November 17, 1997 (#97001321)	1020 N. Main St. 40°55′46″N 111°52′50″W	Centerville	
60	John W., Janet (Nettie), and May Rich Taylor House	John W., Janet (Nettie), and May Rich Taylor House	October 30, 1997 (#97001325)	49 E. 500 North; 40°59′19″N 111°53′11″W	Farmington	
61	Thurston-Chase Cabin	Thurston-Chase Cabin	November 17, 1997 (#97001322)	975 N. Main St. 40°55′43″N 111°52′45″W	Centerville	
62	Thomas Tingey House	Thomas Tingey House	July 28, 1983 (#83004401)	20 N. 300 East; 40°55′03″N 111°52′23″W	Centerville	
63	Elias and Lucy Van Fleet House		March 17, 2025 (#100011532)	93 East 300 North; 40°59′08″N 111°53′09″W	Farmington	
64	Elias and Mary Ann Van Fleet House		March 17, 2025 (#100011545)	463 North 100 East; 40°59′17″N 111°53′08″W	Farmington	
65	VanFleet Hotel	VanFleet Hotel	December 19, 1991 (#91001819)	88 E. State St. 40°58′48″N 111°53′05″W	Farmington	
66	Franklin and Amelia Walton House	Franklin and Amelia Walton House	November 17, 1997 (#97001323)	96 W. 280 South; 40°54′53″N 111°52′50″W	Centerville	
67	John and Sarah Jane Wayman House	John and Sarah Jane Wayman House	January 7, 2015 (#14001136)	240 E. 300 South; 40°54′53″N 111°52′27″W	Centerville	
68	West Bountiful Historic District	West Bountiful Historic District	June 18, 2004 (#03000158)	800 West (Onion St.) from 400 North to roughly 1350 North (both sides); 40°53′51″N 111°54′05″W	West Bountiful	
69	Thomas and Elizabeth Mills Whitaker House	Thomas and Elizabeth Mills Whitaker House	March 28, 1996 (#96000316)	168 N. Main St. 40°55′08″N 111°52′43″W	Centerville	
70	James D. Wilcox House	James D. Wilcox House	November 26, 1985 (#85003051)	93 E. 100 North; 40°58′56″N 111°53′05″W	Farmington	

== Former listings ==
	Name on the Register	Image	Date listed	Date removed	Location	City or town	Description
1	Townsend–Palmer House		August 4, 1982 (#82004119)	December 7, 1989	515 S. 200 West	Bountiful	
2	Young Men's Hall – Tingey House	Young Men's Hall – Tingey House	November 17, 1997 (#97001324)	June 15, 2015	85 S. 300 East; 40°54′59″N 111°52′21″W	Centerville	

== See also ==
- List of National Historic Landmarks in Utah
- National Register of Historic Places listings in Utah
