= Holland House (disambiguation) =

Holland House is a 17th-century great house in Kensington, London.

Holland House may also refer to:

== Houses and other structures ==
=== Australia ===
- "Holland House", Turretfield, founded by Richard Holland (horse breeder)

=== United Kingdom ===
- Little Holland House, the dower house of Holland House, where a salon was held
- Holland House, Cardiff, now a hotel operated by Mercure Hotels
- Holland House, a retreat and meeting venue in Cropthorne, Wiltshire
- Holland House, Kingsgate, country house in Kent, built by the first Baron Holland
- Holland House, Papa Westray, Orkney Islands, Scotland
- Holland House School, an independent preparatory school in Edgware, London

=== United States ===
- Thomas Holland House, Hillsboro, Alabama, listed on the National Register of Historic Places (NRHP) in Lawrence County, Alabama
- Holland House (Denver, Colorado), a Denver Landmark
- Benjamin Franklin Holland House, Bartow, Florida, NRHP-listed
- Holland House (Atlanta), Atlanta, Georgia – built in 1842 it was the oldest house in Atlanta still standing in the early 1900s
- Teasley–Holland House, Hartwell, Georgia, listed on the NRHP in Hart County
- Dr. Madison Monroe Holland House, Statesboro, Georgia, NRHP-listed in Bulloch County
- Ora Holland House, Dubuque, Iowa, NRHP-listed in Dubuque County
- Holland–Drew House, Lewiston, Maine, NRHP-listed
- Captain Holland House, Lewiston, Maine, NRHP-listed
- Holland–Towne House, Petersham, Massachusetts, NRHP-listed
- Ward–Holland House, Marine City, Michigan, NRHP-listed in St. Clair County
- McPherson–Holland House, Glendale, Missouri, listed on the NRHP in St. Louis County
- 10 Rockefeller Plaza, New York, New York, formerly referred to as "Holland House"
- Holland House (New York City)
- Holland–Summers House, Harmony, North Carolina, NRHP-listed in Iredell County
- Tull–Worth–Holland Farm, Kinston, North Carolina, NRHP-listed in Lenoir County
- Russ and Holland Snow Houses, Brecksville, Ohio, listed on the NRHP in Cuyahoga County
- George Holland House, Gettysburg, South Dakota, listed on the NRHP in Potter County
- William Holland Jr. House, Jackson, Tennessee, listed on the NRHP in Madison County
- Holland–Smith–Brown House, Centerville, Utah, listed on the NRHP in Davis County
- Burwell–Holland House, Glade Hill, Virginia, NRHP-listed in Franklin County
- Holland–Duncan House, Moneta, Virginia, NRHP-listed in Franklin County
- Holland House (Buffalo, Wyoming), listed on the NRHP in Johnson County
- Norris-Holland-Hare House, Holly Springs, North Carolina

== Consumer brands ==
- Holland House, a brand of cooking wines and vinegars belonging to Mizkan
- Holland House, a furniture-making subsidiary of H. T. Hackney Company

== See also ==
- Holland Hall (disambiguation)
