= Richards House =

Richards House may refer to:

in the United States

(by state, then city/town)

- Richards Mansion (Wheat Ridge, Colorado), listed on the National Register of Historic Places (NRHP) in Jefferson County, Colorado
- Richards Mansion (Georgetown, Delaware), NRHP-listed
- Richards-Hamm House, Glendale, Kentucky, listed on the NRHP in Hardin County, Kentucky
- Richards-Murray House, Glendale, Kentucky, listed on the NRHP in Hardin County, Kentucky
- Laura Richards House, Gardiner, Maine, listed on the NRHP in Kennebec County, Maine
- Thomas Richards House, Rising Sun, Maryland, NRHP-listed
- Theodore W. Richards House, Cambridge, Massachusetts, NRHP-listed
- Ellen Swallow Richards House, Jamaica Plain, Boston Massachusetts, NRHP-listed
- James Lorin Richards House, Newton, Massachusetts, NRHP-listed
- Alfred H. Richards House, Quincy, Massachusetts, NRHP-listed
- Claflin-Richards House, Wenham, Massachusetts, NRHP-listed
- Oconee Station and Richards House, Walhalla, South Carolina, NRHP-listed
- Richards Cabins, Faith, South Dakota, listed on the National Register of Historic Places in Perkins County, South Dakota
- Newton Copeland Richards House, Memphis, Tennessee, listed on the NRHP in Shelby County, Tennessee
- Richards-Sewall House, Urbana, Ohio, NRHP-listed
- Richards House (Farmington, Utah), listed on the National Register of Historic Places in Davis County, Utah
- Zalmon Richards House, Washington, D.C., NRHP-listed

== See also ==
- Richards Mansion (disambiguation)
