= Charles Duncan =

Charles Duncan may refer to:

== Politics and law ==
- Charles T. Duncan (1838–1915), American lawyer and Virginia state judge
- Charles Duncan (politician) (1865–1933), British politician and trade unionist
- Charles Duncan Jr. (1926–2022), U.S. Secretary of Energy under President Jimmy Carter

== Others ==
- Charles Duncan (captain) (fl. 1786–1789), British ship captain and maritime fur trader
- Charles Duncan (stonemason) (1823–1891), Scottish-born Utah stonemason
- Charles Duncan (artist) (1887–1970), American avant-garde painter
- Charlie Duncan (1889–?), Scottish footballer
- Charles Stafford Duncan (1892–1952), American painter
- Charles K. Duncan (1911–1994), United States Navy admiral
- Charles "Scottie" Duncan (fl. 1937–1940), American baseball player
- Charles Duncan (British Army soldier) (1920–1943), British soldier posthumously awarded the George Cross
