= Porter House =

Porter House, Porter Estate, or Porter Cabin may refer to:

- Porter-French House, in Orange, California, listed on the NRHP in California
- John Porter House, 777 Pearl Street, Denver, Colorado, a Denver Landmark
- Porter House (Denver, Colorado), a Denver Landmark
- Dr. J. Porter House, in Southington, Connecticut
- Thomas V. Porter House, in Jacksonville, Florida
- Dr. Joseph Y. Porter House, in Key West, Florida
- Porter-York House, in Clarkesville, Georgia, listed on the NRHP in Georgia
- Gene Stratton-Porter Cabin (Geneva, Indiana)
- Gene Stratton-Porter Cabin (Rome City, Indiana)
- Ellsworth-Porter House, in Decorah, Iowa
- Porter-Rhynsburger House, in Pella, Iowa
- Porter-Todd House, in Louisville, Kentucky
- Bradford Porter House, in Nebo, Kentucky, listed on the NRHP in Kentucky
- Porter-Bell-Brackley Estate, in Strong, Maine
- Porter–Phelps–Huntington House, in Hadley, Massachusetts
- John J. and Eva Reynier Porter Estate, in South Arm Township, Michigan
- Porter-Crawford House, in Meridian, Mississippi
- Porter House (Raymond, Mississippi)
- Porter-Thomsen House, in Omaha, Nebraska, listed on the NRHP in Nebraska
- General Porter House, in Portsmouth, New Hampshire
- Peck-Porter House, in Walpole, New Hampshire
- Rev. Dr. Elbert S. Porter House, in Claverack, New York
- Porter House New York, a steakhouse in New York City
- Porter House (Syracuse, New York)
- Porter Houses and Armstrong Kitchen, in Whitakers, North Carolina
- Porter-Aue House, in Clinton, Ohio, listed on the NRHP in Ohio
- Orin Porter House, in Hudson, Ohio, listed on the NRHP in Ohio
- Porter-Brasfield House, in Shedd, Oregon, listed on the NRHP in Oregon
- Porter-Leath, in Memphis, Tennessee
- Porter House (Paris, Tennessee), in Paris, Tennessee
- Stephen Porter House, in Rockford, Tennessee, listed on the NRHP in Tennessee
- William Sidney Porter House, in Austin, Texas
- Katherine Anne Porter House, in Kyle, Texas
- Nathan T. and Anna Porter House, in Centerville, Utah
- Walworth D. Porter Duplex Residence in Baraboo, Wisconsin

== See also ==
- Porterhouse (disambiguation)
