= Gene Stratton-Porter Cabin =

Gene Stratton Porter Cabin may refer to:

- Gene Stratton Porter Cabin (Geneva, Indiana), listed on the National Register of Historic Places in Adams County, Indiana
- Gene Stratton-Porter Cabin (Rome City, Indiana), listed on the National Register of Historic Places in Noble County, Indiana

== See also ==
- Porter House (disambiguation)
