= Richards Mansion =

Richards Mansion may refer to:

- Richards Mansion (Wheat Ridge, Colorado), listed on the National Register of Historic Places in Jefferson County, Colorado
- Richards Mansion (Georgetown, Delaware), listed on the National Register of Historic Places in Sussex County, Delaware

== See also ==
- Richards House (disambiguation)
