= Charles Duncan (stonemason) =

Charles Duncan (1823 – 1891) was a Scottish-born stonemason in Utah. He worked on his own and with sons, sometimes known as Charles Duncan and Sons, building numerous stone houses and culverts around Davis County, Utah, and he contributed to the construction of the Salt Lake Temple.

With son John Samuel Duncan, he built the John, Harriet, and Eliza Jennett Duncan House in Centerville, Utah around 1873. It is one of a number of his works listed on the National Register of Historic Places.

Duncan helped build the Salt Lake Temple during the portion of its construction from 1863 to 1867.

Duncan was born in 1823 in Dysart, Fifeshire, Scotland and in 1844 he married Margaret Bowman; they lived in Dysart where Charles was employed as a stone cutter and rock mason.

The family came from Liverpool to New Orleans by the January to March 1852 voyage of the ship Kennebec; records show Duncans with first names Charles, Margaret, Isabell, Janet, another Margaret, were on board.

== Works ==
- Osmyn and Emily Deuel House, 271 South 200 East Centerville, UT (Duncan, Charles, and Sons), NRHP-listed
- John, Harriet, and Eliza Jennett Duncan House (c.1873), 445 North 400 East Centerville, UT Duncan, Charles and John), NRHP-listed
- Harris--Tingey House, 269 E. Center St. Centerville, UT Duncan, Charles), NRHP-listed
- Kilbourn--Leak House, 170 North 200 East Centerville, UT Duncan, Charles, and Sons), NRHP-listed
- B.H. Roberts Louisa Smith and Cecilia Dibble, 315 South 300 East Centerville, UT Duncan, Charles, and Sons), NRHP-listed
- William Henry and Mary Streeper House, 1020 N. Main St. Centerville, UT Duncan, Charles), NRHP-listed
- Thomas and Elizabeth Mills Whitaker House, 168 N. Main St. Centerville, UT Duncan, Charles, and Sons), NRHP-listed
- Young Men's Hall--Tingey House, 85 South 300 East Centerville, UT Duncan, Charles E., and Sons), NRHP-listed
