= Holland Hall =

Holland Hall may refer to

- One of the University of Exeter Halls of Residence
- Holland Hall at the University of Pittsburgh
- Holland Hall (Tulsa, Oklahoma), an independent K-12 school
- Holland Hall Gymnasium, the home basketball court used by Hampton University until 1993

== See also ==
- Holland House (disambiguation)
