= Lagoon Carousel =

United States historic place

- U.S. National Register of Historic Places
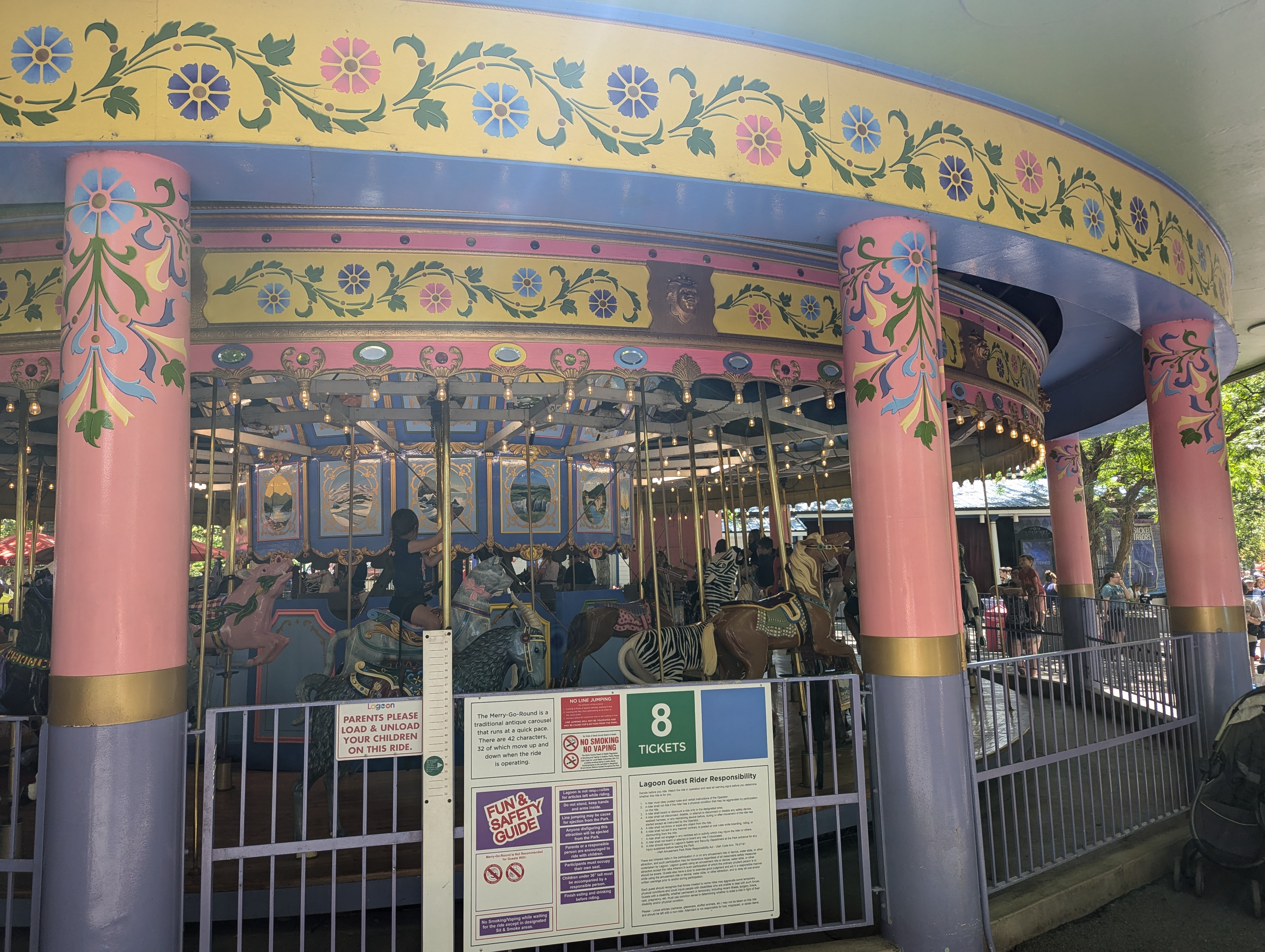
- Location: Farmington, Utah
- Coordinates: 40.9849°N 111.8939°W
- Built: c. 1913
- NRHP reference No.: 12000883
- Added to NRHP: October 24, 2012

The Lagoon Carousel is an antique carousel at Lagoon amusement park in Farmington, Utah. It was built around 1913, and was added to the National Register of Historic Places on October 24, 2012, alongside the Lagoon Roller Coaster and the Lagoon Flying Scooter.

== See also ==
- Amusement rides on the National Register of Historic Places
- National Register of Historic Places listings in Davis County, Utah
