= Roller Coaster (Lagoon) =

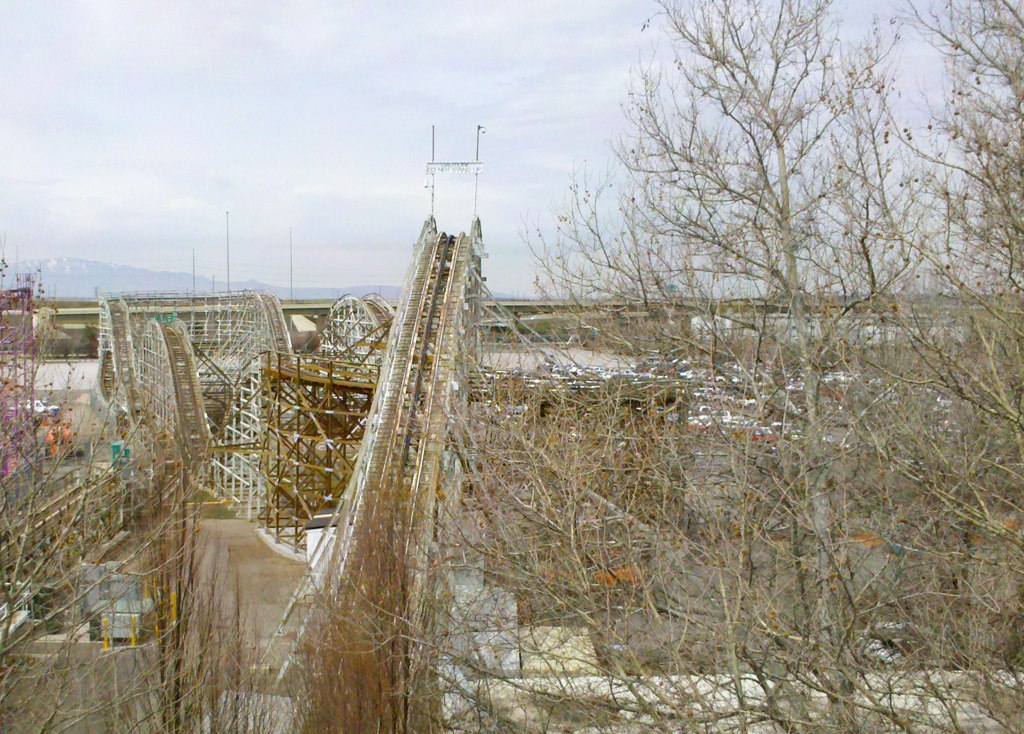
- Roller Coaster as viewed from the Sky Ride

Lagoon Amusement Park
- Location: Lagoon Amusement Park
- Coordinates: 40.984861°N 111.895137°W
- Status: Operating
- Opening date: July 15, 1921; 105 years ago

General statistics
- Type: Wood
- Designer: John A. Miller
- Track layout: Double out-and-back
- Lift/launch system: Chain lift hill
- Height: 18.9 m (62 ft)
- Length: 762 m (2,500 ft)
- Speed: 45 mph (72 km/h)
- Inversions: 0
- Height restriction: 46 in (117 cm)
- Trains: 2 trains with 12 cars; riders arranged 2 across in a single row for a total of 24 riders per train
- Roller Coaster at RCDB

- Lagoon Roller Coaster
- U.S. National Register of Historic Places
- Location within Utah
- Location: Farmington, Utah
- MPS: Lagoon Amusement Park, Farmington, Utah MPS
- NRHP reference No.: 12000883
- Added to NRHP: October 24, 2012

Roller Coaster is a wooden roller coaster located at Lagoon Amusement Park in Farmington, Utah. Built in 1921 and operating ever since, Roller Coaster is the fifth oldest operating roller coaster in the world, the third oldest operating in the United States, and the oldest at Lagoon.

== History ==
Roller Coaster was designed by John A. Miller and opened in 1921. In 1953, a fire that spread across the west side of the Midway damaged the coaster, meaning the station and lift hill had to be rebuilt. Over the years it has received computer upgrades and new trains. In 2005, it became an American Coaster Enthusiasts (ACE) Roller Coaster Landmark. In October 2012, it was listed on the National Register of Historic Places.

In early 2018, new Millennium Flyer trains from Great Coasters International (GCI) replaced the former Philadelphia Toboggan Coasters (PTC) trains. The station was also reconfigured, with the entrance and exit swapped.

== Layout ==
Roller Coaster starts with a turn out of the station where it enters the lift hill. The train rises 60 feet (18 m), and then plunges down the first hill, and up the next and down again around the west turn, into several more series of hills which gradually get smaller. It goes through two more turns before returning to the station.

== Incidents ==
- In 1934, 20-year-old Henry Howe of Ogden, Utah fell to his death as he attempted to stand up when the train was on its highest hill. Howe hit a number of support trestles on the way down.
- In 1946, James Young Hess was struck by the train as he was working on scaffolding on the ride. Hess suffered skull, leg and arm fractures, as well as internal injuries, before dying on September 1, 1946.
- In 1989, a 13-year-old girl slipped out from under the restraint and fell 35 feet to her death. She died at the scene. Lagoon made safety adjustments to the trains before reopening the ride, and new restraints were added the following year.

== See also ==
- Amusement rides on the National Register of Historic Places
- Lagoon Carousel
- Lagoon Flying Scooter
- National Register of Historic Places listings in Davis County, Utah
