= Lagoon Flying Scooter =

United States historic place

- U.S. National Register of Historic Places
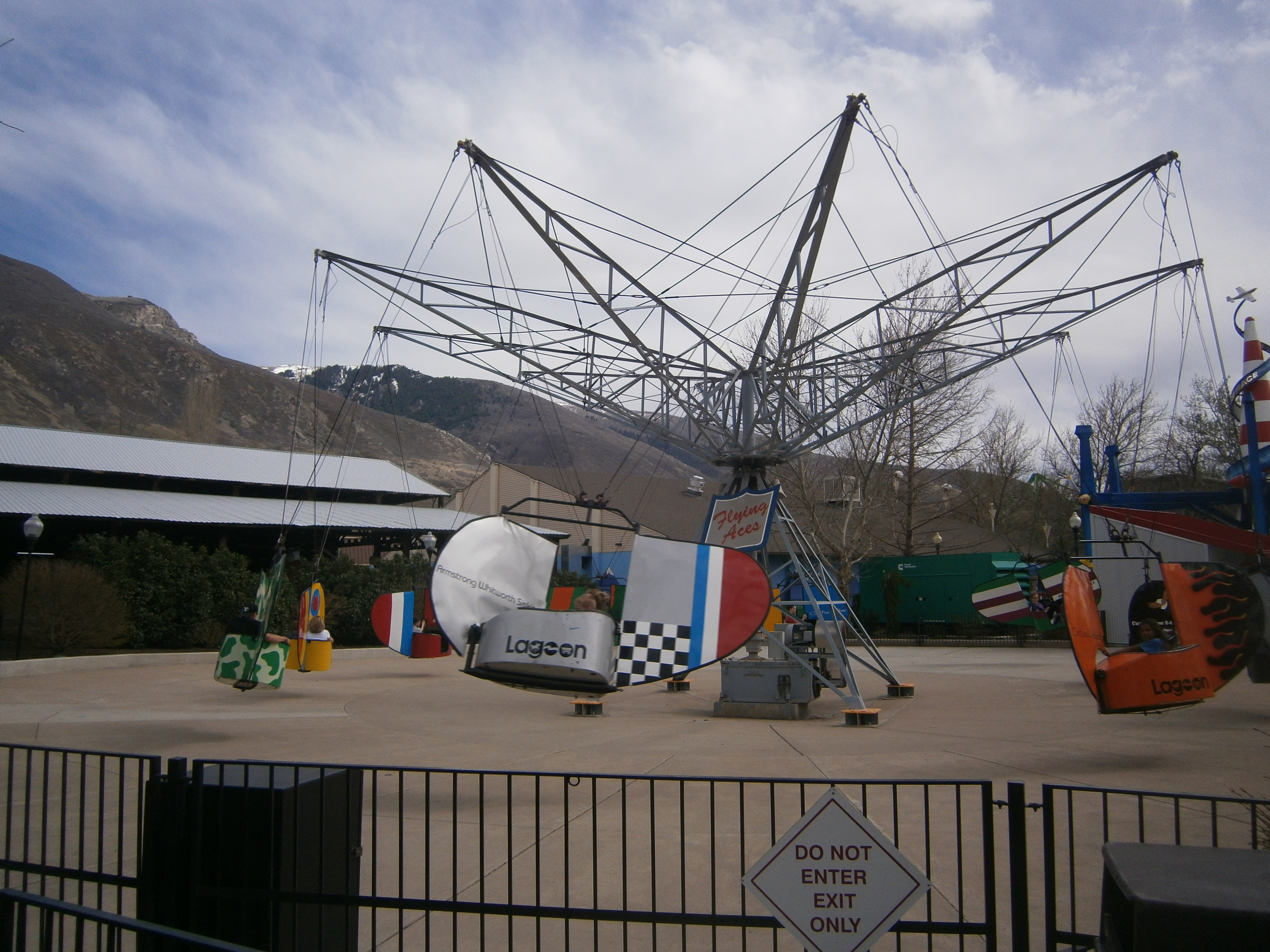
- Location: Farmington, Utah
- Coordinates: 40.9871°N 111.8933°W
- Built: 1941
- Architect: Bisch-Rocco Company
- NRHP reference No.: 12000884
- Added to NRHP: October 24, 2012

The Lagoon Flying Scooter (also known as Flying Aces) is a historic amusement ride at Lagoon amusement park in Farmington, Utah. It was built in 1941 by Bisch-Rocco Company, and is a Flying Scooter. It was added to the National Register of Historic Places on October 24, 2012, alongside the Lagoon Carousel and the Lagoon Roller Coaster.

== See also ==
- Amusement rides on the National Register of Historic Places
- National Register of Historic Places listings in Davis County, Utah
