= Ora Holland House =

Historic house in Iowa, United States

- U.S. National Register of Historic Places
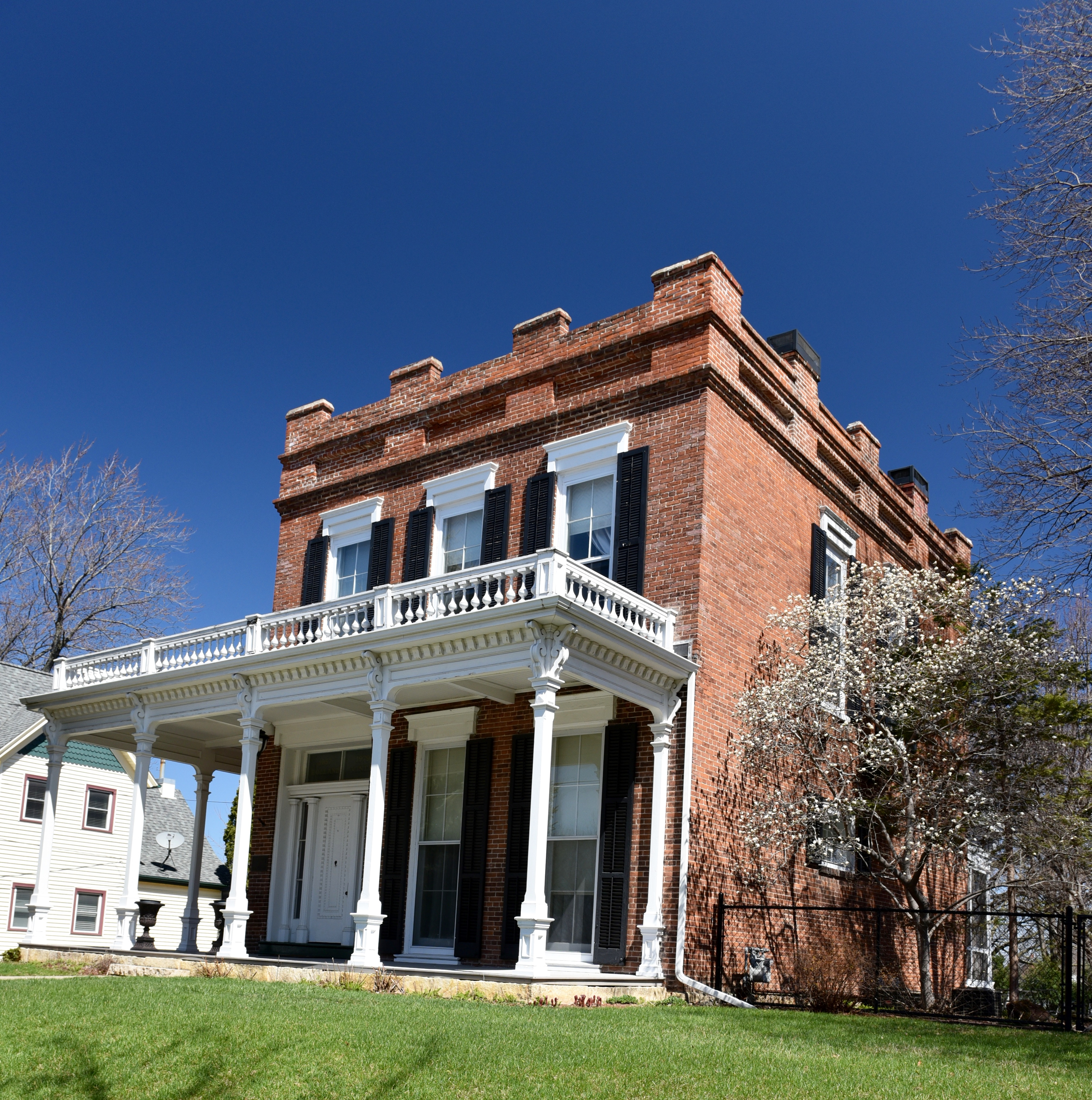

- Location within Iowa Location within the United States
- Location: 1296 Mt. Pleasant St. Dubuque, Iowa
- Coordinates: 42°30′01.6″N 90°41′04.2″W
- Area: less than one acre
- Built: 1855-1857
- Architect: Ora Holland
- Architectural style: Federal
- NRHP reference No.: 86001613
- Added to NRHP: August 14, 1986

The Ora Holland House, also known as the Holland-Viner House, is a historic building located in Dubuque, Iowa, United States. Holland was a contractor-builder who came to Dubuque from Vermont in 1846 by way of Jacksonville, Illinois where he learned his trade. He built his house over a period of two years because of other projects he was involved with, completing construction in 1857. Holland acquired the property from the Langworthy brothers, who were the first prominent citizens of Dubuque to settle above the bluff. The two-story brick residence is reminiscent of the Federal style. The entry, heavy window cornices and parapets reflect the Greek Revival style. The house was listed on the National Register of Historic Places in 1986.
