= Ron's Phillips 66 Service Station =

- U.S. National Register of Historic Places
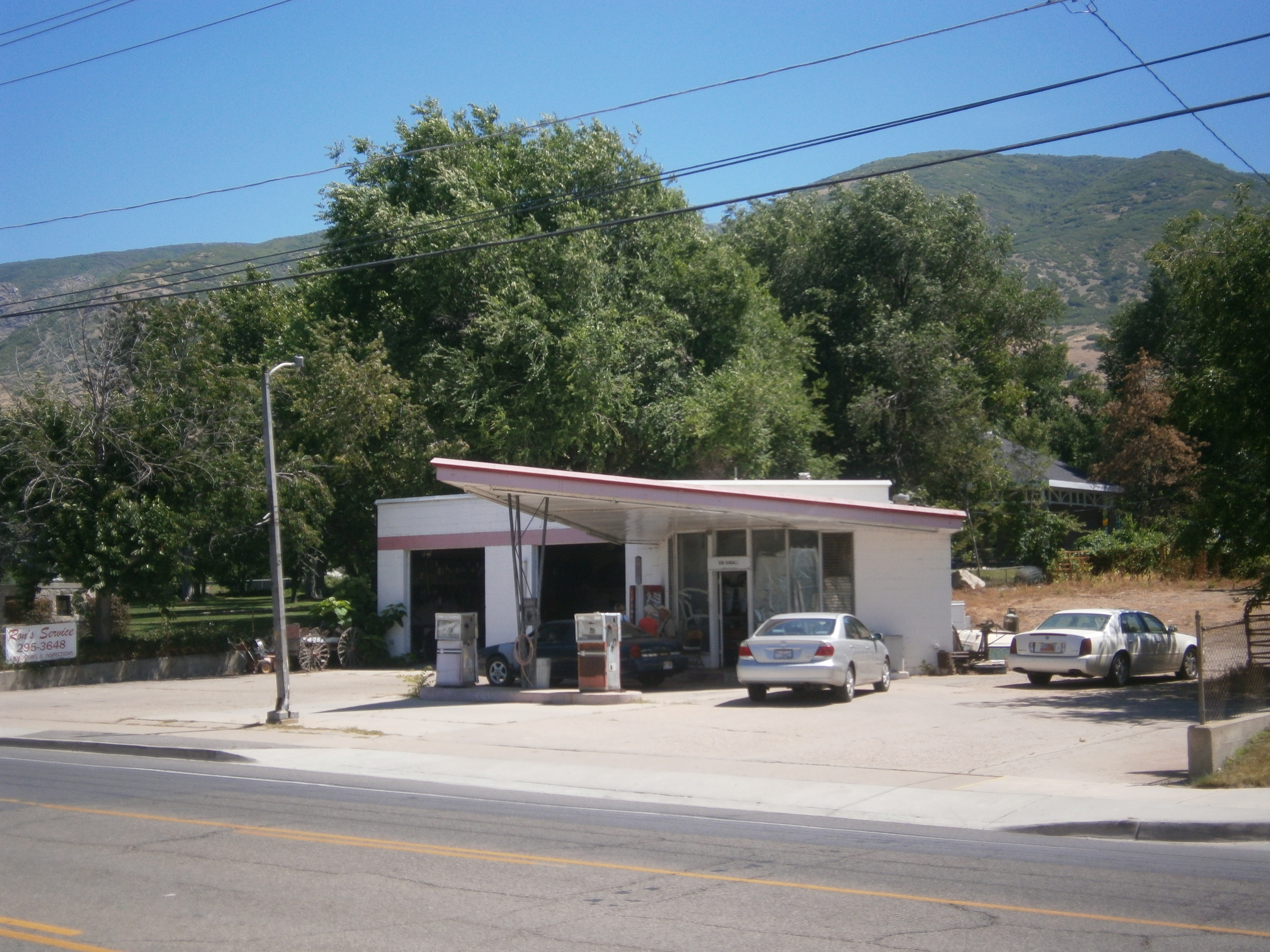

- Location within Utah Location within the United States
- Location: 278 N. Main St., Centerville, Utah
- Coordinates: 40°55′12″N 111°52′44″W
- Built: 1960
- NRHP reference No.: 100002273
- Added to NRHP: March 26, 2018

The Ron's Phillips 66 Service Station, at 278 N. Main St. in Centerville, Utah, was listed on the National Register of Historic Places in 2017.

It was built in 1960 to replace the previous service station, blown down in a windstorm in 1959.

According to a 2007 news article, "Randall, now 76, is a burly former Davis High football player turned rodeo cow cutter who likes to do the cha-cha. He could easily drive the two minutes to his shop but chooses to take the 90-minute scenic route by horse. That's three hours a day, just to get to work and back."

== See also ==
- List of historic filling stations
