= Smoot Dairy Farmhouse =

- U.S. National Register of Historic Places
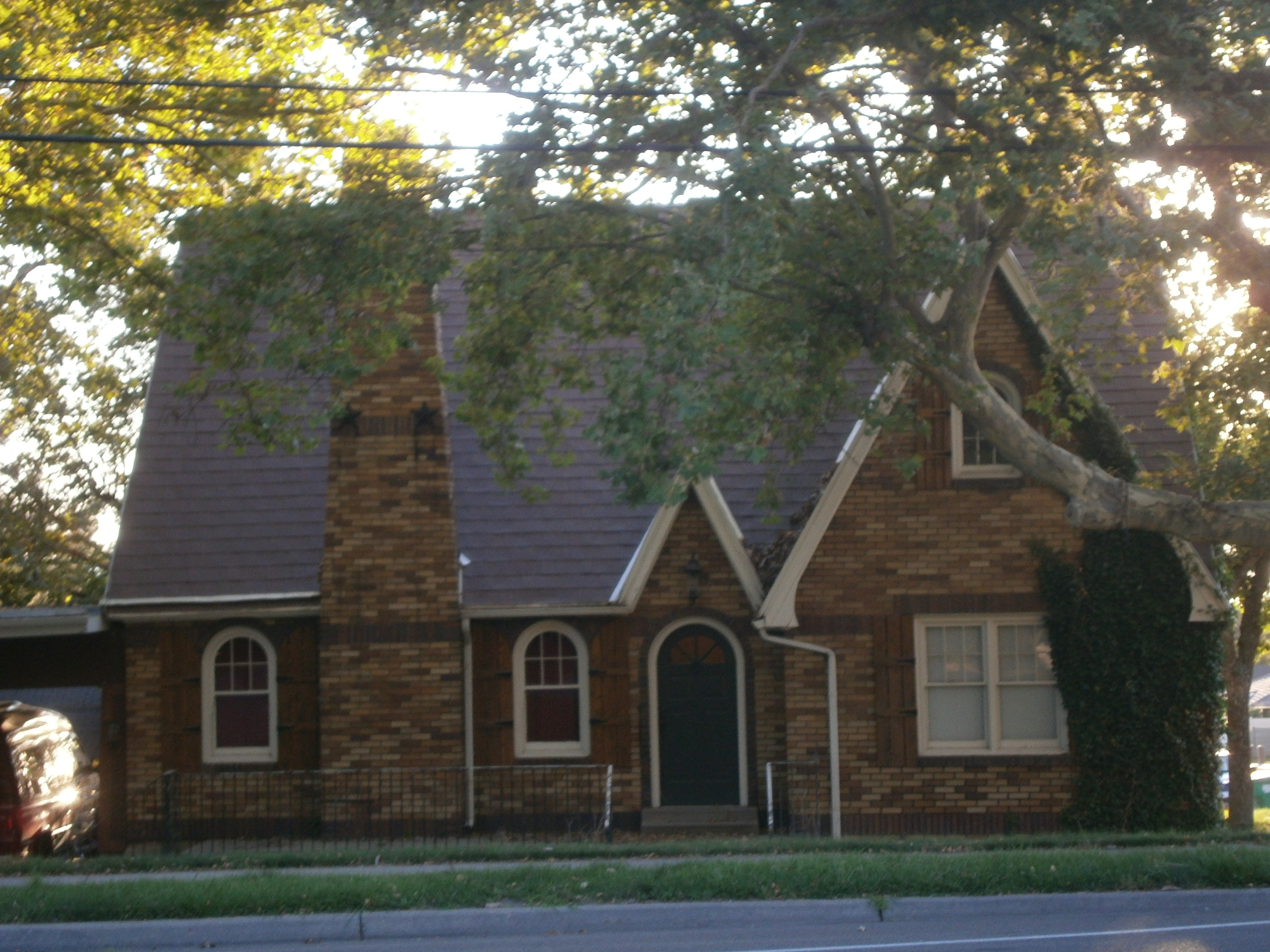

- Location within Utah Location within the United States
- Location: 1697 N. Main St., Centerville, Utah
- Coordinates: 40°56′31″N 111°52′49″W
- Area: .28 acres (0.11 ha)
- Built: 1936
- Architectural style: Tudor Revival
- MPS: Historic Resources of Centerville, Davis County, Utah
- NRHP reference No.: 16000123
- Added to NRHP: March 22, 2016

The Smoot Dairy Farmhouse, at 1697 N. Main St. in Centerville, Utah, was built in 1936. It was listed on the National Register of Historic Places in 2016.

It is a one-and-a-half-story Tudor Revival brick house, built upon a raised concrete foundation. Tudor Revival features include "distinctive round-head windows in the English Tudor style" and its "steeply-pitched front gables".

According to its National Register nomination, "the history of the property begins in 1935, when the Smoot family obtained the land and transferred a herd of dairy cows to Centerville. Until a devastating fire in 1963, the Smoot Dairy was one of the largest privately owned dairy farms in Utah. The farmhouse, which also served as an office, was one of only two buildings to survive the fire. Within a year of the fire, with aid from their Centerville neighbors, the Smoot family built the most modern dairy operation in the state. The period of significance ends in 1964 with the phoenix-like rise of the Smoot Dairy. During the historic period, the Smoot Dairy sold milk on site and made deliveries to an estimated 2,000 households in Centerville and the surrounding communities. The Smoot Dairy provided dairy products to numerous restaurants and hotels in the larger cities of the Wasatch Front, and was the regional dairy provider for United Airlines for thirty-two years. In addition, Edgar Smoot raised prizewinning pure-bred Jersey stock on loan to breeders throughout the western United States. The farmhouse is the only extant historic resource representing the Smoot family’s important contributions to the Centerville community."

It is located at the corner of Main Street and Jennings Lane (1700 North), which is the northeast corner of the original dairy farm's property.

A garage is a non-contributing building on the property.
