= Tull–Worth–Holland Farm =

Historic farm in North Carolina, United States

- U.S. National Register of Historic Places
- U.S. Historic district
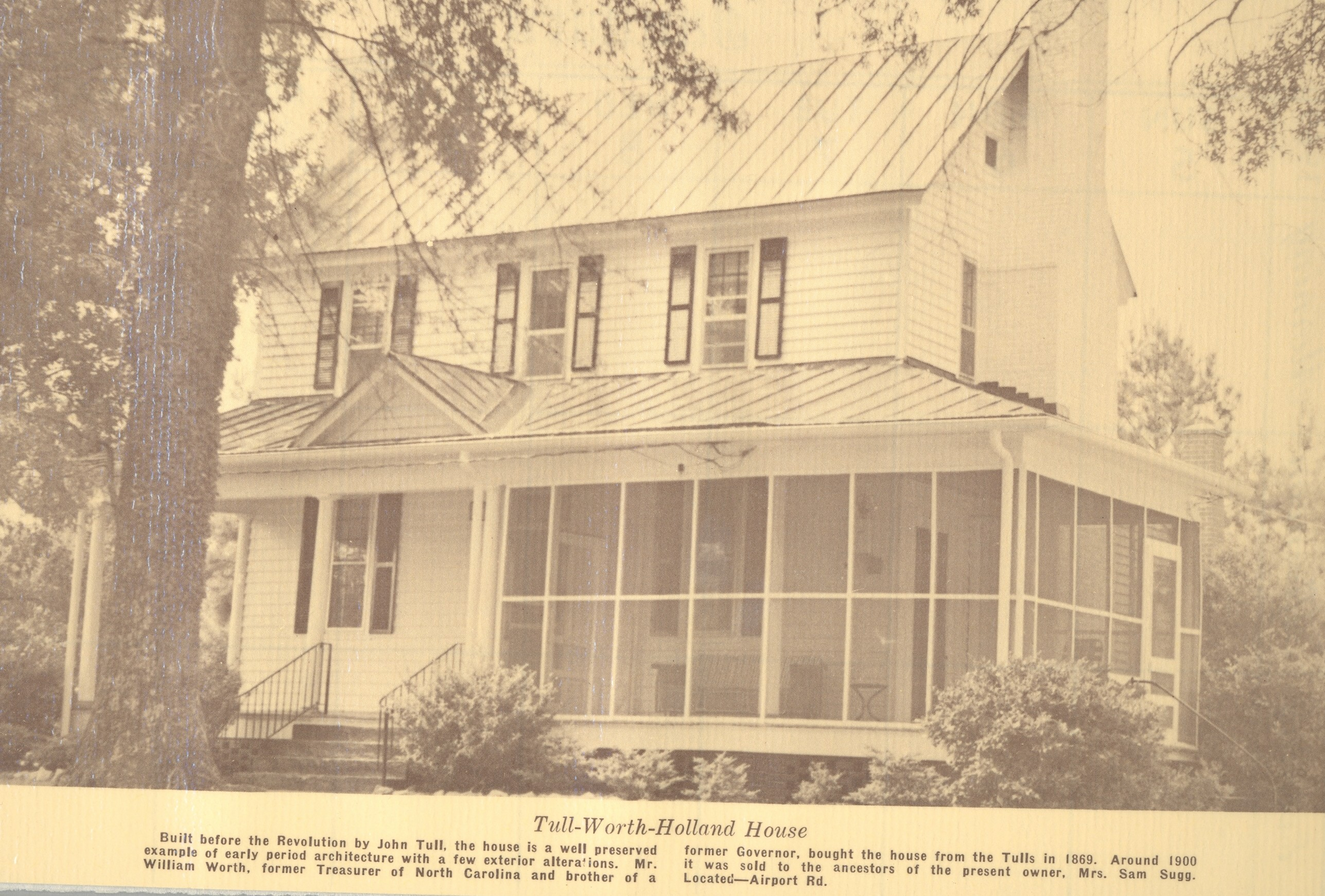

- Location within North Carolina Location within the United States
- Location: NC 1579 north side, 0.5 miles (0.80 km) east of junction with NC 1578, near Kinston, North Carolina
- Coordinates: 35°18′54″N 77°35′30″W
- Area: 184 acres (74 ha)
- Built: 1825
- Architectural style: Federal
- NRHP reference No.: 92001260
- Added to NRHP: September 22, 1992

Tull–Worth–Holland Farm is a historic farm and national historic district located near Kinston, Lenoir County, North Carolina. It encompasses 14 contributing buildings and 1 contributing site. The district includes a significant cross section of domestic and agricultural buildings constructed between 1825 and 1942. The farmhouse was built about 1825, and is a two-story, Federal style frame dwelling. It has a gable roof, exterior end chimneys, and hall-and-parlor plan. Other contributing resources are the Cook's House (c. 1890), privy / chicken house (c. 1850, c. 1930), Delco house (c. 1900), playhouse (c. 1925), barn (c. 1880), stable (c. 1870), cotton gin (c. 1880), five tobacco barns (c. 1900–1925), and a tenant house (c. 1875, c. 1900).

It was listed on the National Register of Historic Places in 1992.
