= Thomas Holland House =

- U.S. National Register of Historic Places
- Alabama Register of Landmarks and Heritage
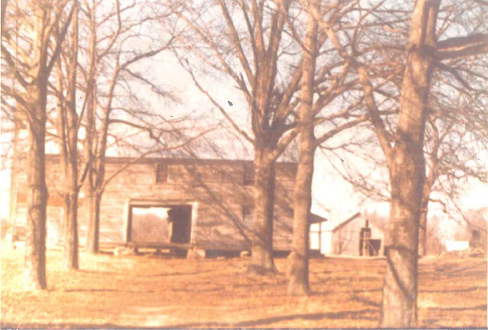
- House in a 1960 photo

- Location within Alabama Location within the United States
- Nearest city: Hillsboro, Alabama
- Coordinates: 34°35′45″N 87°12′20″W
- Area: 53 acres (21 ha)
- Built: 1836
- Architectural style: Dogtrot
- NRHP reference No.: 91001478

Significant dates
- Added to NRHP: October 1, 1991
- Designated ARLH: March 22, 1991

The Thomas Holland House was a historic residence near Hillsboro, Alabama. The house was built around 1836 by Thomas Holland, a South Carolinian who had come to Lawrence County, Alabama, in 1823. Holland began his plantation with 40 acres (16 ha) and built it to over 2100 acres (850 ha) by 1849. The house was a full two-story dogtrot house constructed of logs, one of the only of its type in Alabama. The exterior had since been covered in clapboard, and the breezeway had been finished with vertical boards and a chair rail. Enclosed stairways in each lower room gave access to the upper floor; the central room over the dogtrot was only accessible from the eastern room. The house was listed on the Alabama Register of Landmarks and Heritage and the National Register of Historic Places in 1991.

The house was destroyed by fire in 1997.
