= Farmington Tithing Office =

- U.S. National Register of Historic Places
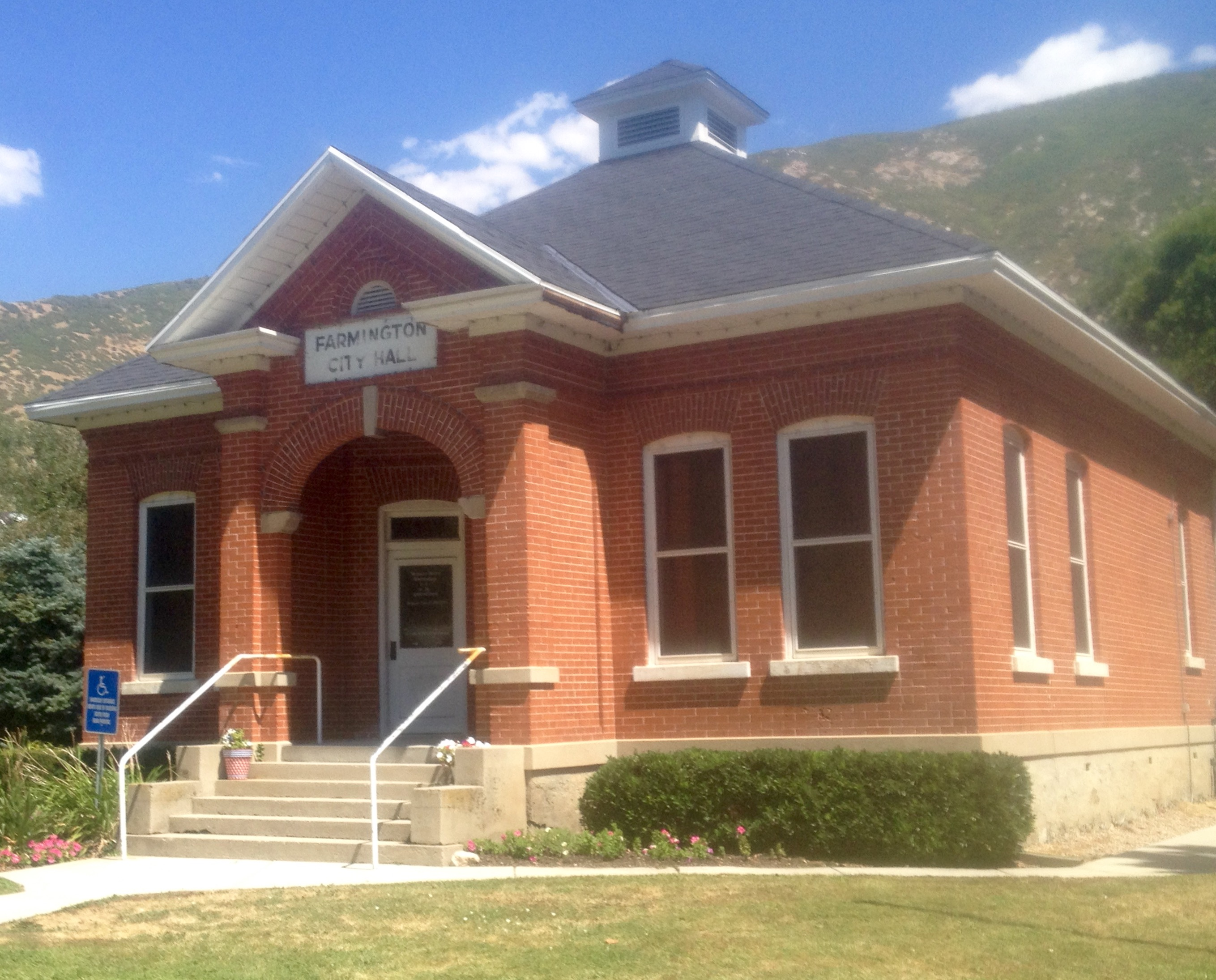

- Location within Utah Location within the United States
- Location: 110 N. Main St., Farmington, Utah
- Coordinates: 40°58′56.6″N 111°53′13.7″W
- Area: 0.8 acres (0.32 ha)
- Built: 1907-09
- Built by: Cottrell, Edward
- Architectural style: Late Victorian, Victorian Eclectic
- MPS: Tithing Offices and Granaries of the Mormon Church TR
- NRHP reference No.: 85000686
- Added to NRHP: March 28, 1985

The Farmington Tithing Office, at 110 N. Main St. in Farmington, Utah, was built during 1907–1909. It was listed on the National Register of Historic Places in 1985.

It is significant, according to a 1984 Utah State Historical Society review, "as one of 32 well preserved tithing buildings in Utah that were part of the successful "in-kind" tithing system of The Church of Jesus Christ of Latter-day Saints (LDS church) between the 1850s and about 1910."

Formerly used as Farmington's town hall, the building now houses the Farmington Historical Museum.
