= Holland–Towne House =

Historic house in Massachusetts, United States

- U.S. National Register of Historic Places
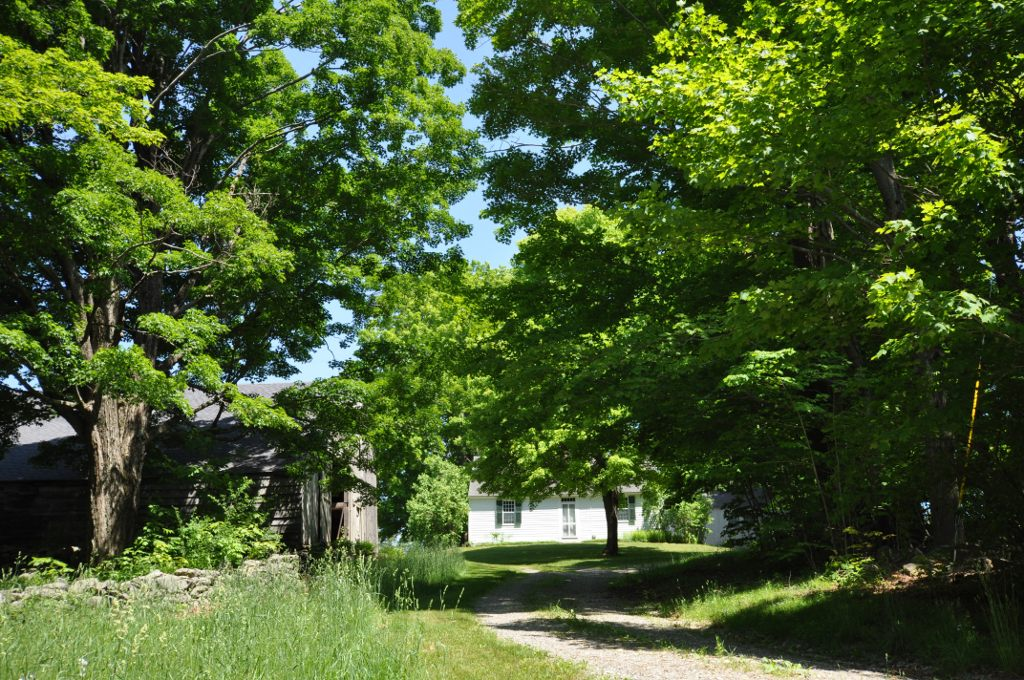

- Location within Massachusetts Location within the United States
- Location: Petersham, Massachusetts
- Coordinates: 42°30′1″N 72°11′6″W
- Built: 1752
- Architect: Jonas Holland
- Architectural style: Colonial
- NRHP reference No.: 89002327
- Added to NRHP: August 13, 1990

The Holland–Towne House is a historic house in Petersham, Massachusetts. Built in c. 1752 by Jonas Holland, it is one of the town's four surviving colonial-era houses. It was listed on the National Register of Historic Places in 1990.

== Description and history ==
The Holland–Towne House is located on a private road north of the Petersham village center. The privately owned house is a 1 1/2-story wood-frame structure, three bays wide, with a side-gable roof, central chimney, clapboard siding, and fieldstone foundation. The main facade faces south, and is nearly symmetrical, with windows in the outer bays, and the entrance slightly off-center, with simple trim and a four-light transom window above. The interior retains a great deal of original 18th-century materials, with the latest alterations dating to the early 19th century. A barn, probably dating to the turn of the 19th century, stands to the house's west.

The house was built c. 1752 by Jonas Holland and is one of only four colonial-era houses in the town. It is made more remarkable because its setting is also relatively unaltered since the early 19th century, with stone walls, agricultural and forest lands, and unpaved lanes. Jonas' sons, Park and Luther Holland, were American Revolutionary War veterans and active participants in the 1786 rural uprising known as Shays' Rebellion, and it is believed that some of the rebels were sheltered here. In 1816 the property was sold out of the Holland family; it was purchased by Dwight Towne in 1877.

The house property is the subject of a preservation easement held by Historic New England (formerly known as the Society for the Preservation of New England Antiquities).

== See also ==
- National Register of Historic Places listings in Worcester County, Massachusetts
