= Holland House (Buffalo, Wyoming) =

Historic house in Wyoming, United States

- U.S. National Register of Historic Places
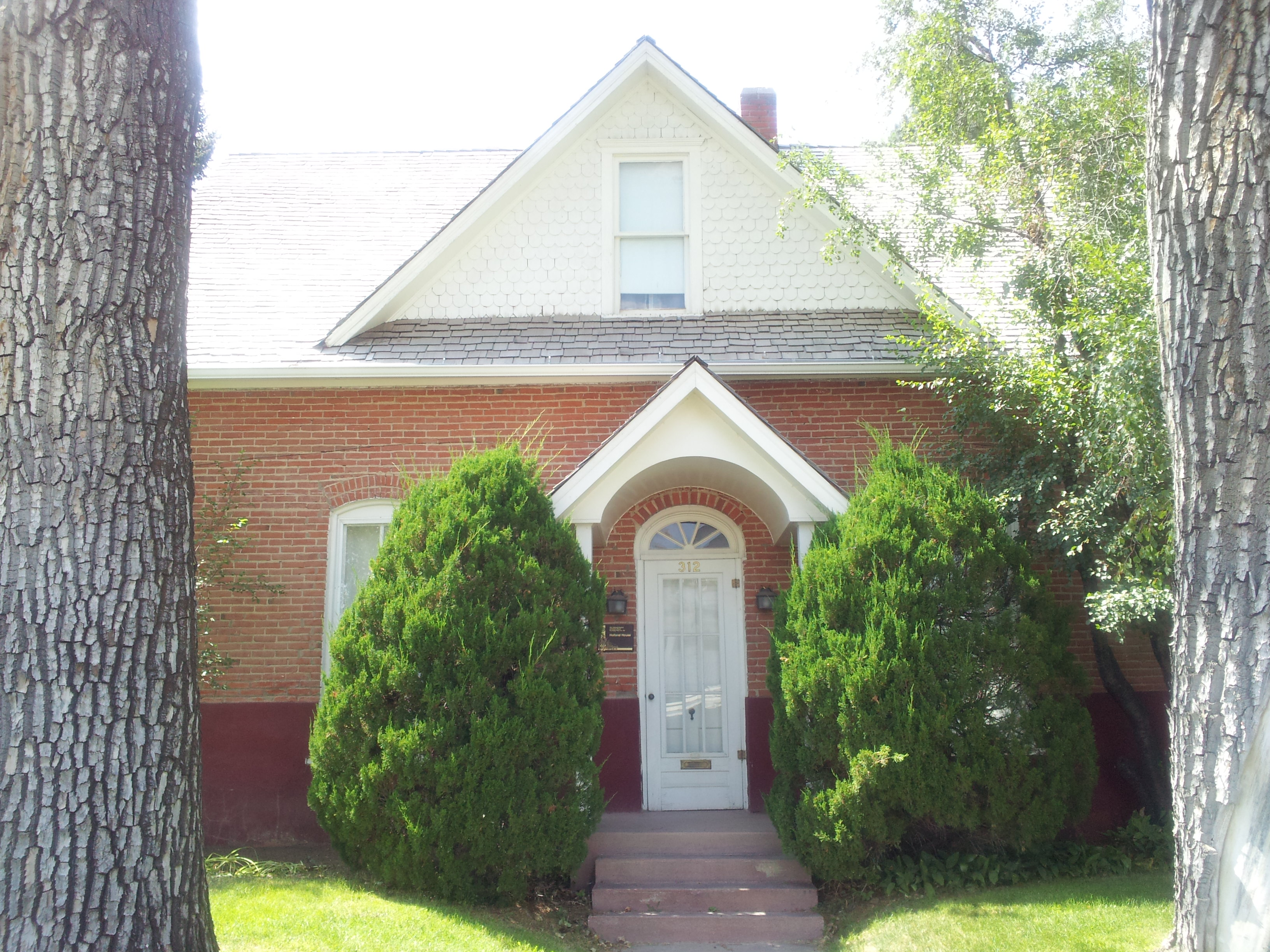
- Holland House

- Location within Wyoming Location within the United States
- Location: 312 N. Main St., Buffalo, Wyoming
- Coordinates: 44°21′5″N 106°41′56″W
- Area: 1.5 acres (0.61 ha)
- Built: 1883
- Built by: Edward Curran
- NRHP reference No.: 93001185
- Added to NRHP: November 4, 1993

The Holland House located on North Main Street in Buffalo, Wyoming is a historic residence, built in 1883. The home was one of the first brick homes built in Buffalo, and it was added to the National Register of Historic Places in 1993.

== Holland Family ==
William Henry Harrison Holland, born on October 28, 1840, served in the American Civil War from 1862 until 1865. Wounded three times, he spent nine months as a prisoner of war at Andersonville Confederate prison in Georgia. Following his discharge from the Union Army, he returned to his home in Sangamon, Illinois and married Ruth Ann Canterbury on February 12, 1867. In 1879, Holland came to Wyoming, and worked as a cowboy. In 1880, he moved to Johnson County, and he was the first settler in Johnson County to file final proof on his homestead. In the spring of 1881, he brought his family from Cheyenne in a wagon train with two wagons and an Army ambulance, a trip that took three weeks.

On October 2, 1882, "Harrison" (as he was known) Holland was appointed as a Johnson County Commissioner, and he won a full term from 1883 to 1885. He was one of the commissioners at the time the Johnson County Courthouse was built, and his name is on the cornerstone. Holland built the home at 312 North Main Street in Buffalo, and moved into it on Christmas Day, 1883. The home has remained in the family for five generations, and it is the only pioneer home in Buffalo still owned by the original family. "Harrison" Holland died in 1906, and his wife died in 1917."

"Harrison's" son, Albert Carlisle Holland married Isolina Christina Holland on May 14, 1891. Albert and Isolina lived in the Holland House from 1920 until Isolina died in 1930. Albert and Isolina had three daughters and a son. "Harrison's" grandson, William C. Holland married Marian Josephine Richter on November 29, 1929. William C. was the mayor of Buffalo from 1946 to 1950. Willam C. also served in the Wyoming State Legislature from 1943 to 1945, and from 1971 to 1978. He was also the chairman of the committee that produced the centennial history of Buffalo." William died in 1993, and his wife died on July 28, 2003. Their son ("Harrison's" great-grandson) Charles William Holland was born on March 29, 1939, and died on May 16, 2003. One of the two daughters of William C. Holland, Elaine Hough, was the co-author of the National Register nomination. Kathleen Holland Matuska served as President of both the Governing Board and the Endowment and Fund Raising Board of the Jim Gatchell Museum in Buffalo, Wyoming. Holland Matuska received the 2001 Achievers Award for her efforts in spearheading fundraising efforts for the Museum Association. One of Holland Matuska's fundraisers involved the branding of Jim Gatchell Carriage House which can be seen today. Kathleen Holland Matuska was also actively involved in the community as a member of the Johnson County Fair Board and local 4-H.

== Holland House ==
The Holland House was built on land deeded to William Henry Harrison by Mrs. Juliet W. Hart. In the deed, Mrs. Hart stipulated that the house must cost at least $2500.00. The builder was Edward Curren, who also built the Johnson County Courthouse.

The Holland House is a good example of a late Victorian vernacular brick house. It has decorative window arches and shingles in the gable ends, as well as a bay window on the south side. The building is L-shaped, with a rectangular addition on the rear, and it is one-and-a-half stories tall. The roof is gabled with a main side gable intersected with smaller front and rear gables.

The brick for the house was manufactured by the Buffalo Brick Company, and is laid in a common bond. Red colored stucco placed over the foundations covers about a quarter of the wall on the facade, and the rest of the brick walls. Two double hung windows flank the front entry. Two headers of brock are placed above the windows to form rowlock arches.

The entrance to the house is through a 1930s style colonial revival door with a fanlight above the glass panel storm door. A gabled hood covers the front stoop. This hood replaces an earlier frame porch that was removed for structural purposes. A bay window centered on the middle of the original house's south side has three double hung windows. A frame screened-in porch was added during the 1890s, and it is located south of the bay window on the south side of the house. Glass windows were added to the porch in 1956 to make it into a sun porch. A shed roof covers the back porch. Access to the rear of the house is provided through the sun porch addition.

The original interior plan featured a central hall with a living room on one side and a parlor on the other. Stairs to the upper story were in the central hall. The kitchen and pantry were in the rear. Three bedrooms were located on the upper story. Remodeling in 1937 and 1956 changed the interior slightly. The upper story now had a bedroom. The house is shaded by 100-year-old cottonwood trees that were planted by the original owner.
