= John, Harriet, and Eliza Jennett Duncan House =

- John Duncan Harriet
- U.S. National Register of Historic Places
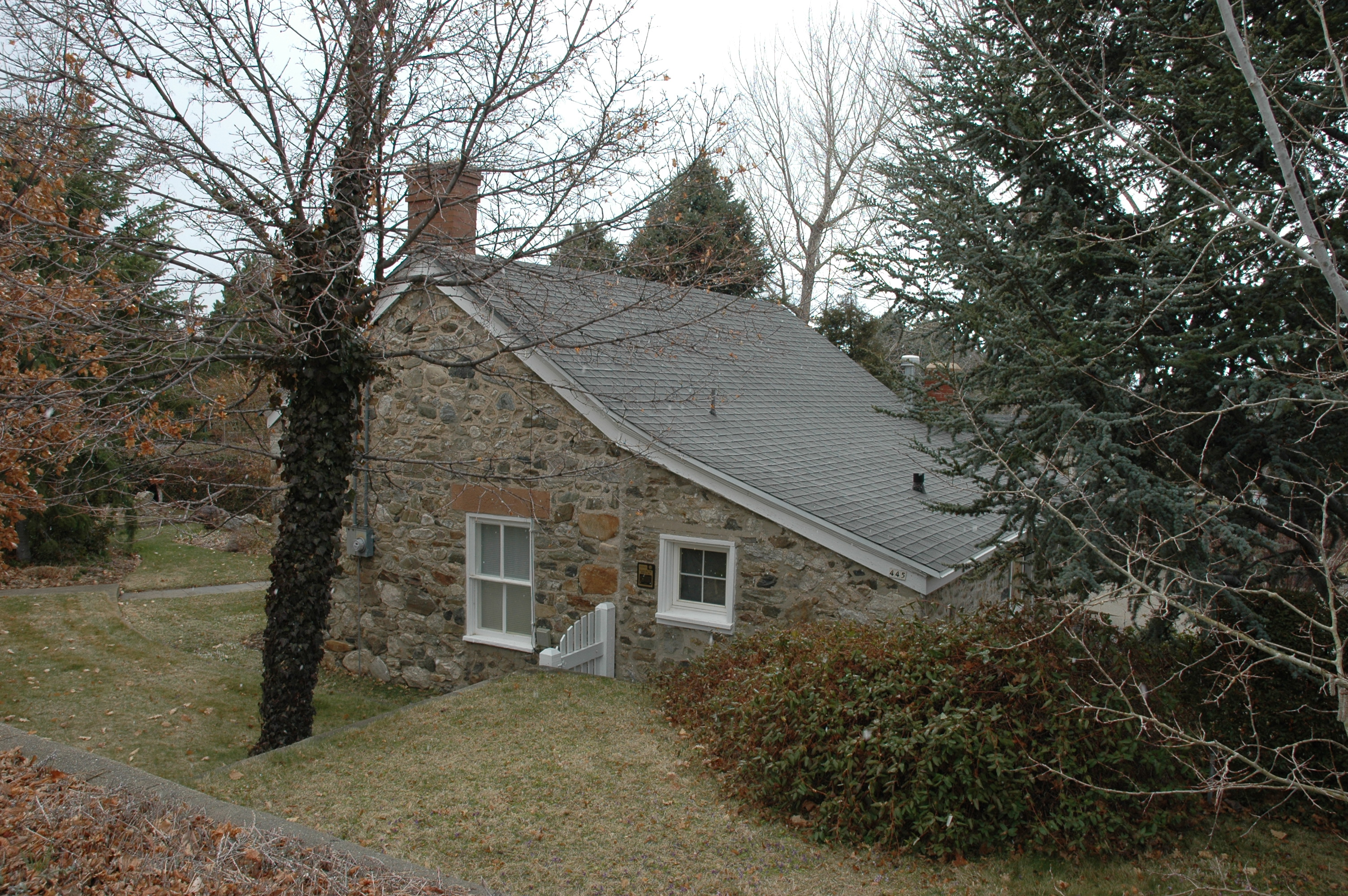

- Location within Utah Location within the United States
- Location: 445 North 400 East, Centerville, Utah
- Coordinates: 40°55′19″N 111°52′21″W
- Area: less than one acre
- Built: c.1873
- Built by: Charles Duncan and John Duncan
- MPS: Centerville MPS
- NRHP reference No.: 97001312
- Added to NRHP: November 17, 1997

The John, Harriet, and Eliza Jennett Duncan House, at 445 N. 400 East in Centerville, Utah was built around 1873. It was listed on the National Register of Historic Places in 1997.

It is a stone house probably built around 1873, probably by Charles Duncan (stonemason) (1823-1891) and son John Samuel Duncan. Charles was a Scottish-born stonemason who helped build the Salt Lake Temple during the 1863-67 portion of its construction.

"In 1852 the entire family sailed across the ocean on the Kennebec; arriving in the Salt Lake valley in September 1853.6 When the Duncans first arrived in Utah they lived with friends in Centerville for a brief time. Charles soon purchased land in Kaysville, and he moved the family there in the spring of 1854. Charles built a log cabin where his twin sons, John Samuel and Charles Jr., were born on May 22. The crops failed, and the family returned to Centerville in July. Word of Charles skill as a stonemason spread quickly; he was hired to build homes throughout the Centerville and Farmington area. Charles' career in masonry spanned from 1853 to 1891. Charles taught the trade to his three sons, John, Charles and Archibald. Most of the early rock buildings and culverts in South Davis County were built by the Duncans. Additionally, Charles worked for many years cutting stone for the Salt Lake City L.D.S. Temple which was constructed during 1863-67. A common, 'trademark' feature of the rock homes built by the Duncans is frequent use of quoins made from granite or sandstone. Charles brought back to Centerville pieces of stone which had been discarded or deemed unsuitable for the L.D.S. Temple. He used these stones to add decoration, as well as religious symbolism, to the residences in Centerville. Charles and his wife Margaret lived in the seven room stone house at 558 N. 340 E. with his son Archibald.7 Charles died in April 1891.8 John Samuel worked with his father, Charles Duncan, in building the Classical style stone house c.1873. It reportedly was originally one large room with the adobe interior partitions added later. John bought the house from his father in 1888. According to the 1880 census records, John, age 26, lived with Harriet (Hattie) M., age 22, his wife, and Hattie M., age 2, and George W(alter) age 4/12, his two children, presumably in this house. In 1900 he was living with Eliza Jennett (Jennie), his second wife, and two children, Walter and Erma. Eliza Jennett was born in 1864 and died in August 1918. It appears that Harriet died prior to John's marriage to Eliza Jennett, however, it is unknown.9 In 1926 this house was sold to Harold Duncan, a son of John and Eliza Jennett born in 190410 . Little is known about Harold. The house was then sold to John and Harriet's son, George Walter, in ...."

Does it have Saltbox architecture, see Category:Saltbox architecture in Utah

"The house is built of local stone which the pioneers of Centerville called 'mountain rock'.2 A brick chimney pierces the roof peak at the east end. There are asphalt shingles on the roof and there is a simple wood soffit and fascia. The facade of the house, or south elevation, is symmetrical with a door in the center and matching wood, two-over-two double hung windows on either side. The door and windows are constructed with sandstone lintels; there are sandstone and granite quoins on all four corners and on the corners of the north shed roof addition. The front porch is not covered, consisting only of a concrete slab at the threshold which is approximately eight inches high. There is a shed addition to the rear, or north, which was built very soon after the main block of the home. The shed roof extends out from the eaves of the main building, giving the house the appearance of a saltbox type residence. This addition contains a bathroom and a kitchen, and has a brick chimney at the west end."

Other structures on the site include a second contributing building, located directly to the north of the main house, which was reportedly the first house here. It is a one-room rock building. Also a carport/open garage was added in 1932. And a rock-built shed/storage addition to its west has stonework not matching the Duncans', and was apparently built by a different mason.
