= Rich-Steeper House =

- Rich--Steeper House
- U.S. National Register of Historic Places
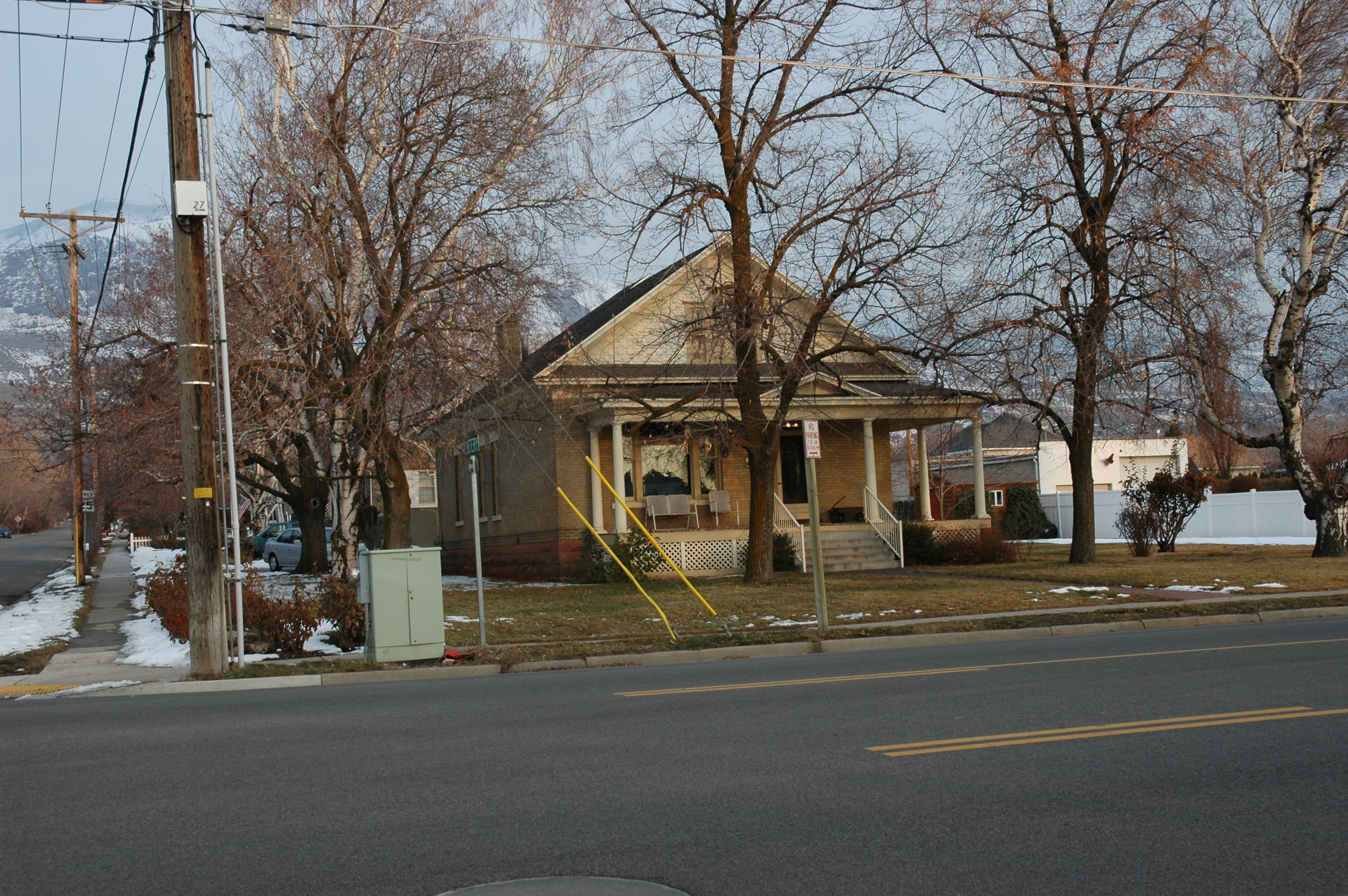

- Location within Utah Location within the United States
- Location: 415 S. Main St., Centerville, Utah
- Coordinates: 40°54′46″N 111°52′42″W
- Area: less than one acre
- Built: 1908
- Architectural style: Late Victorian
- MPS: Centerville MPS
- NRHP reference No.: 97001318
- Added to NRHP: November 17, 1997

The Rich-Steeper House, at 415 S. Main St. in Centerville, Utah, was built in 1908. It was listed on the National Register of Historic Places in 1997.

It is a one-and-a-half-story yellow brick single family residence. Its design is transitional, between Victorian and Bungalow form; it combines central-block-with-projecting bays and bungalow house types, and has Neoclassical stylings. Its front, south-facing gables have "Palladian style windows with decorative muntins in the upper sashes of the flanking windows."
