= Hector C. Haight House =

United States historic place in Farmington, Utah

- U.S. National Register of Historic Places
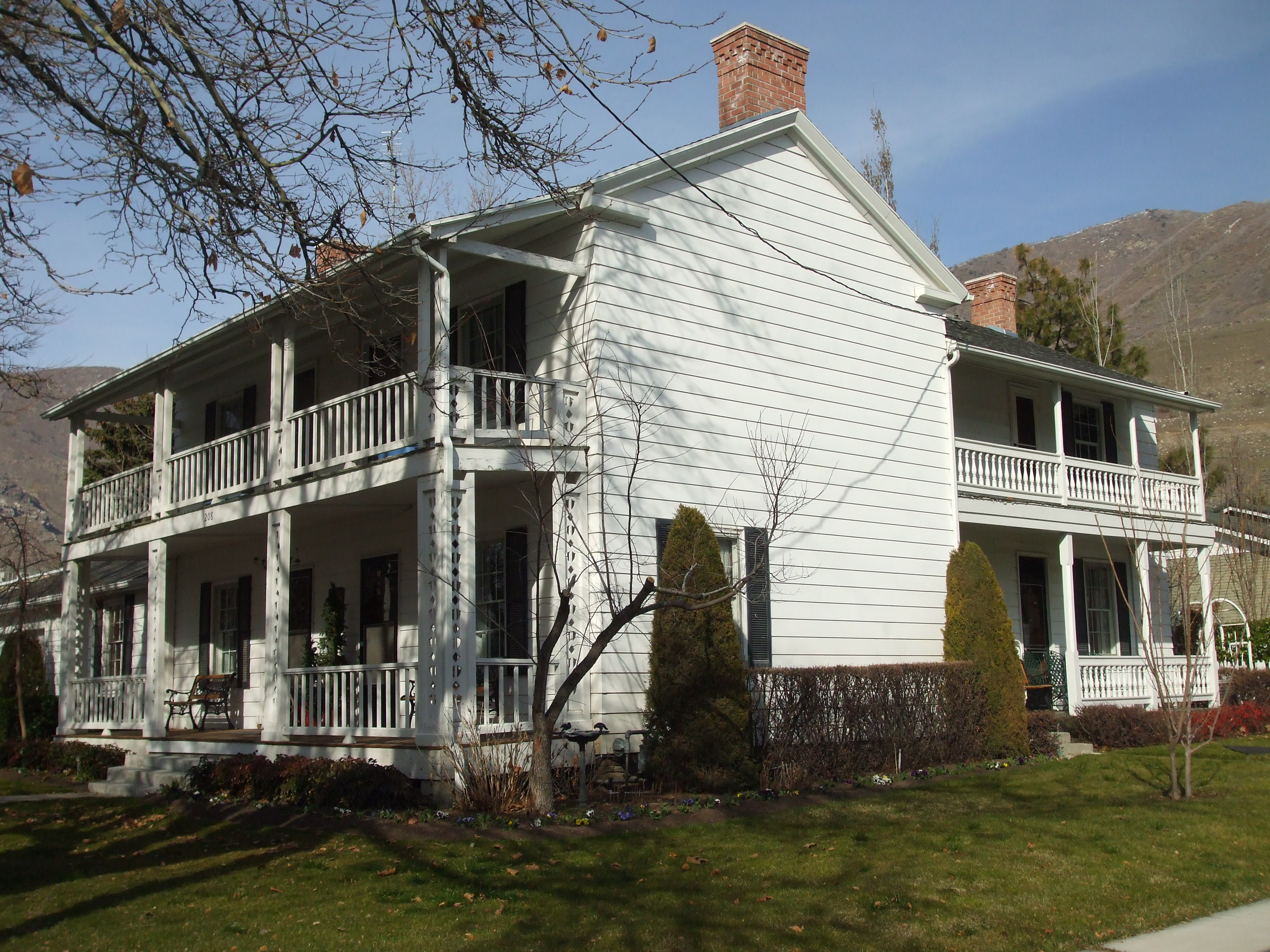

- Location within Utah Location within the United States
- Location: 208 N. Main St., Farmington, Utah
- Coordinates: 40°59′03″N 111°53′11″W
- Area: less than one acre
- Built: 1857
- Built by: Haight, Hector C.
- NRHP reference No.: 85001141
- Added to NRHP: May 17, 1985

The Hector C. Haight House, at 208 N. Main St. in Farmington, Utah, was built in 1857. It was listed on the National Register of Historic Places in 1985. It has also been known as the Union Hotel.

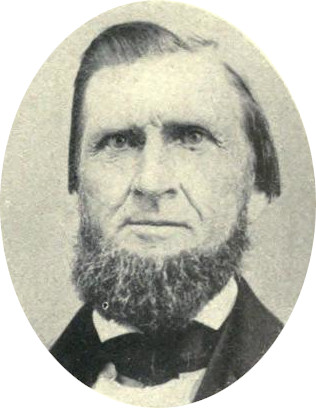
Hector C. Haight

It was built around 1857 as a two-story adobe "double cell" house, facing west, with adobe walls that are 18 inches (0.46 m) thick. It was the home of Hector C. Haight and his family and was probably built by him. Around 1870, a two-story rear wing was added, with a two-story porch facing south. Around that time, Haight began operating part of the building as the Union Hotel. The front porch of the original portion and the south-facing porch were removed at some date(s), but were rebuilt in 1984.

In 1984, it was deemed "architecturally significant as one of a very limited number of two story double cell houses in Utah. Because the state survey is not complete, it is impossible to conclusively state how many houses of this type are extant, but the double cell in its one story form was not a popular traditional house type in the early days of settlement. Two story examples of the type are even less common. The house is also historically significant as the oldest remaining hotel in Farmington, as one of the few remaining houses in Utah that were built during the 1850s, and for its association with Hector C. Haight, the 'father of Farmington.'"
