= Window cornice =

A window cornice is an ornamental framework of wood or composition to which window curtains are attached by rods with rings or hooks. Cornices are often gilded and of elaborate design, but they are less fashionable today than before the discovery that elaborate draperies harbor dust and microbes.

Like other pieces of furniture, they preserve the historical tastes of their creators, and many of the carefully constructed examples of the latter part of the 18th century are still in use in the rooms for which they were made. Chippendale provided a famous series still in situ for the gallery at Harewood House, the valances of which are, like the cornices themselves, of carved and painted wood.
