= Dr. Madison Monroe Holland House =

Historic house in Georgia, United States

- U.S. National Register of Historic Places
- U.S. Historic district
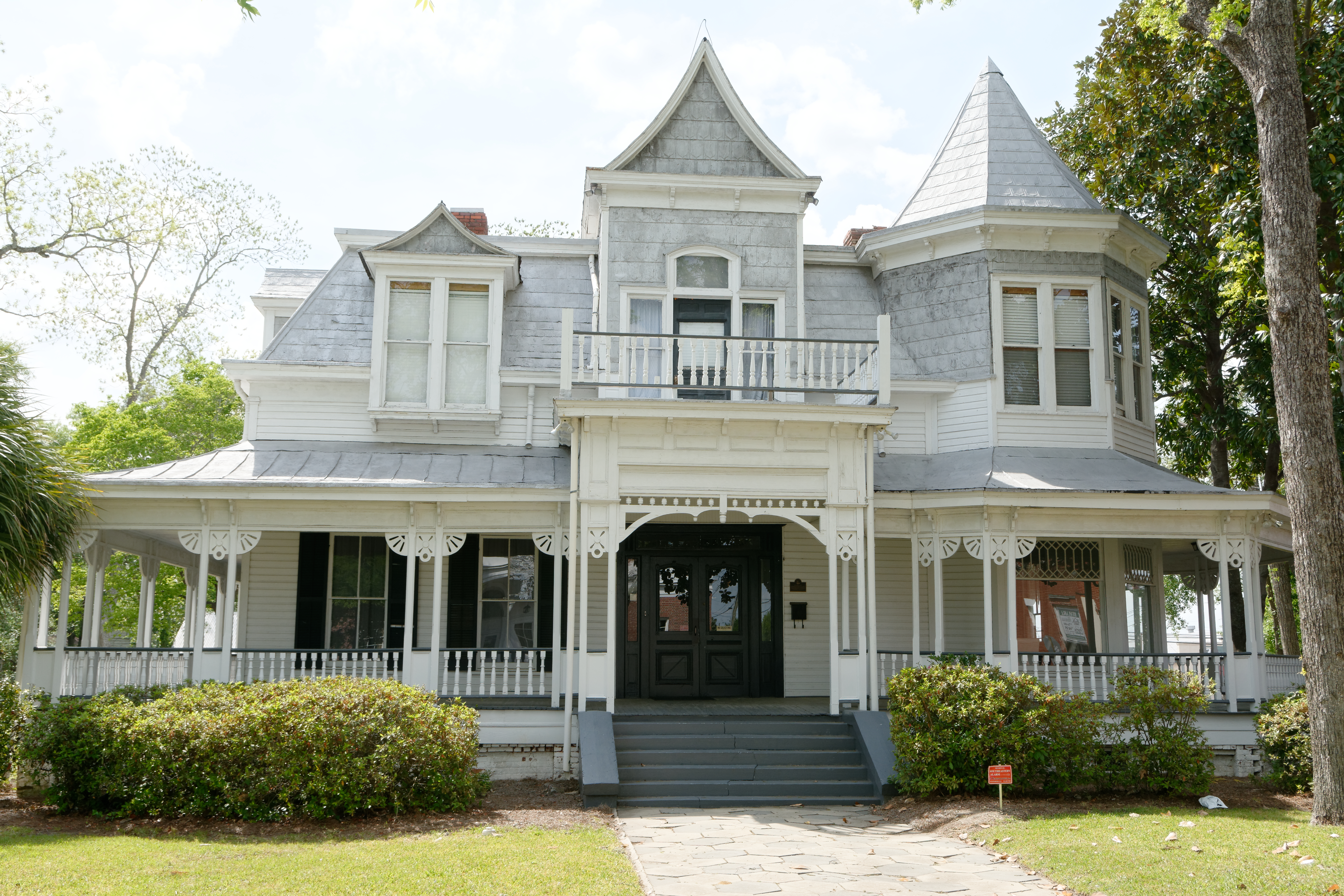
- Dr. Madison Monroe Holland House (2017)

- Location within Georgia Location within the United States
- Location: 27 S. Main St./US 301, Statesboro, Georgia
- Coordinates: 32.44782°N 81.78386°W
- Area: less than one acre
- Built: 1888, 1908
- Architectural style: Queen Anne
- MPS: Downtown Statesboro MPS
- NRHP reference No.: 89001157
- Added to NRHP: September 6, 1989

The Dr. Madison Monroe Holland House in Statesboro, Georgia is a Queen Anne-style house which was built in 1888 and expanded in 1908. It was listed on the National Register of Historic Places in 1989. The listing included three contributing buildings and one contributing structure.

Queen Anne features include asymmetric massing, a turret on the front facade, a wrap-around porch and a central second-floor balcony. It has dormers with paired double-hung windows, a pressed metal mansard roof, and weatherboard siding.

It was built in 1888 as a one-story four-bedroom residence. It was expanded to add a second floor with six rooms and a balcony in 1908, allowing Dr. Holland to use the second floor as his medical office and a small hospital, and to close his separate medical office downtown. The county had no hospital at the time. He used the second floor's northeast bedroom, which includes the Queen Anne turret, as his office.

A historic barn is gone, but the property still had, in 1989, a cane boiler, a smokehouse, and a later-built but still historic automobile garage.

Statesboro was the subject of a wider survey of historic resources completed at the same time as the NRHP nomination for the district.
