= Ward–Holland House =

- Ward-Holland House
- U.S. National Register of Historic Places
- Michigan State Historic Site
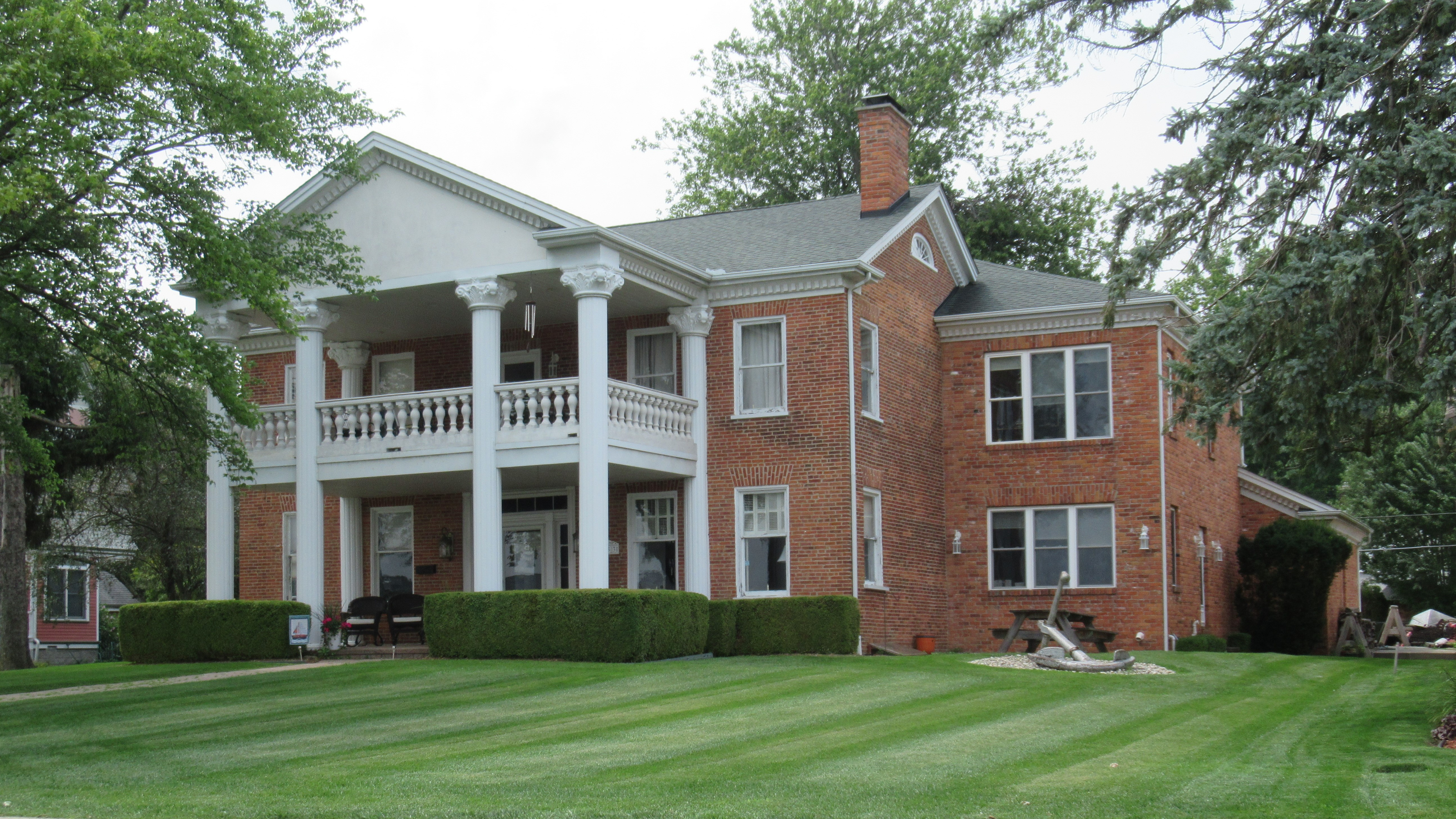

- Location within Michigan Location within the United States
- Interactive map
- Location: 433 N. Main St., Marine City, Michigan
- Coordinates: 42°43′26″N 82°29′22″W
- Area: 1 acre (0.40 ha)
- Built: 1830
- Built by: Capt. Samuel Ward
- Architectural style: Greek Revival
- NRHP reference No.: 72001305
- Added to NRHP: January 13, 1972

The Ward-Holland House is a private house located at 433 North Main Street in Marine City, Michigan. It was listed on the National Register of Historic Places in 1972.

== History ==
Captain Samuel Ward was known throughout Michigan as "Uncle Sam the Steamboat King." In 1819, Ward settled in Marine City and constructed a shipyard and a brickyard. He built this house about 1830, which at the time was described as being one of two brick houses between Detroit and the North Pole. Through the nineteenth century, the Ward family acquired extensive mercantile, shipping, and manufacturing interests, and dominated the shipping trade on the Great Lakes.

Ward lived in this house until he died. In 1876, the house was purchased from Ward's estate by Robert Holland, also a shipbuilder. The Holland family owned the house until 1994, when it was sold to Lisa and Steve Kern.

== Description ==
The Ward-Holland House is a two-story brick Greek Revival structure. The outer walls are solid brick, reportedly 16 inches thick, and the house is framed with hand hewn beams eight to twelve inches square. The house sits on a full basement made of massive stone. The house previously had a gingerbread style front porch; the current Greek Revival style portico was added at a later date.

On the interior, there are seven rooms and three fireplaces. All the rooms had "Christian doors" where the paneling forms a cross.
