= James and Jane Eldredge House =

- U.S. National Register of Historic Places
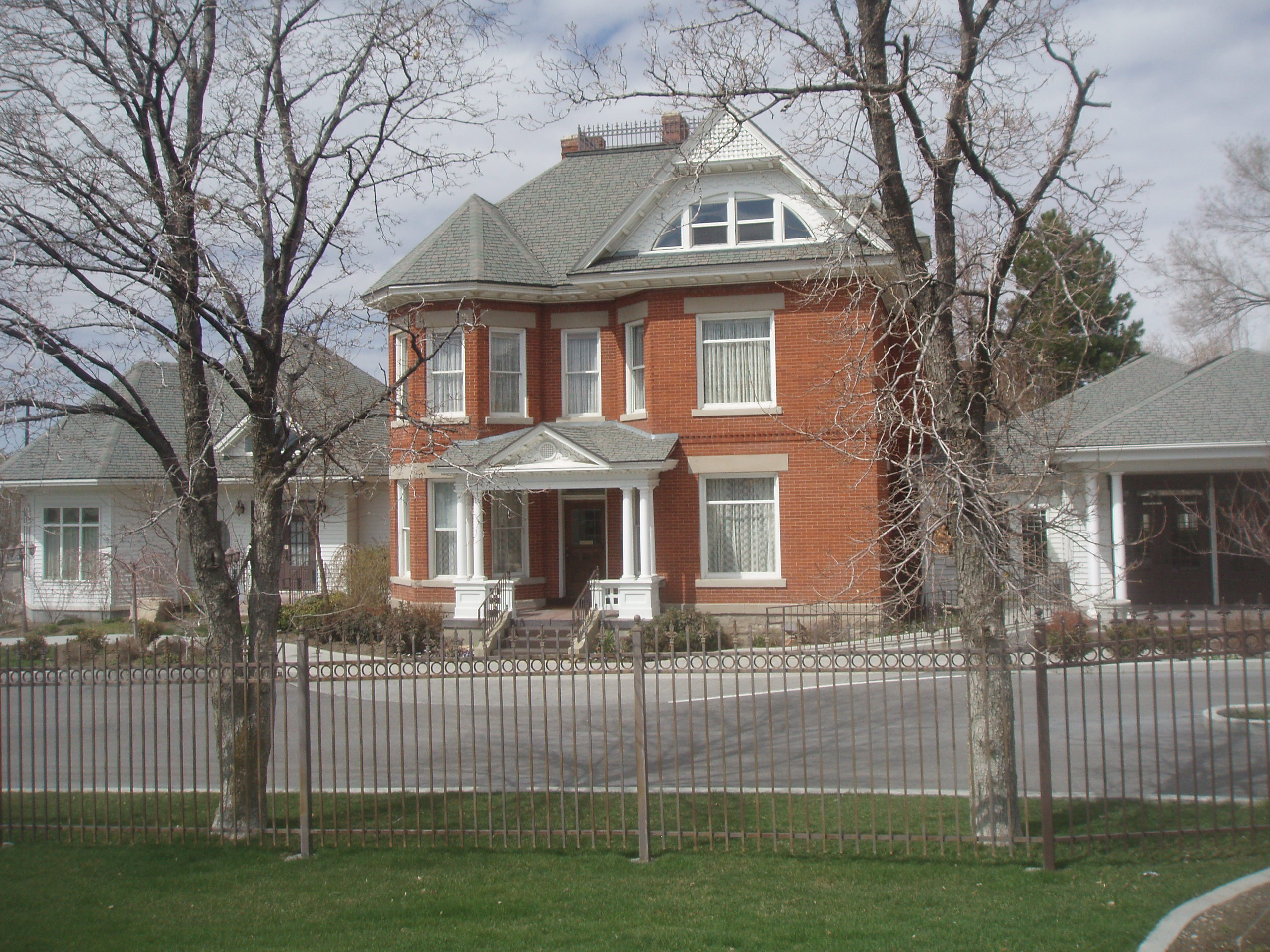

- Location within Utah Location within the United States
- Location: 564 W 400 N, West Bountiful, Utah
- Coordinates: 40°53′40″N 111°53′35″W
- Area: 1.4 acres (0.57 ha)
- Built: 1902
- Architectural style: Late Victorian, Victorian Eclectic
- NRHP reference No.: 05000595
- Added to NRHP: June 10, 2005

The James and Jane Eldredge House, at 564 West 400 North in West Bountiful, Utah, was built in 1896. It was listed on the National Register of Historic Places in 2005.

It is a two-and-a-half-story brick house with Victorian Eclectic and Italianate architecture. It is built upon a stone foundation consisting of sandstone blocks at the front and granite in the rear. It has a central block and projecting bays. There are additions to the rear and a recent (as of 2005) one-story front addition to the east of the main house.

A two-story carriage house to the rear, which was converted into a residence in 1977, is a second contributing building in the listing.

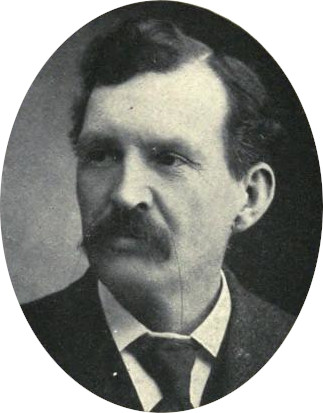
James A. Eldredge

The house's original owners were James A. Eldredge, a state legislator and businessman, and Jane Jennings Eldredge, daughter of William Walker Jennings. The house was a social center, and was even connected by a railroad spur from the Devereaux House, another social center, in Salt Lake City, during the early 1900s. It was deemed significant in part as "an excellent remaining example of a large Victorian Eclectic style house with an extant carriage house, within the City of West Bountiful. Carriage houses were rare in Utah, but were ubiquitous in West Bountiful, this being a prime example."
