= Bountiful Historic District =

Historic district in Utah, United States

- U.S. National Register of Historic Places
- U.S. Historic district
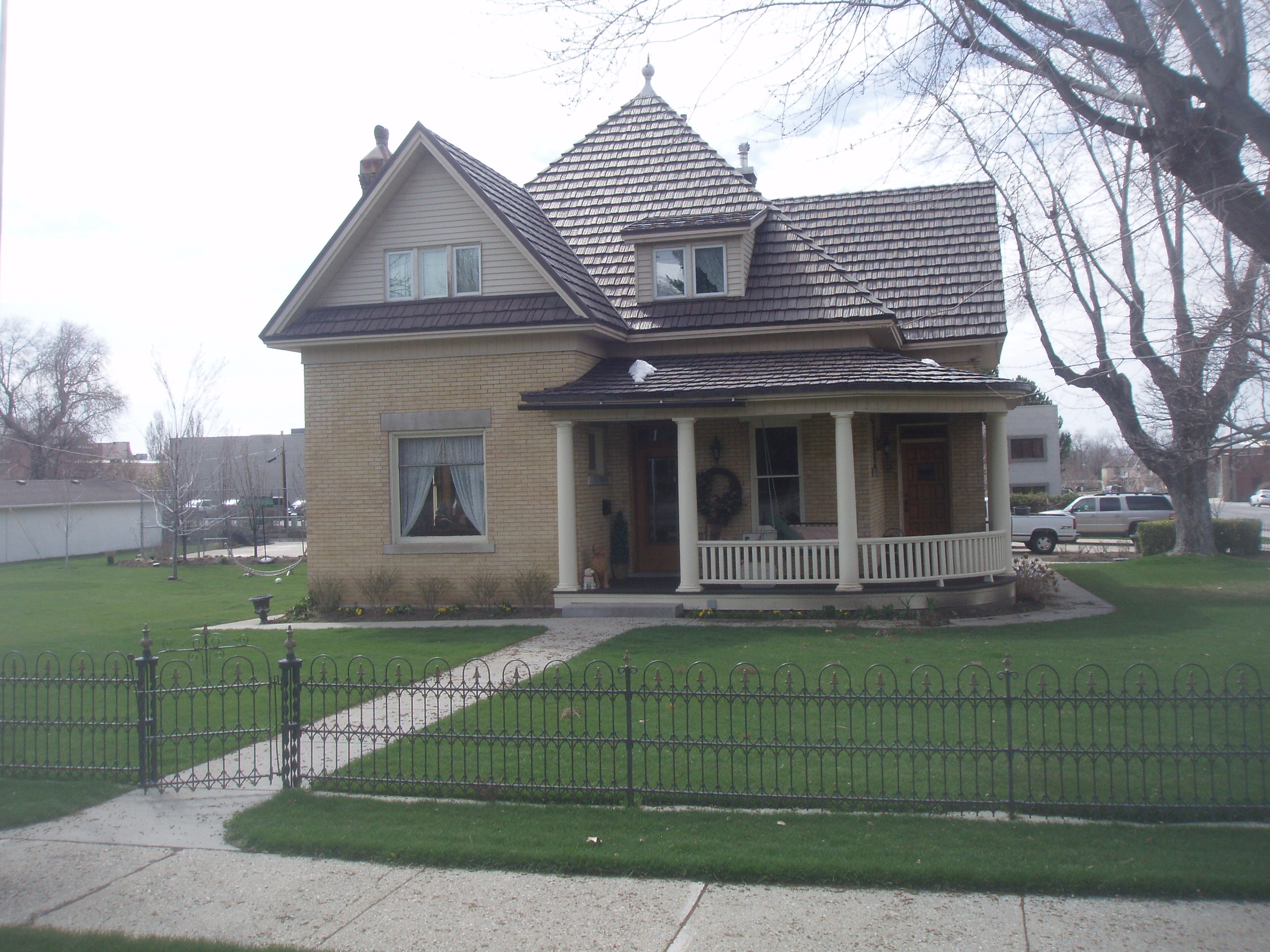

- Location within Utah Location within the United States
- Location: Roughly bounded by 200 W., 500 S., 400 E., & 400 N., Bountiful, Utah
- Coordinates: 40.8894°N 111.87847°W
- Area: 310 acres (130 ha)
- Built: 1850
- Architectural style: Mid 19th Century Revival, Late Victorian
- NRHP reference No.: 05001194
- Added to NRHP: October 26, 2005

The Bountiful Historic District in Bountiful, Utah has significance dating to 1850. It is a 310-acre (130 ha) historic district that was listed on the National Register of Historic Places in 2005. It includes Mid 19th Century Revival, Late Victorian, and other architecture, among its 522 contributing buildings and one contributing site.

== See also ==
- West Bountiful Historic District, also NRHP-listed and in the neighboring city of West Bountiful, Utah
