= VanFleet Hotel =

- U.S. National Register of Historic Places
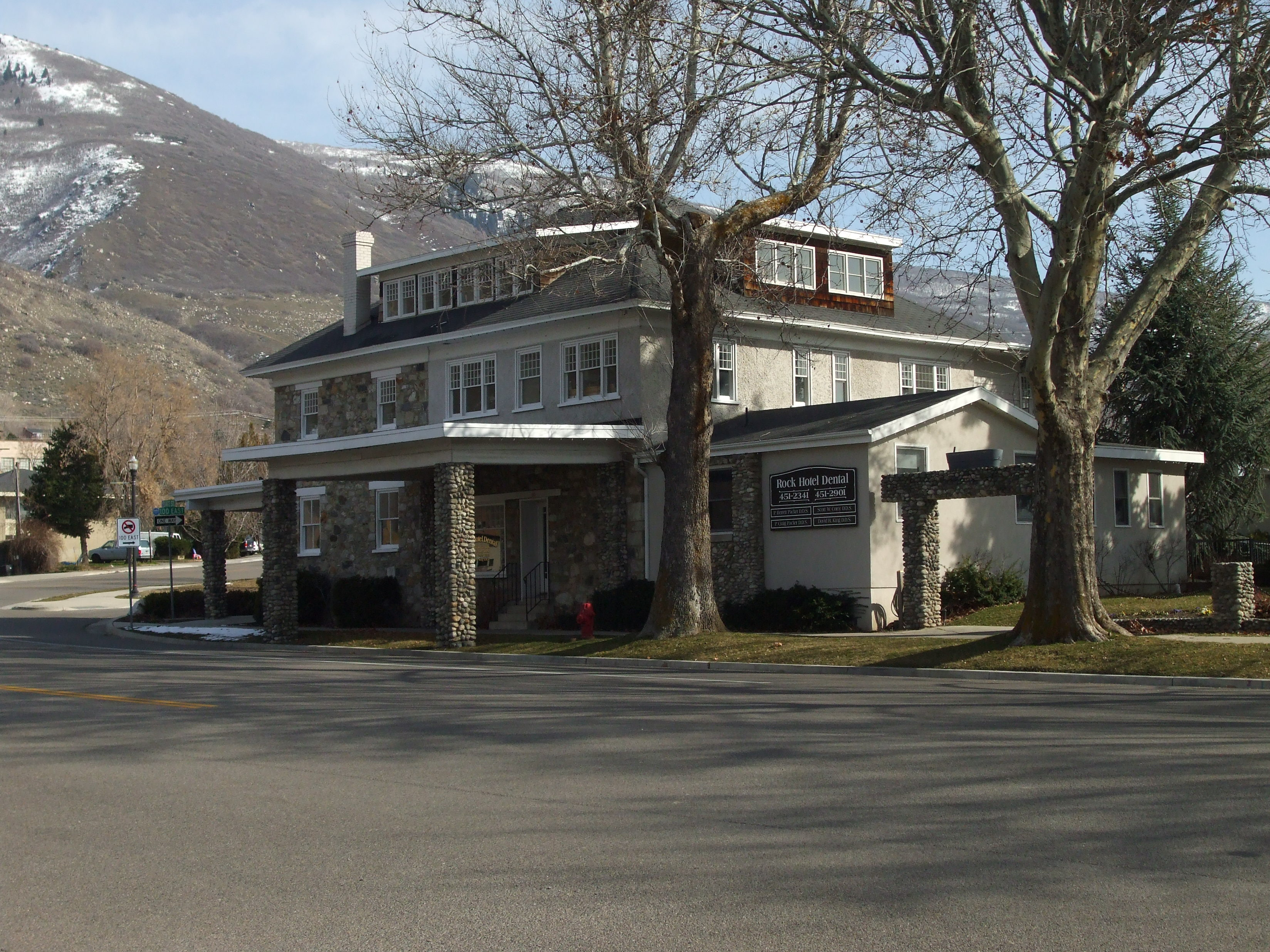
- The building now houses dental offices.

- Location within Utah Location within the United States
- Location: 88 E. State St., Farmington, Utah
- Coordinates: 40°58′48″N 111°53′5″W
- Built: 1860
- Architect: Bounre, Charles; VanFleet, Heber J.
- Architectural style: Mid 19th Century Revival, Bungalow/Craftsman
- NRHP reference No.: 91001819
- Added to NRHP: December 19, 1991

The VanFleet Hotel in Farmington, Utah was built during the 1860s for Thomas and Electra Hunt.

== History ==
Originally a residence, it became a hotel in the 1870s as a result of its proximity to a Wells Fargo stage coach stop. It was purchased by Hyrum Van Fleet in 1908, but it was devastated by a fire in 1913. The subsequent reconstruction doubled its size. As it was next to the courthouse, it became known as the "honeymoon hotel" as a result of the many newlyweds who stayed there. The Van Fleet family operated the hotel until 1953, when it was converted to apartments.

The building was listed on the National Register of Historic Places on December 19, 1991.

It currently houses dental offices after a 1995 renovation.
