= Alfred H. Richards House =

Historic house in Massachusetts, United States

- U.S. National Register of Historic Places
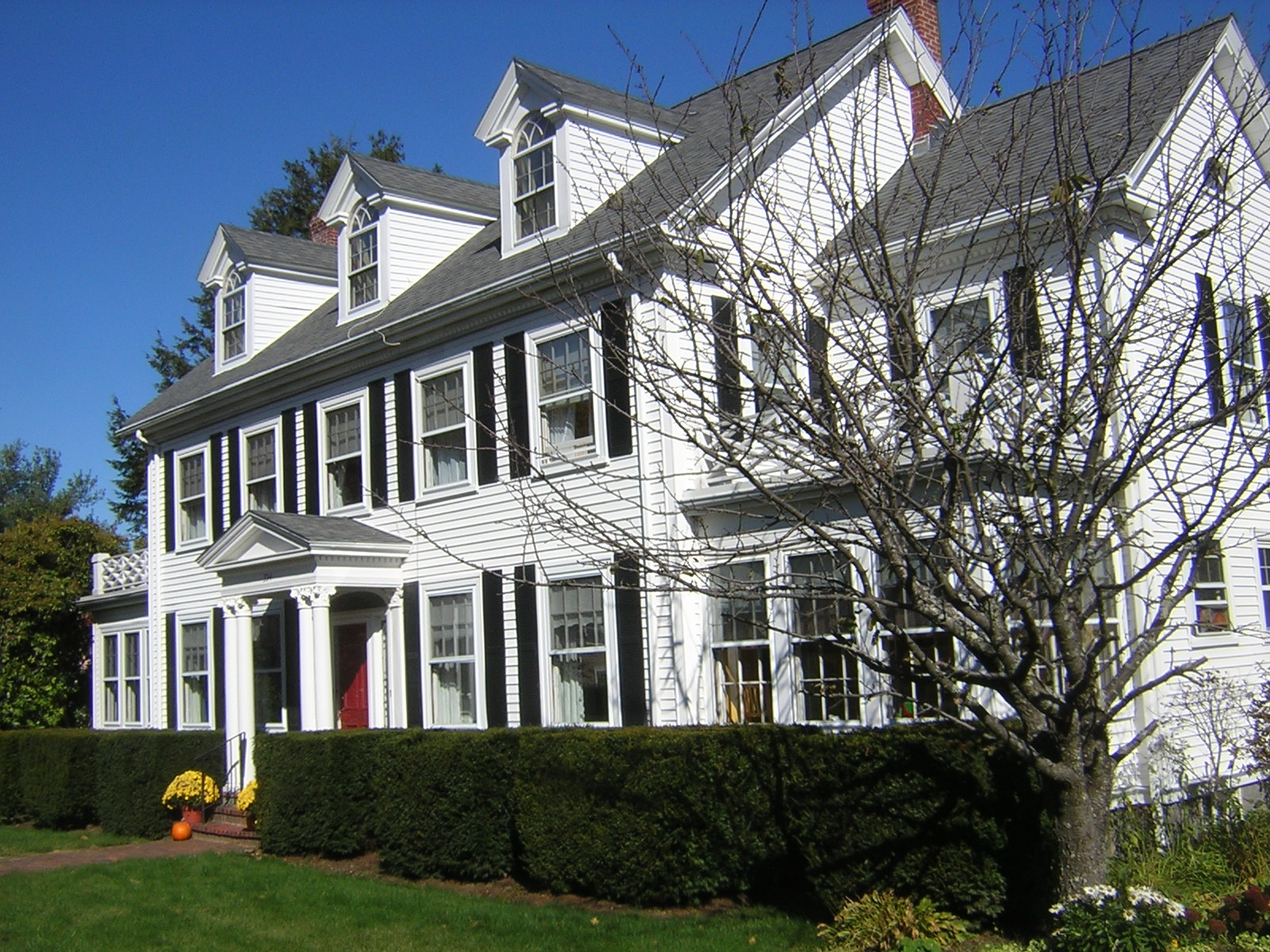

- Location within Massachusetts Location within the United States
- Location: 354 Highland Avenue, Quincy, Massachusetts
- Coordinates: 42°15′38″N 71°1′15.5″W
- Built: 1923
- Architect: Chapman, William
- Architectural style: Colonial Revival
- MPS: Quincy MRA
- NRHP reference No.: 89001353
- Added to NRHP: September 20, 1989

The Alfred H. Richards House is a historic house located at 354 Highland Avenue in Quincy, Massachusetts, United States.

== Description and history ==
The two-story wood-framed house was built in 1923 for Alfred Richards, a bank executive. It is one of the last house built in the Wollaston Heights area, which had been mostly built out in the earlier decades of the 20th century. Designed by William Chapman, it has a five-bay main facade with three gabled dormers above, each with a round-arch window. The eave is decorated with dentil moulding and modillions.

The house was listed on the National Register of Historic Places on September 20, 1989.

== See also ==
- National Register of Historic Places listings in Quincy, Massachusetts
