= Charles Duncan (British Army soldier) =

Recipient of the George Cross

- Born: 13 April 1920; Bexhill-on-Sea, Sussex, England
- Died: 10 July 1943 (aged 23); Tunisia
- Burial place: Enfidaville War Cemetery, Tunisia
- Military career
- Allegiance: United Kingdom
- Branch: British Army
- Rank: Private
- Service number: 6287023
- Unit: 4th Battalion, Parachute Regiment
- Conflicts: Second World War
- Awards: George Cross

Charles Alfred Duncan, GC (13 April 1920 – 10 July 1943) was a soldier in the British Army's Parachute Regiment who was posthumously awarded the George Cross during the Second World War.

Duncan was born in Bexhill-on-Sea on 13 April 1920. He was a member of the Signal Platoon in the 4th Battalion of the Parachute Regiment. On 10 July 1943, in M'Saken, Tunisia, his squad had been removing the fuses from their grenades in a confined area after the postponement of a parachute operation in Sicily when a live device was dropped on the ground. Duncan retrieved it, found the pin was out and the fuse burning and dropped on the grenade to shield his fellows from the inevitable blast. Duncan was posthumously awarded the George Cross for the self-sacrifice he showed by throwing himself on a grenade. Notice of his award appeared in The London Gazette on 9 November 1943.

He is buried in Enfidaville War Cemetery in Enfidaville, Tunisia. His medal was presented to the Airborne Forces Museum at Aldershot in 1972.
