= Porterhouse =

Porterhouse can refer to:

- Porterhouse (horse), American Champion race horse
- Porterhouse Brewery
- Porter House New York, a steakhouse in New York City
- Porterhouse steak
- Porterhouse, a fictional Cambridge college in the novel Porterhouse Blue by Tom Sharpe
