= Osmyn and Emily Deuel House =

- U.S. National Register of Historic Places
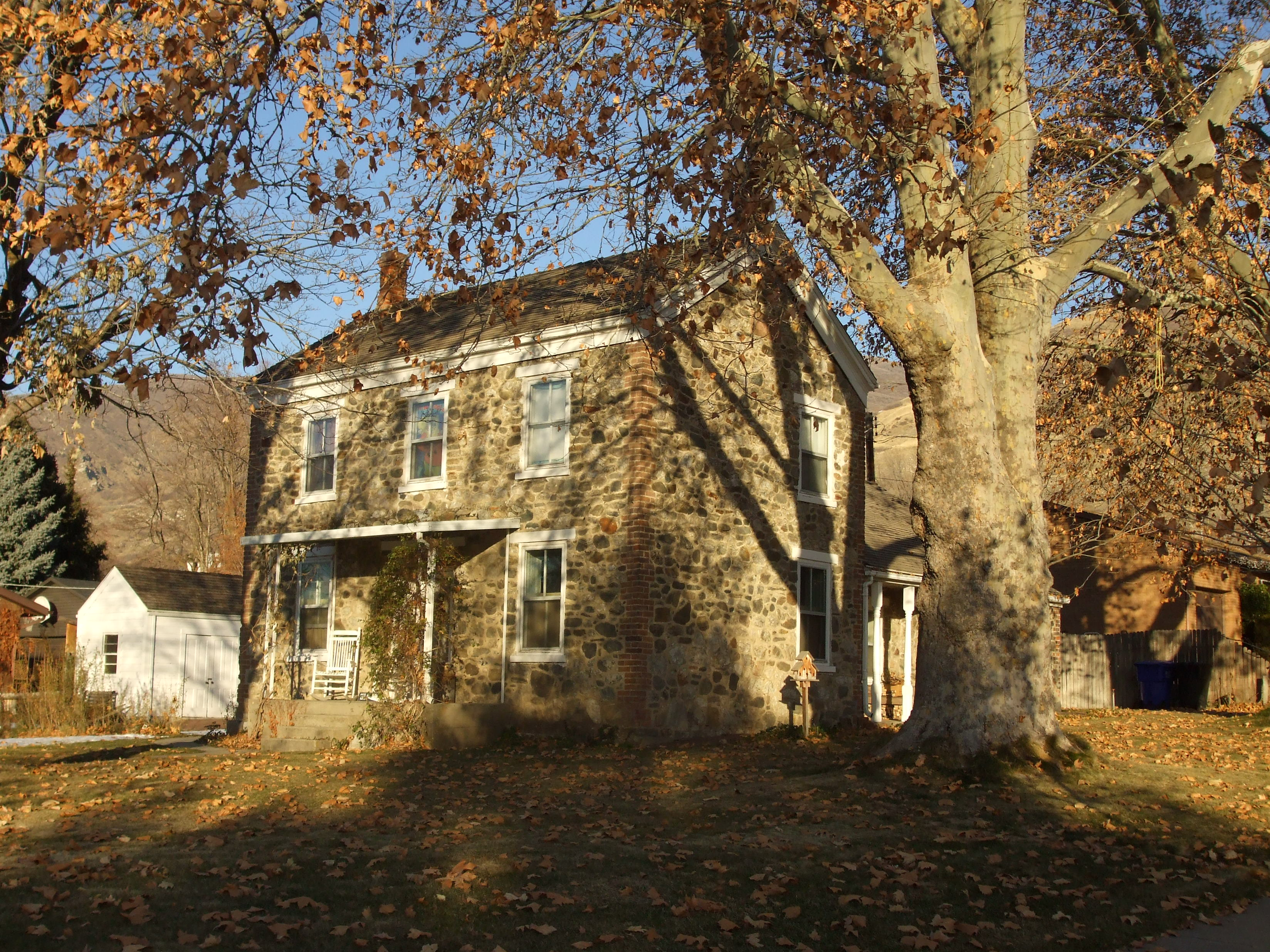

- Location within Utah Location within the United States
- Location: 271 South 200 East, Centerville, Utah
- Coordinates: 40°54′53″N 111°52′31″W
- Area: 0.2 acres (0.081 ha)
- Built: 1878
- Built by: Charles Duncan and Sons
- MPS: Centerville MPS
- NRHP reference No.: 97001311
- Added to NRHP: November 17, 1997

The Osmyn and Emily Deuel House, at 271 South 200 East in Centerville, Utah, was listed on the National Register of Historic Places in 1997.

It is a two-story stone house built around 1878, with a one-and-a-half-story rear addition around 1900. It faces west, and has a north-facing porch. It was probably built by local masons Charles Duncan and his sons.

It was built for Osmyn Merritt Deuel and his fourth wife Emily Hannah Bowers.
