= Nathan T. and Anna Porter House =

- U.S. National Register of Historic Places
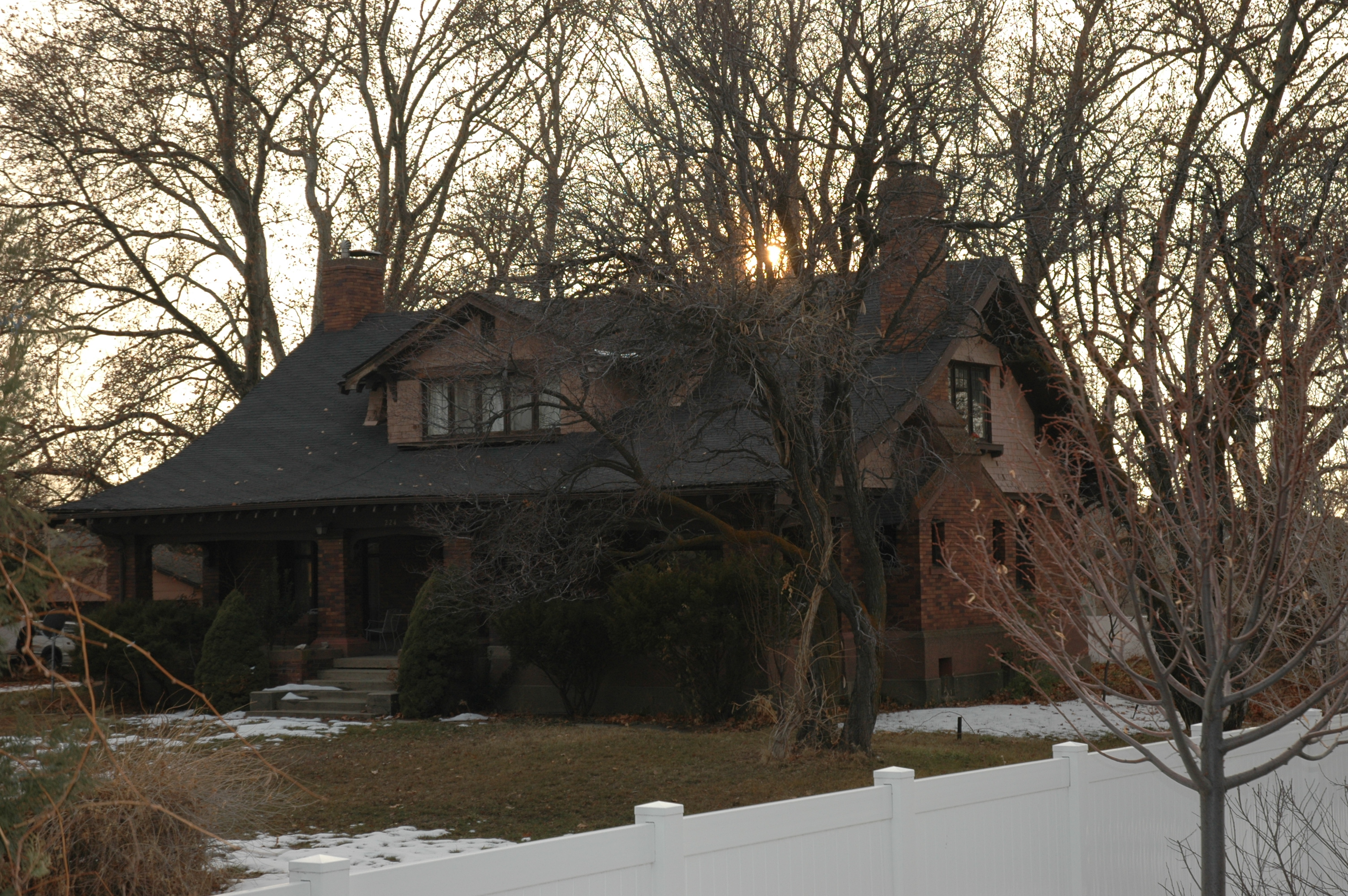

- Location within Utah Location within the United States
- Location: 224 South 210 West, Centerville, Utah
- Coordinates: 40°54′55″N 111°52′55″W
- Area: 1.6 acres (0.65 ha)
- Built: 1915
- Architectural style: Bungalow/craftsman
- MPS: Centreville MRA
- NRHP reference No.: 03001482
- Added to NRHP: January 21, 2004

The Nathan T. and Anna Porter House, at 224 South 210 West in Centerville, Utah, was built in 1915. It was listed on the National Register of Historic Places in 2004.

It was deemed significant in part as a "fine example of an Arts and Crafts-style bungalow - one of only two contributing Craftsman bungalows in Centerville."

A historic garage is a second contributing building on the property.
