= Richards Mansion (Georgetown, Delaware) =

Historic mansion located at Georgetown, Delaware, USA

- U.S. National Register of Historic Places
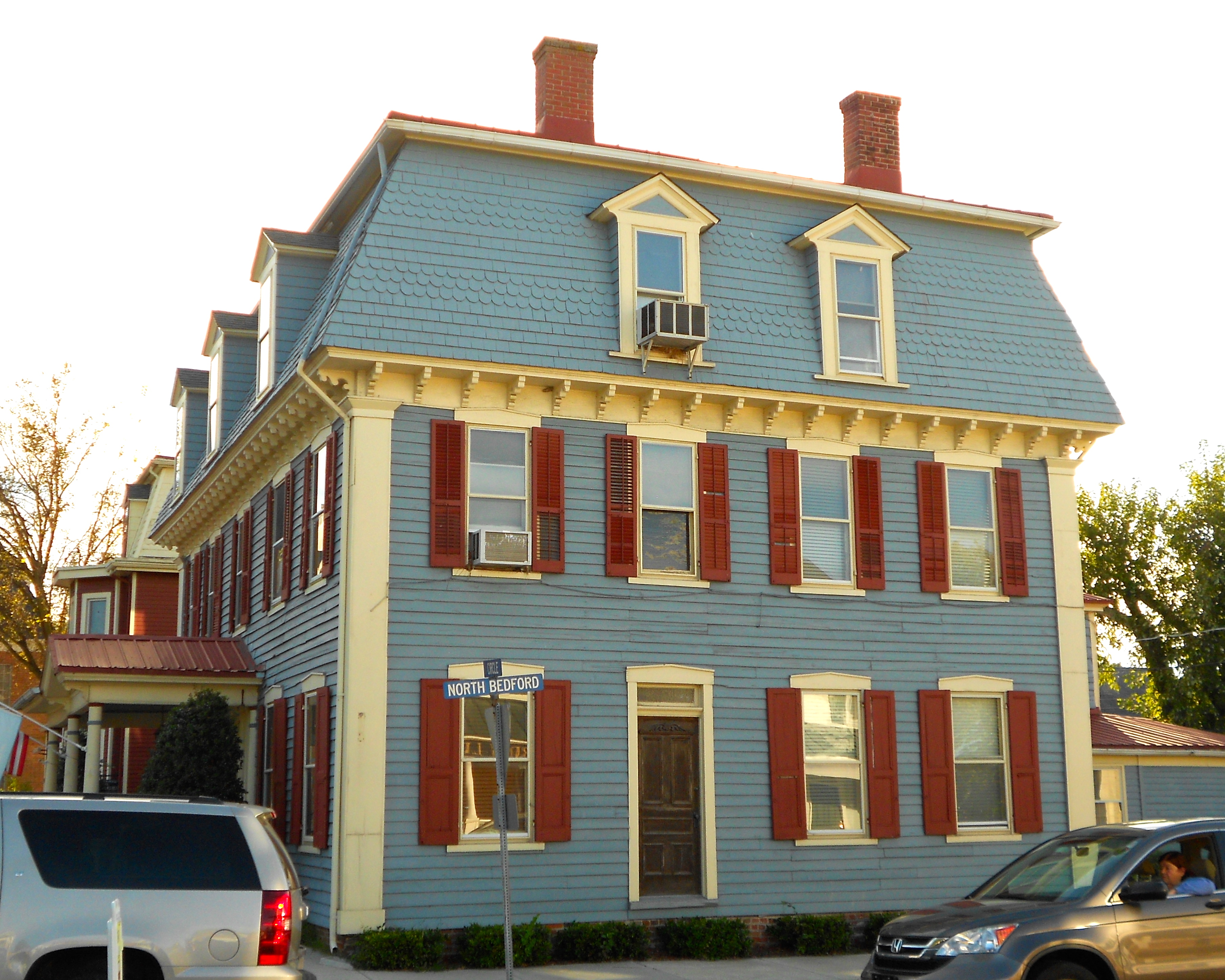

- Location within Delaware Location within the United States
- Location: N. Bedford St. and the Circle, Georgetown, Delaware
- Coordinates: 38°41′26″N 75°23′13″W
- Area: less than one acre
- Built: 1796, 1835-1845, 1883
- Architectural style: Greek Revival, Other, Federal, Mansard
- NRHP reference No.: 79000648
- Added to NRHP: July 26, 1979

Richards Mansion, also known as The Mansion House, is a historic mansion located at Georgetown, Sussex County, Delaware. The oldest section was built between 1796 and 1799, and is a two-story, four-bay, single pile Federal style structure that is now the rear wing. The main house was built between 1835 and 1845, and is a three-story, five-bay, frame structure in the Greek Revival style. The third floor was added in 1883, with the addition of a mansard roof in the Second Empire style.

The site was added to the National Register of Historic Places in 1979.
