= Richards House (Farmington, Utah) =

- U.S. National Register of Historic Places
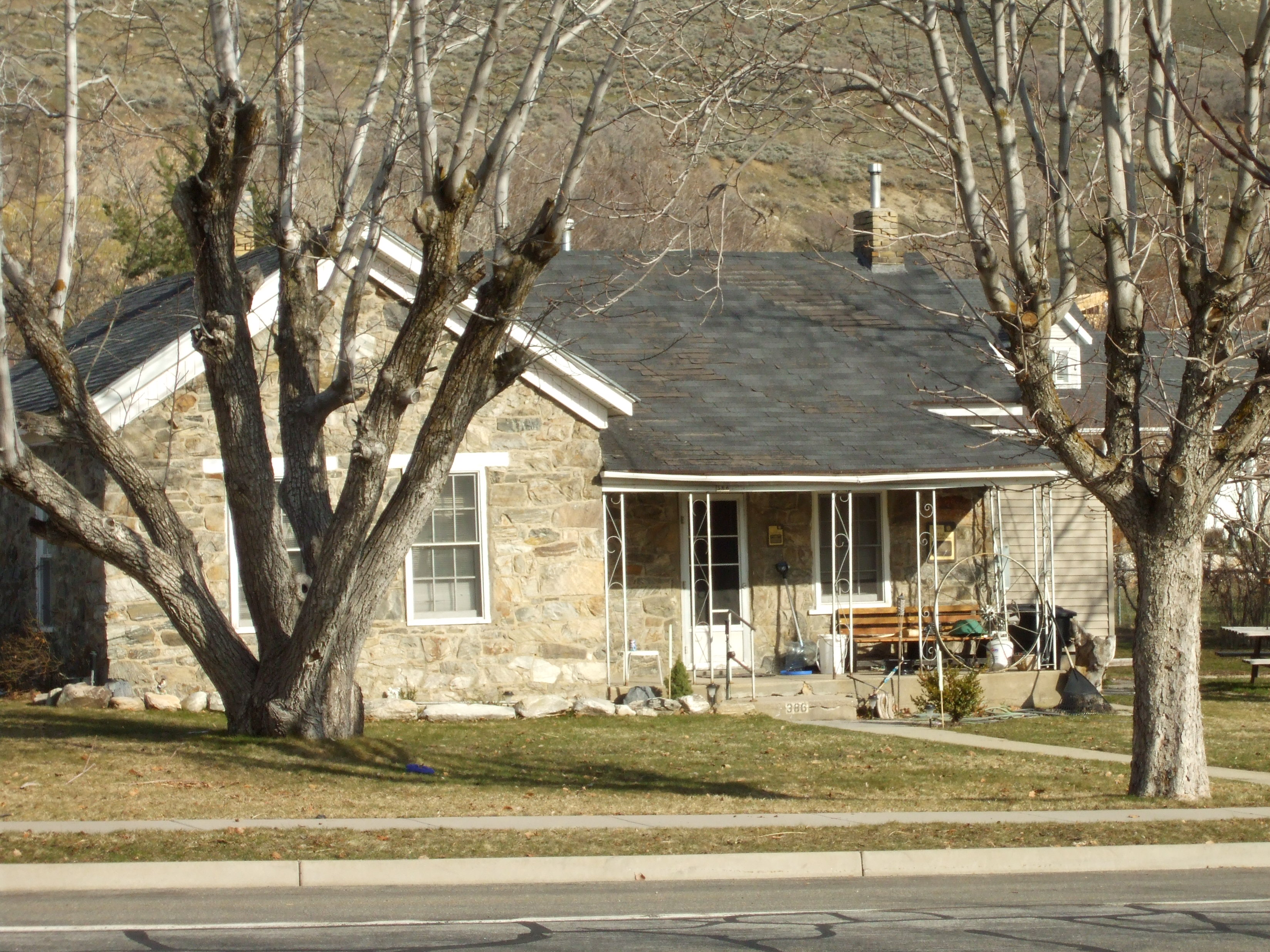

- Location within Utah Location within the United States
- Location: 386 N. 100 East, Farmington, Utah
- Coordinates: 40°59′12″N 111°53′02″W
- Area: less than one acre
- Built: c.1860
- Built by: Franklin D. Richards
- Architectural style: Vernacular, T-shaped
- NRHP reference No.: 77001303
- Added to NRHP: December 23, 1977

The Richards House, at 386 N. 100 East in Farmington, Utah, was built in the early 1860s. It was listed on the National Register of Historic Places in 1977.

It was built as a one-story, three-room stone house, with a T-shaped plan. It was built of multicolored local igneous stone, put together in a random rubble pattern. It has a plain cornice and frieze, and has simple lintels and sills, all made of plain wood.

It was built by Franklin D. Richards for his plural wife Rhoda H. Foss Richards, who lived in the home until her death in 1881.
