= Holland–Smith–Brown House =

- U.S. National Register of Historic Places
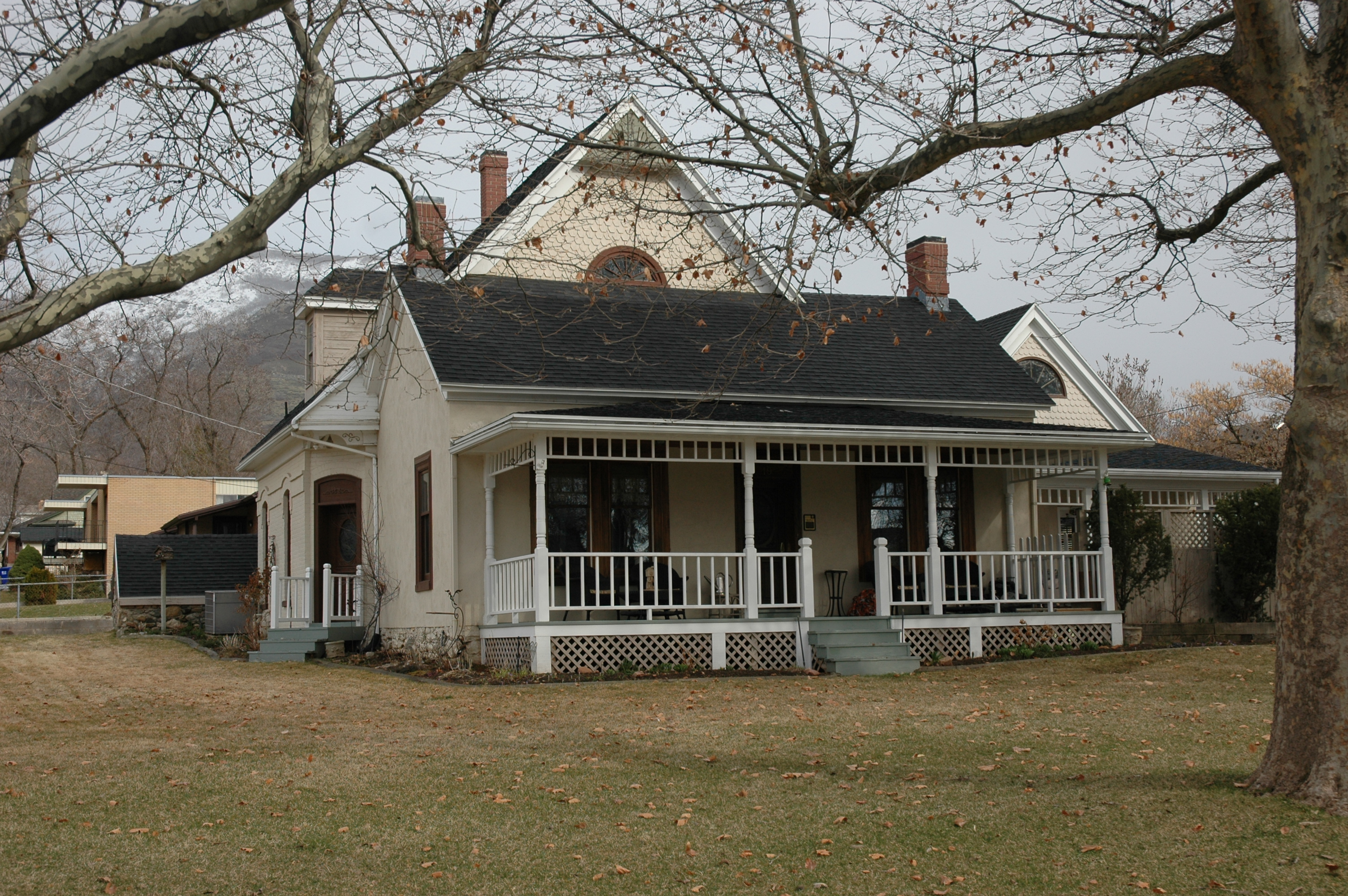

- Location within Utah Location within the United States
- Location: 19 South 200 East, Centerville, Utah
- Coordinates: 40°55′01″N 111°52′31″W
- Area: less than one acre
- Built: c.1872, c.1890s, 1986
- Built by: Holland, John
- MPS: Centerville MPS
- NRHP reference No.: 97001315
- Added to NRHP: November 17, 1997

The Holland–Smith–Brown House, at 19 South 200 East in Centerville, Utah, was built in 1872. It was listed on the National Register of Historic Places in 1997.

It is a one-and-one-half-story brick Victorian style house built originally as a one-story hall-parlor house with a symmetric facade. A front porch was added probably during expansion of the house to the rear in the 1890s.

It was built by John Holland (b.1836), an immigrant from Staffordshire, England who came to America in 1844 with his parents, and to Utah in 1850.
