= Mormonism and Freemasonry =

Overview of Masonic tendencies in Latter Day Saintism

The relationship between Mormonism and Freemasonry began early in the life of Joseph Smith, founder of the Latter Day Saint movement, and includes similarities between Mormon and Masonic rituals, such as elements of the endowment ceremony and stories of recovered ancient records. Smith was claimed to have stated that Mormonism had "true Masonry"; other leaders like Brigham Young said Masonic rituals were an "apostate endowment" corrupted from the rites given in Solomon's Temple that Smith had restored to its original form. Smith's older brother Hyrum joined Masonry in the 1820s, and his father, Joseph, Sr., may have been one as well while the family lived near Palmyra, New York. In the late 1820s, the western New York region was swept with anti-Masonic fervor.

By the 1840s, Smith and most Latter Day Saints (including but not limited to many in Church leadership) had become Freemasons and joined the Masonic lodge in Nauvoo, Illinois. Soon after joining Freemasonry in March 1842, Smith introduced the temple ceremony referred to as the endowment which included a number of symbolic elements that were very similar to those in Freemasonry. Smith remained a Freemason until his death. In modern times, the Church of Jesus Christ of Latter-day Saints (LDS Church) has stated that its members may become Freemasons, and Freemasonry allows them to join.

== Historical connections ==
A significant number of leaders in the early Latter Day Saint movement were Masons prior to their involvement in the movement, including Heber C. Kimball and John C. Bennett.

Joseph's brother, Hyrum, was a Freemason; their father, Joseph, Sr. has also been stated to have been a Freemason: That Joseph, Sr was a Freemason, however, is currently in dispute, as there were eight other men named "Joseph Smith" living in the same county (Ontario County, New York) as he was at the time that he supposedly joined the Lodge.

On 15 October 1841, Abraham Jonas (then the Grand Master of the Grand Lodge AF&AM of Illinois) issued a dispensation empowering a Lodge in Nauvoo and appointing the following Latter Day Saints to be its officers: George Miller as its first Worshipful Master, John Parker as its first Senior Warden, and Lucius Scovil as its first Junior Warden. The Lodge met on 29 December 1841 and accepted this dispensation. Officers were elected and appointed, and bylaws written and adopted. On 17 February 1842, the Lodge voted to hold off on installing its officers until 15 March; a request was also sent to Grand Master Jonas for him to preside over that Installation, which he accepted. Joseph Smith Jr (who was not yet a Mason) was appointed to serve in a pro-tempore position as Grand Installing Chaplain for this Installation. He and Sidney Rigdon were initiated as Entered Apprentices in the evening after the Installation, thereby becoming members of the newly-formed Nauvoo lodge; Abraham Jonas presided over that degree ceremony.

It appears that John C. Bennett had a particularly strong influence in the spread of Freemasonry among the Mormons. Within the year, there were over 300 Masons in Nauvoo Lodge, which resulted in Meredith Helm (the then-Grand Master who had succeeded Jonas) to issue dispensations to form two other Lodges in the Spring of 1843. One was called Nye Lodge (named for Rev. Jonathan Nye, who had previously served as Grand Master of the Grand Lodge of Vermont from 1815 to 1817 and as Grand Master of the Grand Encampment of Knights Templar, USA from 1829 to 1835) and Helm Lodge (named for the Grand Master who issued this dispensation).

Soon after this, over 1,500 Mormon men in the city of Nauvoo were practicing Masons.

"By 1840, John Cook Bennett, a former active leader in Masonry had arrived in Commerce and rapidly exerted his persuasive leadership in all facets of the Church, including Mormon Masonry. … Joseph and Sidney [Rigdon] were inducted into formal Masonry … on the same day …" being made "Masons on Sight" by the Illinois Grandmaster. This freed Joseph from having to complete the ritual and memorization necessary to work one's way through the first three degrees.) Making one "A Mason on Sight" is generally reserved as an honor and is a rarity in occurrence.

Smith and Rigdon were raised to the third degree of Master Mason "on sight" by Grand Master Jonas of the Grand Lodge of Illinois. At the time and in the jurisdiction of that Grand Lodge, this meant that Joseph and Sidney could go through the three degree ceremonies in a relatively short time without having to prove their respective proficiencies between each degree. They each were passed to the degree of Fellowcraft on the morning of 16 March 1842 and raised to the degree of Master Mason later that day. Smith wrote: "Wednesday, March 16. — I was with the Masonic Lodge and rose to the sublime degree.

Note that Joseph Smith's journal does not mention the sublime degree on Mar 16, 1842, stating only "Continued with the Lodge". However, minutes from the Nauvoo lodge on the same day do state, "Joseph Smith applied for the third and sublime degree...he was duly raised..."

On 17 March 1842, the Relief Society was established as an auxiliary group for the female members of the church. Its structure originally had similarities to that of the Masonic Lodge; however, the Relief Society never had its own degree ceremonies nor did it ever purport to confer degrees of any kind on its members.

Hyrum Smith was not only one of Joseph's older brothers but also succeeded their father as Presiding Patriarch and Cowdery as Assistant President of the Church.

Bodley Lodge No. 1 in Quincy, IL presented concerns that the special dispensation granted to Nauvoo Lodge, U.D., was improper, and on August 11, 1842, the special dispensation was suspended by Grand Master Abraham Jonas until the annual Communication of the Illinois Grand Lodge. "During the short period covering its activities, this Lodge initiated 286 candidates and raised almost as many. John C. Bennett reports an instance in which 63 persons were elected on a single ballot." This suspension was later lifted and the Mormon Lodges resumed work although several irregularities in their practice were noted. The irregularities centered on mass balloting (voting on more than one candidate at a time) and not requiring proficiency in each degree before proceeding to the next degree (in many cases, initiates were being passed to the Fellowcraft degree and raised to the Master Mason degree within two days of being initiated as an Entered Apprentice).

There were 5 Masonic Lodges in Mormon communities by April 27, 1843:

- Nauvoo Lodge, U.D. (Nauvoo, IL)
- Helm Lodge, U.D. (Nauvoo, IL)
- Nye Lodge, U.D. (Nauvoo, IL)
- Rising Sun Lodge No.12 (Montrose, IA)
- Keokuk Lodge, U.D. (Keokuk, IA)
  - This Lodge is also referenced in some records and studies as "Eagle Lodge"; however, this is incorrect, as Eagle Lodge was a separate Lodge in Iowa created by the Grand Lodge of Iowa on 23 April 1846.

There were eventually 1,492 members of these lodges, but only a total of 414 Masons in all the other Illinois lodges. A resolution passed in the Grand Lodge of Illinois on October 3, 1843 to revoke the charter of Rising Sun Lodge, revoke the dispensations of and refuse to provide charters for the rest of these Lodges.

Rising Sun Lodge's charter was suspended because of refusal to pay dues to the Grand Lodge and because of doing its Masonic work irregularly. Nauvoo Lodge's dispensation was revoked due to irregular Masonic work, failure to bring its record books to the Grand Lodge for inspection, making men Masons without regard to character, and not requiring candidates to become proficient in one degree before advancing to another. Helm Lodge's dispensation was revoked due to irregular Masonic work (particularly "acting on four petitions in one day"), pushing candidates from the first degree to the third within two-day time periods, failure to present their records to the Grand Lodge for inspection, and paying only a portion of its dues to the Grand Lodge. Nye Lodge's dispensation was revoked for the same reasons as Helm Lodge and for initiating candidates within only one day of receiving their petitions (which did not leave any time for petitions to be examined or investigated). Keokuk Lodge's dispensation was revoked for irregular Masonic work and for allowing petitions to be received and acted upon "within one lunar month."

Following this resolution, Grand Master Alexander Dunlap later sent a representative of the Grand Lodge to Nauvoo Lodge to revoke its dispensation. According to the records of the Grand Lodge, its representative was "treated with contempt," the Lodge refused to part with its charter, and the Lodge stated that they would continue to do Masonic work. Because of this, a resolution in the Grand Lodge of Illinois passed on October 10, 1844 that withdrew all fellowship with Nauvoo Lodge, Helm Lodge, Nye Lodge, and all members thereof; that the Masons working in these Lodges be considered clandestine (or illegitimate), and that all members thereof be suspended from the privileges of Masonry in Illinois. The Lodge in Keokuk seems not to have been given the courtesy of being properly informed by the Grand Lodge of its charter being revoked or its members suspended following the 1843 resolution.

Although their respective charter and dispensation were revoked, Keokuk Lodge and Rising Sun Lodge were shortly afterward considered by the Grand Lodge of Illinois to be under the jurisdiction of the Grand Lodge of Iowa (as the Grand Lodge of Iowa was constituted in January 1844). These two Lodges attempted to join the Grand Lodge of Iowa at the 1844 Annual Communication; the Grand Lodge of Iowa voted that such would be permitted so long as these Lodges first present certificates of good standing issued by the Grand Secretary of the Grand Lodge of Illinois. At the Grand Lodge of Iowa's 1845 Annual Communication, word was given from Grand Secretary of the Grand Lodge of Illinois that Rising Sun's charter had been revoked and Keokuk had been refused a charter, both for "gross, unmasonic conduct." Finally, at the Grand Lodge of Iowa's 1847 Annual Communication, while discussing the topic of "clandestine" (or "illegitimate") Lodges, it was decided that, as neither Rising Sun Lodge nor Keokuk Lodge had ever produced such certificates of good standing and had not contacted the Grand Secretary of the Grand Lodge of Iowa since 1844, neither Lodge could ever be a part of the Grand Lodge of Iowa.

It is theorized that, when Smith was in Carthage Jail in 1844, after he fired his last round in a small pepper-box pistol, he ran to the window and held up his arms in what may have been a Masonic call of distress, hoping Masons in the contingent would honor this call and not fire on him. It is recorded that he ran towards the open window with uplifted hands, and proclaimed, "O Lord my God." The Warsaw Signal (the local newspaper based where those indicted for the conspiracy to murder Joseph and Hyrum resided), on the other hand, shortly afterwards wrote—and was later quoted by other newspapers at the time—that Joseph's last words were "Oh my God!" There is no evidence that any Masons participated in the attack on Carthage Jail (aside from the four victims of the attack; namely, Joseph Smith, Jr, Hyrum Smith, John Taylor, and Willard Richards). Three of the five men who were later indicted for conspiring to murder Smith were later initiated as Freemasons in Warsaw Lodge: Levi Williams, Thomas Sharp, and Jacob Davis.

Because Freemasonry requires its members to be law-abiding citizens, this resulted in the Grand Lodge of Illinois initiating an investigation into improper conduct of Warsaw Lodge. Warsaw Lodge later relinquished their charter (which allowed it to meet and work as a Masonic Lodge) to the Grand Lodge of Illinois, citing lack of space as the reason why they did not want to meet anymore; since their meeting space was never an issue prior to the investigation, many assume that Warsaw Lodge used this as a pretext to avoid investigation and save face. There are claims that Mark Aldrich, another of the five men who were indicted for conspiracy to murder, was already a Mason of Warsaw Lodge. These five men were cleared of all wrongdoing by the courts.

The Lodge in Nauvoo continued its activities until April 10, 1845, when Brigham Young and George A. Smith advised Lucius Scovil to suspend the work of the Masons in Nauvoo. Only a few additional meetings were held prior to departure of those who followed Young to the Great Basin in 1846 after the succession crisis.

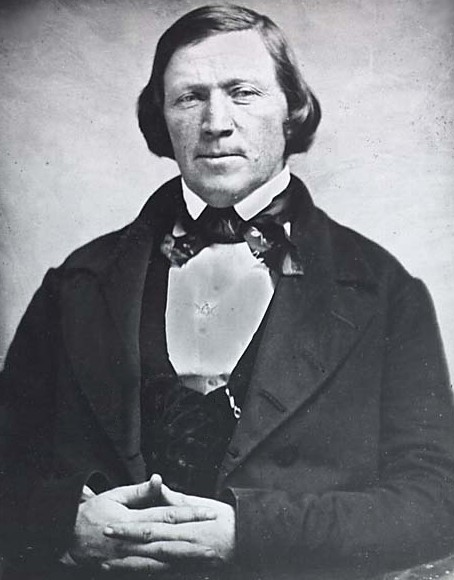
Brigham Young, 2nd president of the LDS Church, with a Masonic Square-and-Compasses stickpin in the middle of his shirt.

After arriving to the Great Basin, some Latter-day Saints who were Masons sent requests for dispensations to other Grand Lodge jurisdictions in the hopes of being able to meet regularly as a Lodge. Such requests were sent to the United Grand Lodge of England (UGLE) and to one of the Grand Lodges in Mexico; the UGLE never received the letter, and the Grand Lodge in Mexico denied the request.

From 1872 until 1925, the Grand Lodge of Utah had an informal ban against Latter-day Saints due to the question of polygamy. Polygamy was a federal crime and, although the LDS Church had issued a prohibition against the practice in 1890, it was believed by many outside of the Church that it still practiced polygamy in secret.

In 1925, the Grand Lodge of Utah adopted a formal ban against members of the LDS Church (including church members who had already become Freemasons under other recognized grand lodge jurisdictions)—no reason was given except that the church was not compatible with Freemasonry; after failed attempts in 1927, 1965, and 1983, this ban was finally repealed in 1984. In 2008, a Latter-day Saint served as the Grand Lodge's first LDS Grand Master; it was estimated that he was the first Latter-day Saint to serve as Grand Master of any jurisdiction in approximately 100 years.

== Prophets and Apostles who were Freemasons ==
At least the first five presidents of the LDS Church are confirmed to have gone through the three degrees of Freemasonry. Below is a table of dates and sources for each of those five for each degree:

LDS Church Presidents' Masonic Ceremony Dates
President	Entered Apprentice (1°)	Fellowcraft (2°)	Master Mason (3°)
Joseph Smith Jr	15 March 1842	16 March 1842	16 March 1842
Brigham Young	7 April 1842	8 April 1842	9 April 1842
John Taylor	22 April 1842	29 April 1842	30 April 1842
Wilford Woodruff	26 April 1842	28 April 1842	29 April 1842
Lorenzo Snow	5 June 1843	7 June 1843	11 November 1843

They had all joined while living in Nauvoo, Illinois, bringing the practice westward when the Saints migrated to Utah.

Although Lorenzo Snow also went through the degree ceremonies in Nauvoo Lodge, his initiation occurred after Nauvoo Lodge's dispensation had been suspended by the Grand Lodge of Illinois in the spring of that year; in October of that year, the dispensation was revoked. He therefore would not have been considered a regular (legitimate) Mason by the mainstream Masonic community, as his initiation—as well as his passing and raising, for that matter—was done by a Lodge acting without a dispensation.

A number of early apostles of the Church were also Freemasons. Most of the apostles who were members of the Fraternity joined it by going through the degrees in Nauvoo Lodge; a couple of others had become Masons previously in other Lodges, and joined Nauvoo Lodge either as founding members (meaning that they were the first members of the Lodge when it was formed) or by affiliation (meaning that they transferred their Masonic membership after Nauvoo Lodge had been formed).

LDS Church Apostles of Nauvoo Lodge
Apostle	Entered Apprentice (1°)	Fellowcraft (2°)	Master Mason (3°)	Joined from Another Lodge	Previous Lodge	Previous Jurisdiction
Heber C. Kimball (Founding Member)	N/A	N/A	N/A	29 December 1841	Victor Lodge No. 303	Grand Lodge of New York
Orson Hyde (Affiliated Member)	N/A	N/A	18 January 1843	14 January 1843	Meridian Orb Lodge No. 10	Grand Lodge of Ohio
Parley P. Pratt	10 July 1843	13 July 1843	30 July 1844	N/A	N/A	N/A
Orson Pratt	25 February 1843	23 March 1843	11 April 1843	N/A	N/A	N/A
Lyman E. Johnson	20 April 1842	21 April 1842; 16 June 1842	(Record not found)	N/A	N/A	N/A
John E Page	21 April 1842	22 April 1842	23 April 1842	N/A	N/A	N/A
George A Smith	14 May 1842	16 May 1842; 19 May 1842	21 May 1842	N/A	N/A	N/A
Willard Richards	7 April 1842	8 April 1842	9 April 1842	N/A	N/A	N/A
Lyman Wight	25 April 1842	27 April 1842	28 April 1842	N/A	N/A	N/A
Amasa Lyman	8 April 1842	11 April 1842	12 April 1842	N/A	N/A	N/A
Ezra T. Benson	28 April 1842	20 May 1842	21 May 1842	N/A	N/A	N/A
Charles C. Rich	16 April 1842	18 April 1842	28 April 1842	N/A	N/A	N/A
Erastus Snow	11 December 1843	14 December 1843	22 December 1843	N/A	N/A	N/A
Franklin D. Richards	1 April 1843	18 April 1843	29 April 1843	N/A	N/A	N/A
Albert Carrington	6 July 1844	6 July 1844	22 July 1844	N/A	N/A	N/A

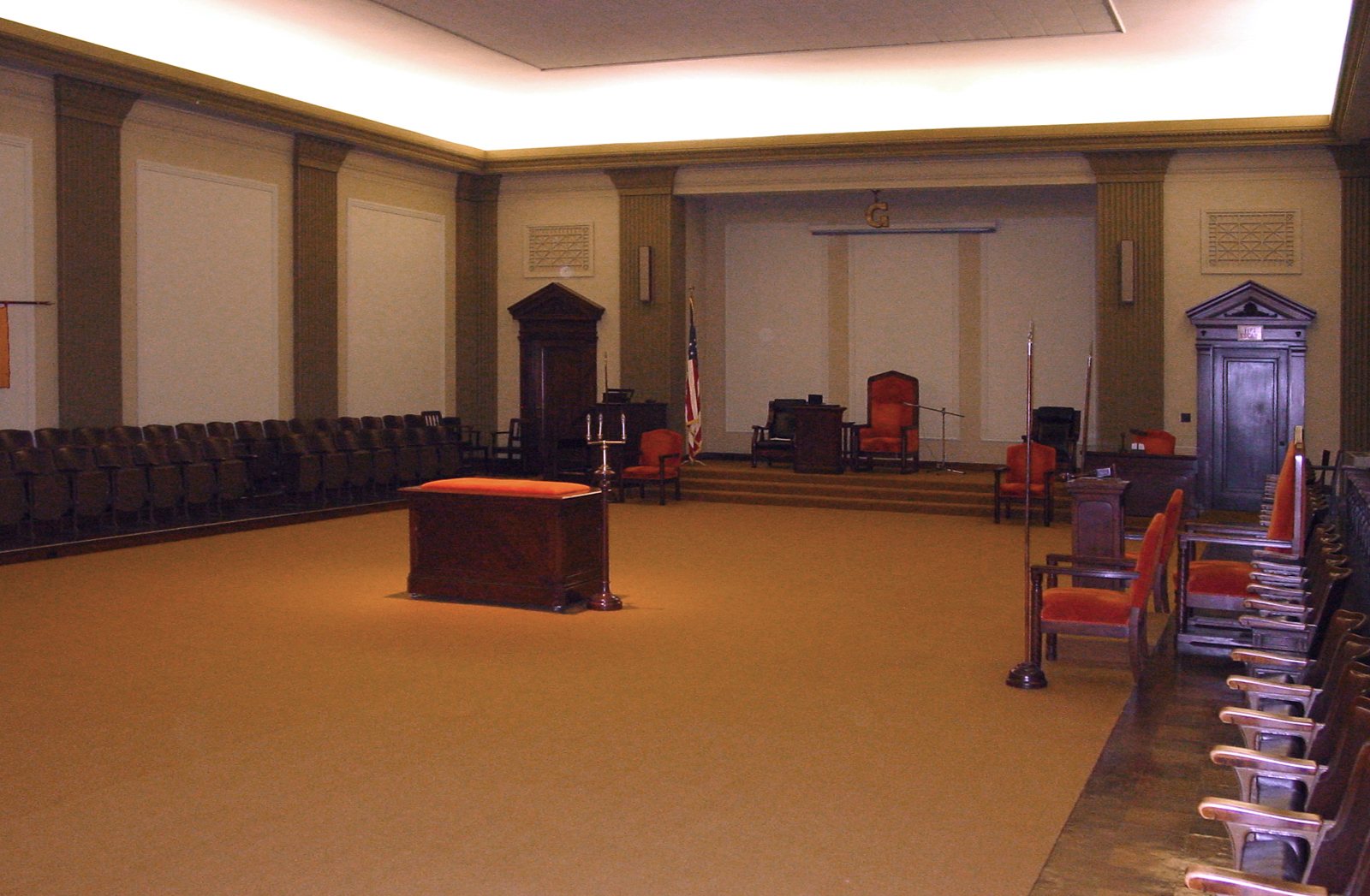
One of two Lodge rooms at the Masonic Temple in Freeport, Illinois. Throughout a Craft Lodge's tyled meeting, a Volume of Sacred Law (typically a copy of the Holy Bible) is placed open upon the altar. The Chaplain will kneel at the altar in prayer to open and to close the meeting.

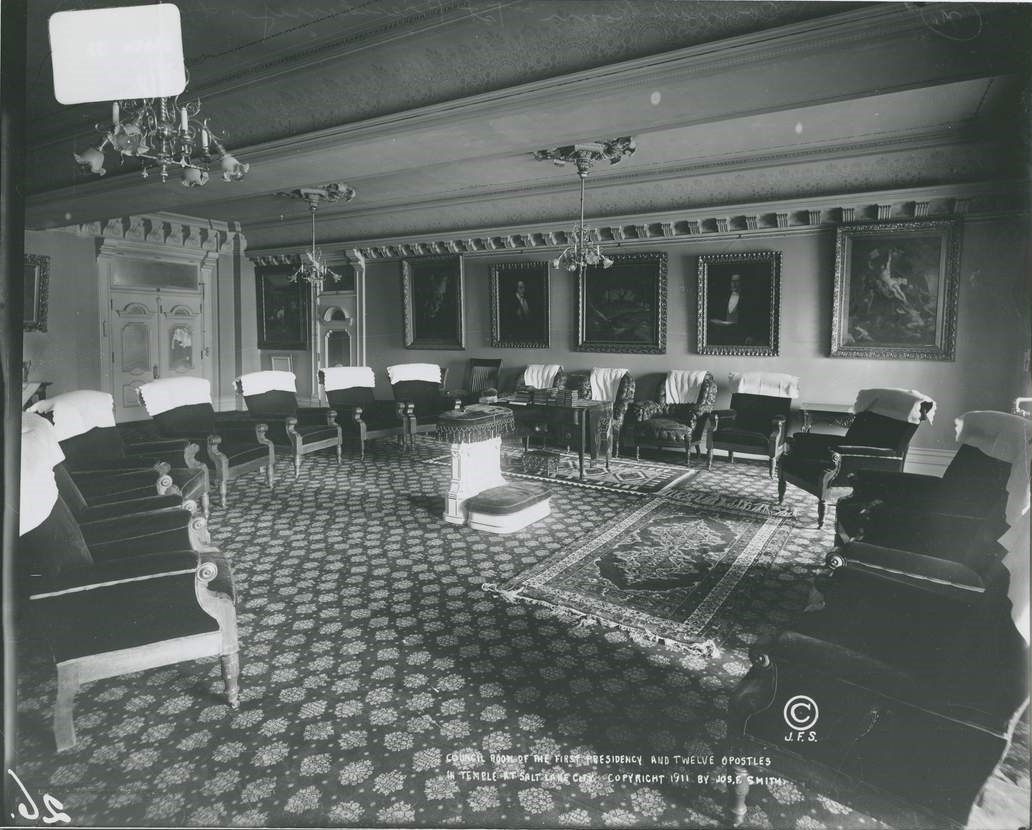
Council Room of the First Presidency and the Twelve Apostles, Salt Lake Temple, 1911.

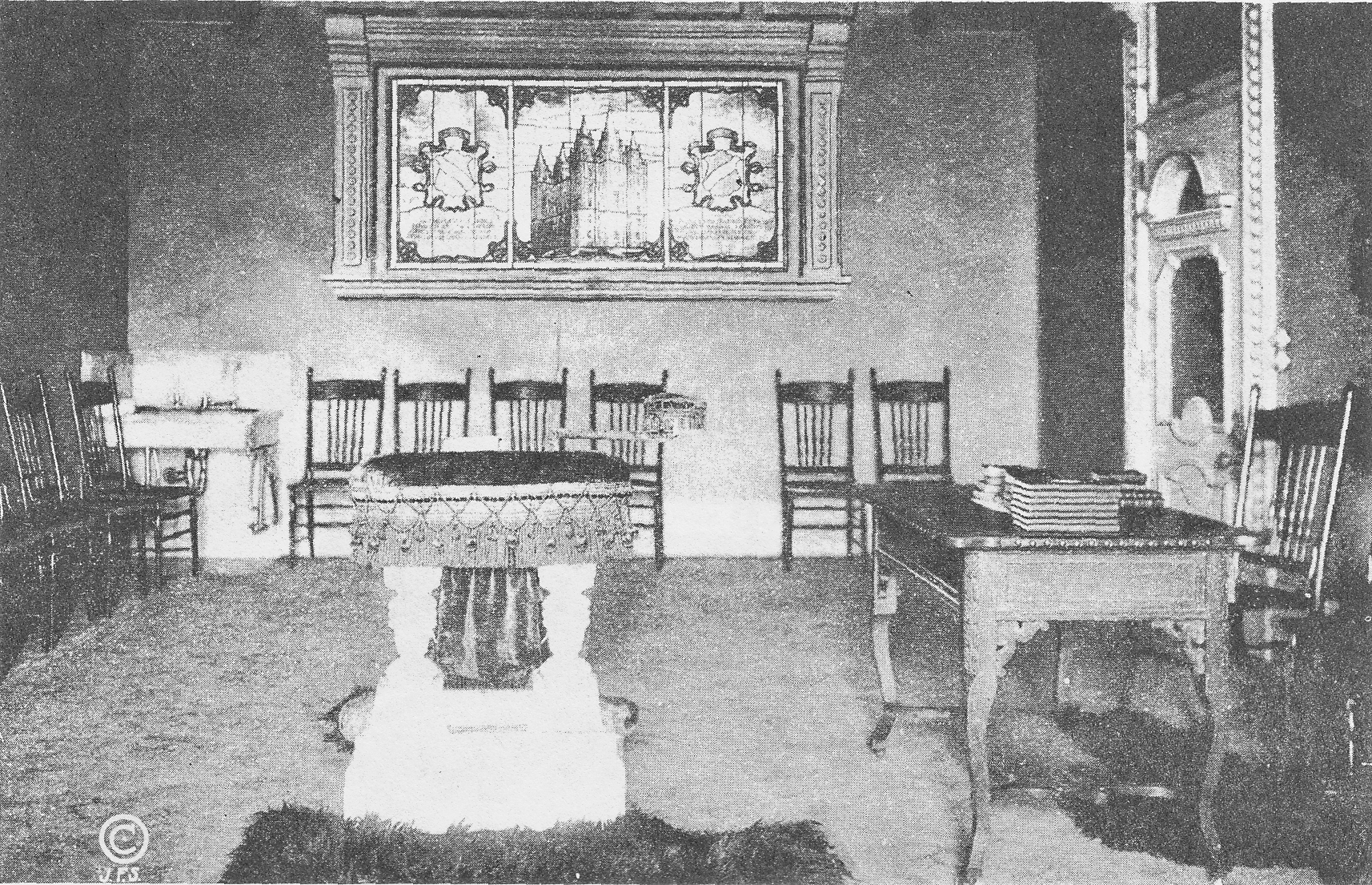
High Council Chamber, Salt Lake Temple, 1911. This room was used by several nearby Stake Presidencies and High Councils in the Church for devotion and spiritual instruction.

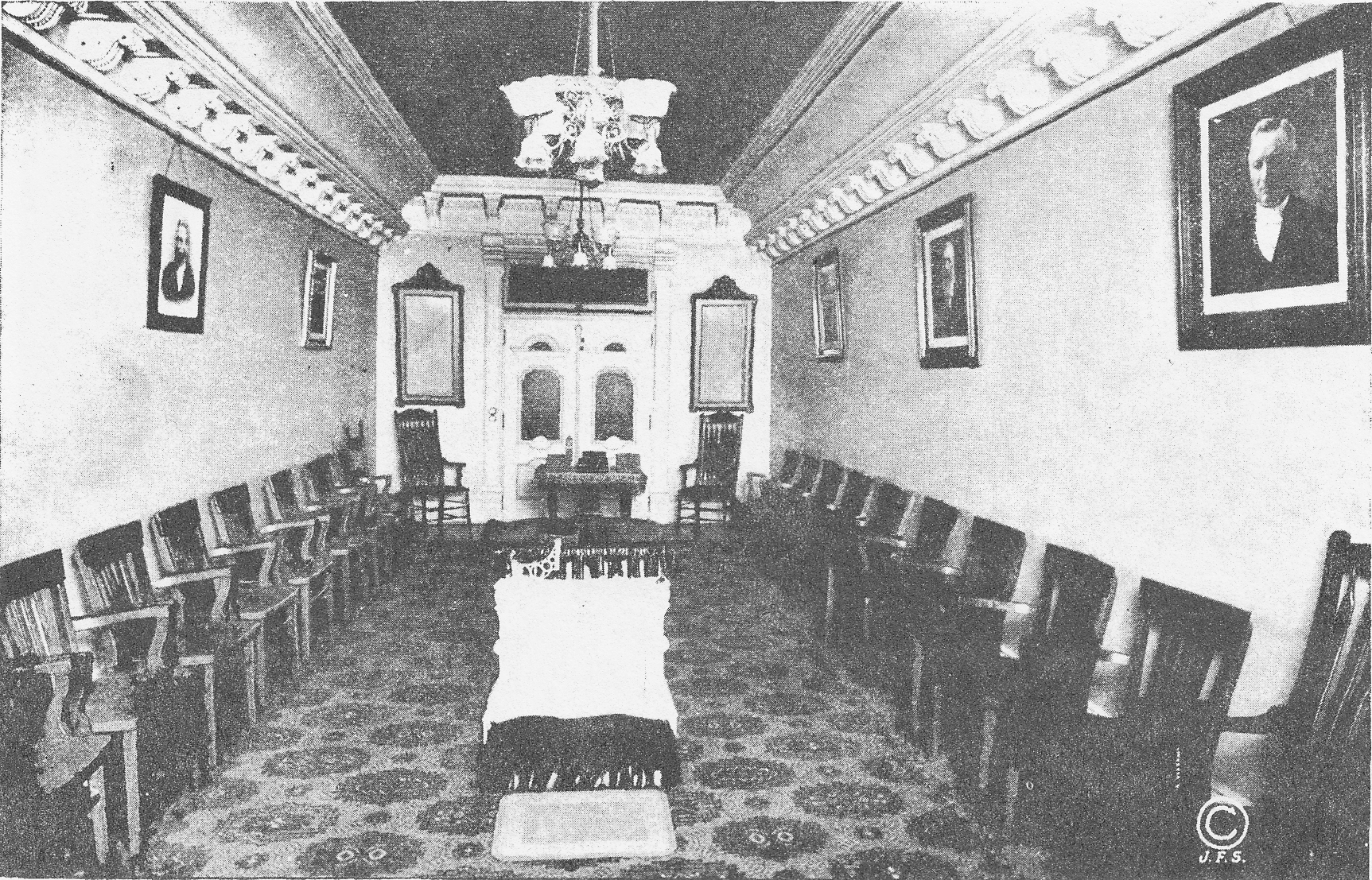
The Elders' Room, Salt Lake City Temple, 1911. Used for presiding Councils of nearby Elders Quorums for devotional services.

== Similarities in symbolism and ritual in the LDS Church ==
This image is an Illustration of LDS veil ceremony of the LDS temple endowment, featuring symbols, handshakes, and aprons similar to ones used in Freemasonry.

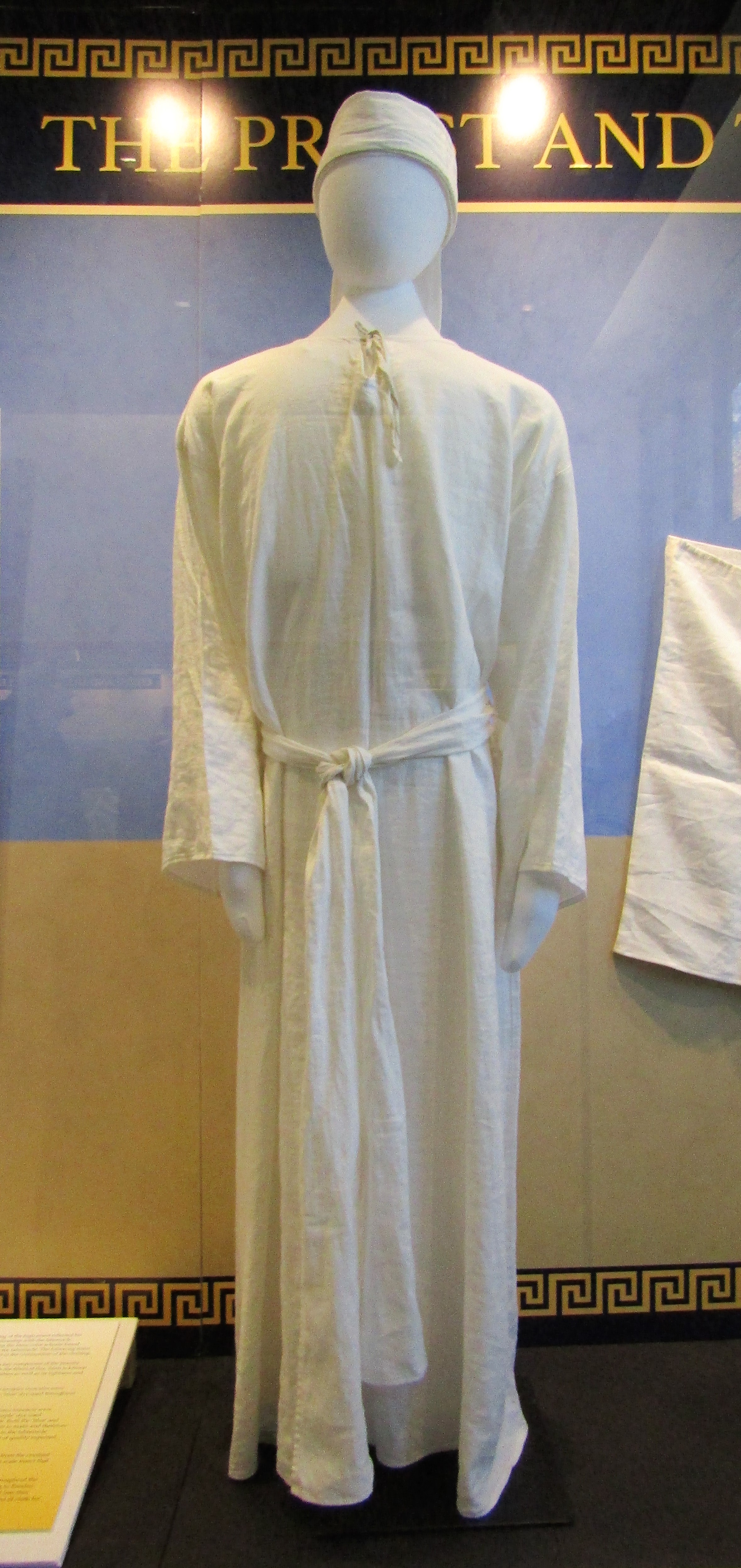
Representation of what Levitical Priests wore while serving in the Tabernacle and Temples of the Old Testament.

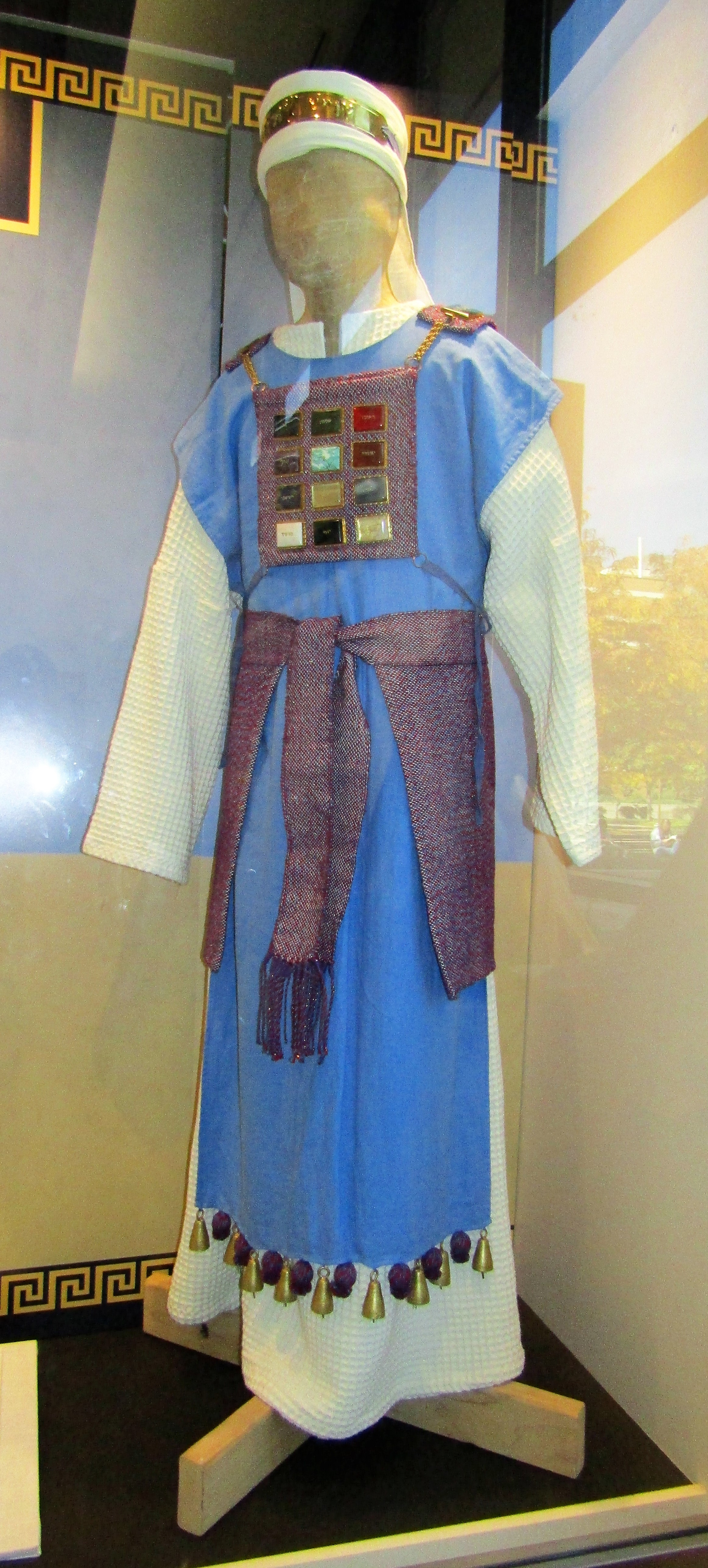
Representation of what Levitical High Priests wore while serving in the Tabernacle and Temples of the Old Testament.

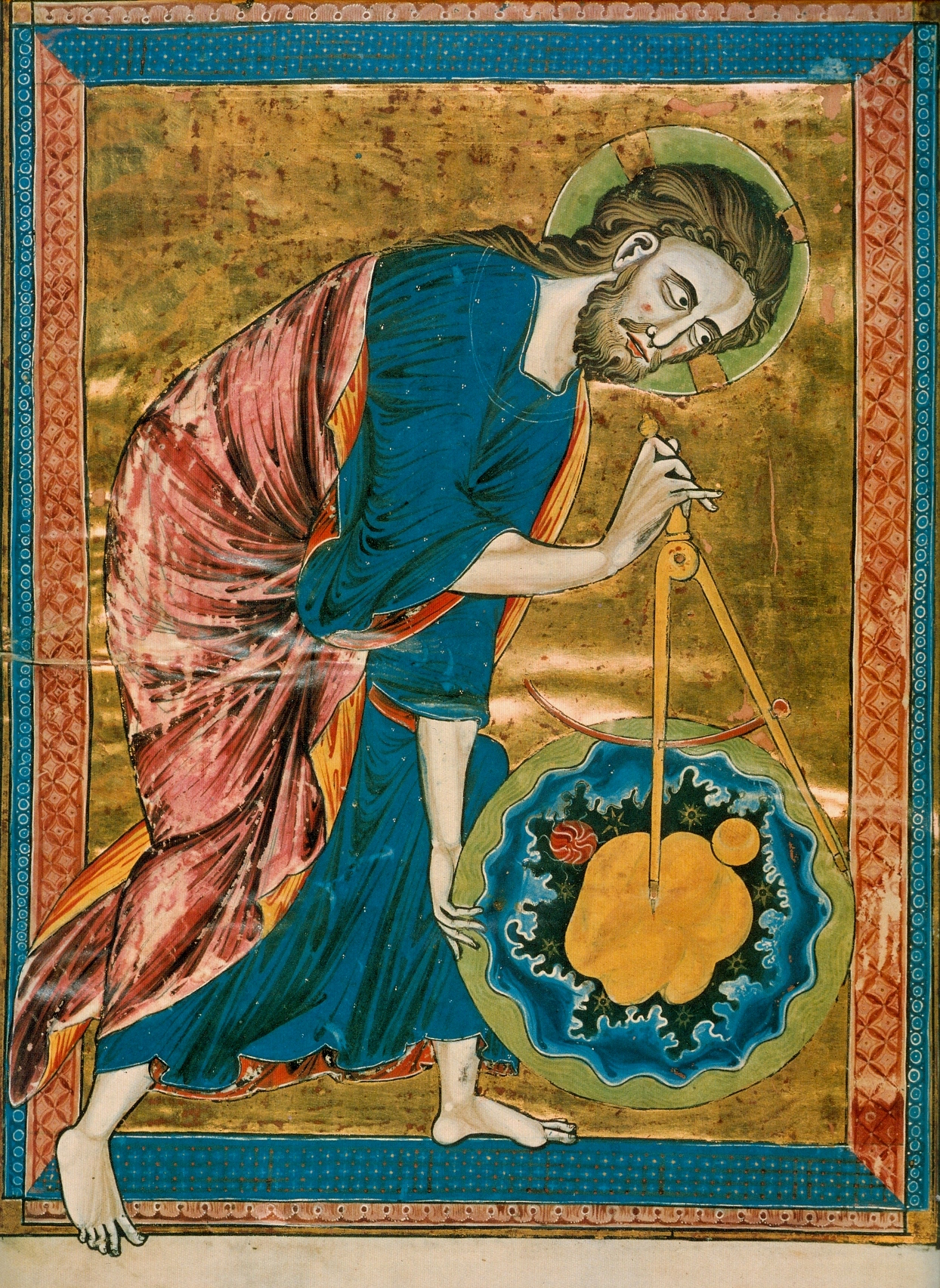
God the Geometer, a Christian painting depicting God with a set of compasses. Circa A.D. 1220-1230.

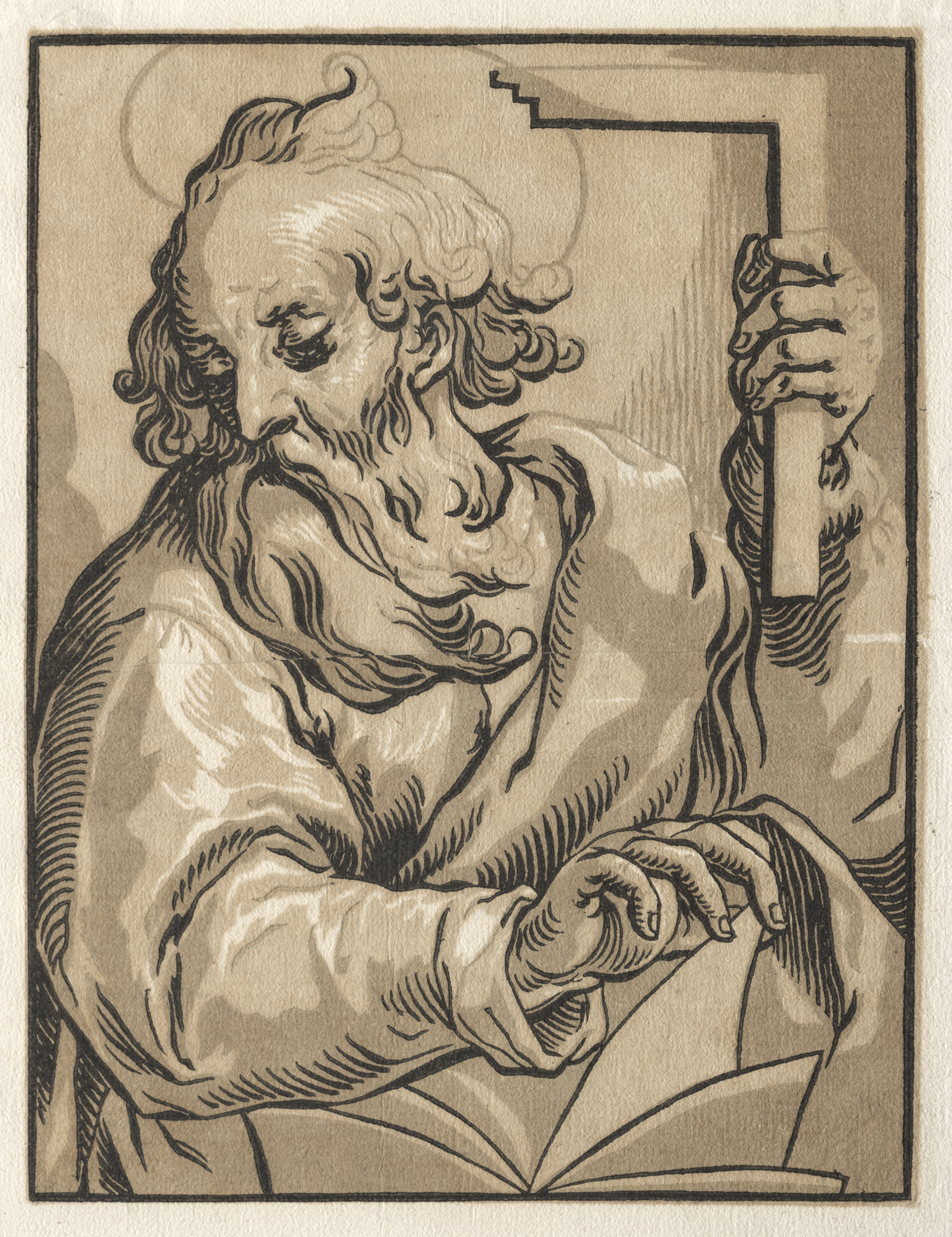
St. Thomas the Apostle is depicted holding a square. Circa A.D. 1600s.

LDS Church temple worship shares a number of symbols with Freemasonry, including concepts of aprons, tokens, ritualistic raising of the arms, etc. Many of these symbols have been adopted and adapted from Masonry to illustrate the principles taught in the movement. For example, whereas Masons exchange secret tokens to identify fellow Freemasons, the church has taught that these tokens must be given to sentinel angels so that disciples of Jesus Christ may be exalted to the highest glory of the kingdom of heaven:

Your endowment is, to receive all those ordinances in the House of the Lord, which are necessary for you, after you have departed this life, to enable you to walk back to the presence of the Father, passing the angels who stand as sentinels, being enabled to give them the key words, the signs and tokens, pertaining to the Holy Priesthood, and gain your eternal exaltation in spite of earth and hell.

The LDS Church's temple garments also bear the symbols adopted and adapted from Masonry: those of the Square and Compass; although the movement has imbued these symbols with religious meaning that wholly differs from the meaning of the symbols as used in Freemasonry. The Square and Compasses were a part of the first Angel Moroni statue, hanging above a horizontal Moroni (which doubled as a weather vane). Additionally, the symbols of the square and compasses exist in other ancient traditions far older than Masonry such as in Christian art and the Chinese legend Fuxi and Nüwa. According to historian Richard Lyman Bushman, "Portions of the temple ritual resembled Masonic rites that Joseph had observed when a Nauvoo lodge was organized in March 1842 and that he may have heard about from Hyrum, a Mason from New York days. The Nauvoo endowment was first bestowed just six weeks after Joseph's induction. The similarities were marked enough for Heber Kimball to quote Joseph saying that Freemasonry 'was taken from the priesthood but has become degen[e]rated. but many things are perfect.'"

Brigham Young is quoted as describing the origin of the temple rituals in a fashion that directly relates to the story of Hiram Abiff from Masonic folklore. Although Young changed some of the key Masonic aspects about Abiff to fit better with the view of LDS Church temples, the story is the same.

Although some critics claim that the Church adopted its ceremonial robes from Freemasonry, the only Masonic body that Joseph and subsequent leaders of the Church joined (Craft Masonry) does not utilize robes. Similarities are instead found between the Church's ceremonial robes and the priestly robes worn by the Levitical Priests and High Priests of the Old Testament. Clothing in Craft Masonic meetings are typically dark suits or tuxedos with white aprons.

== Historical position of the LDS Church ==
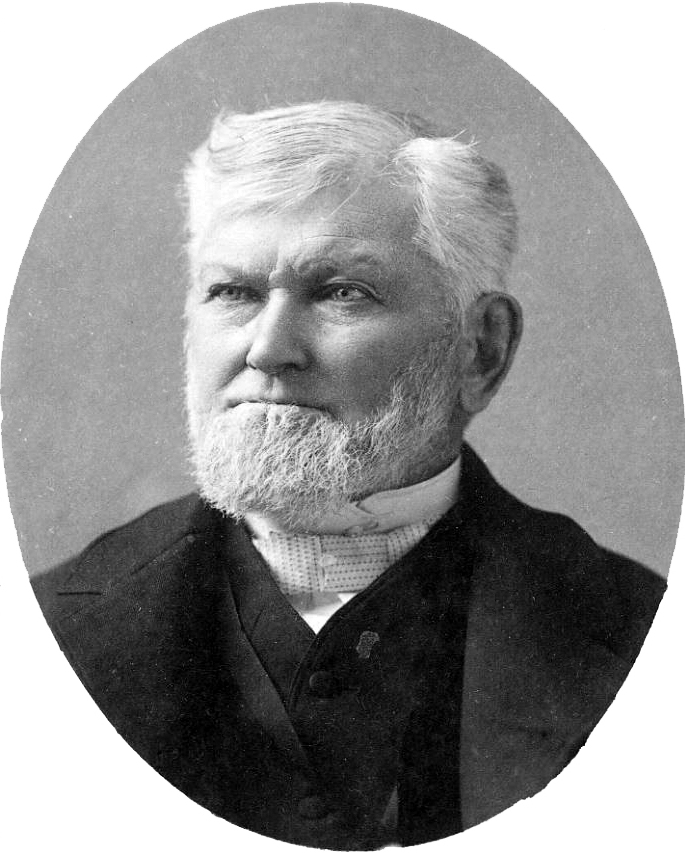
Wilford Woodruff, fourth president of the LDS Church; former member of Nauvoo Lodge, U. D.

After the Saints' failed attempts to obtain charters from England and Mexico, Brigham Young decided not to pursue the goal any further.

Eventually, trade unions that were ritualistic and oath-bound started to come into the Utah Territory that were perceived by the leadership of the church to be destabilizing the territorial economy. We see an example of this in a circular written by church president Wilford Woodruff and his two counselors, George Q. Cannon and Joseph F. Smith, in 1896 on whether members of the Ancient Order of United Workmen could hold temple recommends in the church.

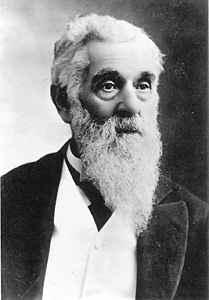
Lorenzo Snow, fifth President of the LDS Church; last known President to have been a member of Nauvoo Lodge, U. D.

A 1901 circular letter from church president Lorenzo Snow and his first counselor, Joseph F. Smith, to all stake presidencies discouraged—but did not prohibit—church members' desires to join "secret orders".

Snow's outlook on secret societies in general may have been formed from:

- the tense relationships between Nauvoo Lodge, U. D. (in which he was initiated after the Lodge had been suspended) and the Grand Lodge of Illinois.
- the tense relationships between the members of the Church in Utah and the Grand Lodge of Utah.
- the Rock Springs massacre (which had happened only about 15 years prior, in which members of a secret society called the Knights of Labor had killed scores of Chinese immigrants and drove the rest out of Wyoming).
- the 1896 circular from the First Presidency concerning the A. O. U. W. referenced above.

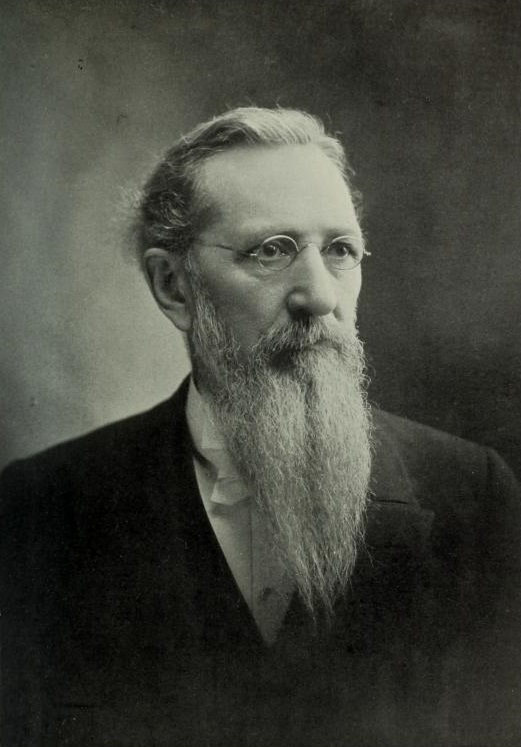
Joseph F. Smith, sixth President of the LDS Church

Later policies in the church against joining secret societies in general had been formed more due to such trade unions and insurance benefit organizations as stated above; President Joseph F. Smith later split these into two policies regarding such trade unions (specified as "Secret Organizations") and fraternal societies (specified as "Secret Societies").

These positions were combined and reiterated in Church's Handbook of Instructions in 1934 and in 1940. Further explanation for this policy was given in 1934 by Anthony W. Ivins of the First Presidency of the LDS Church.

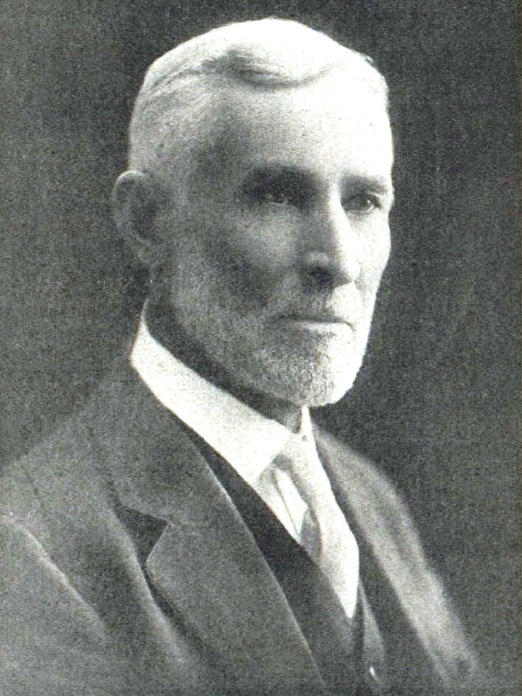
Anthony W. Ivins, First Counselor in the First Presidency of the LDS Church, 1925—1934.

Such remained the policy of the Church through 1985. However, resultant of the Grand Lodge of Utah lifting its formal ban against members of the Church, the Church removed mention of secret societies and secret organizations from its policies in its 1989 edition of its General Handbook as well as all subsequent editions. Since that time, the LDS Church's First Presidency has not made an official statement as to whether Freemasonry in particular is compatible with its membership. Don LeFevre, a past church spokesman said that the LDS Church—in outdated reference to above-given policies—"strongly advises its members not to affiliate with organizations that are secret, oath-bound, or would cause them to lose interest in church activities." A more tolerant statement is found in the book Encyclopedia of Mormonism, written by church members, stating, "The philosophy and major tenets of Freemasonry are not fundamentally incompatible with the teaching, theology, and doctrines of the Latter-day Saints. Both emphasize morality, sacrifice, consecration, and service, and both condemn selfishness, sin, and greed. Furthermore, the aim of Masonic ritual is to instruct—to make truth available so that man can follow it."

== Recent Position of the LDS Church ==
Since 1984, there have been many Masons in Utah who are Latter-day Saints and who serve and/or have served in various leadership positions, including Grand Masters, other Grand Officers, and Worshipful Masters; some of these have also served in and presided over various appendant, concordant, and/or affiliate side orders on a national and international basis. Outside of Utah, there have been many members of the LDS Church who have been Masons continuously since its early days.

In 2019, the LDS Church produced a YouTube video in its Now You Know series entitled "Joseph Smith and Masonry." The video states that "the policy [of whether it is acceptable for members of the Church to become Freemasons] is simple: members of the Church […] are not prohibited from becoming Freemasons. Nor are Masons prohibited from becoming members of the Church. Latter-day Saints believe that good can be found in many places."

== Position on Membership by Masonic Lodges ==
Today there is no formal obstacle in the Grand Lodge of Utah or in any other grand lodge preventing Latter-day Saints from becoming Freemasons. Exceptions have historically been those grand lodges that employ the Swedish Rite system, which requires a Christian Trinitarian belief of its members; these are located in the Nordic/Scandinavian countries. However, the Danish Order of Freemasons (whose Lodges use the Swedish Rite) is affiliated with two Grand Lodges that do not require its members to subscribe to Christian Trinitarian beliefs: The Ancient Fraternity of Free and Accepted Masons of Denmark and the Saint John's Lodge Association. In Sweden and Finland, one can choose between joining the Swedish Order of Freemasons (which uses the Swedish Rite) or the Grand Lodge of Finland (which does not use the Swedish Rite and which does not have the requirement of Christian Trinitarian belief to join). So, even in some of the countries where the Swedish Rite is employed, there still exist alternate options for Latter-day Saints to become Masons.

== 20th-century explorations of the issue ==
- In 1921, S. H. Goodwin (who served as thirty-eighth Grand Master of the Grand Lodge F&AM of Utah in 1912) wrote two articles in The Builder Magazine (a Masonic publication). In the February issue, he wrote "A Study of Mormonism and Its Connection with Masonry in the Early Forties"; in the March issue, he wrote "Mormonism and Freemasonry."
- In 1924, S. H. Goodwin (same author as above) wrote Mormonism and Masonry (published by the Grand Lodge of Utah), a work defending the formal ban against members of the Church that was implemented the next year.
- In 1924, S. H. Goodwin (same author as above) wrote another article in the November issue of The Builder Magazine entitled "Mormonism and Masonry - Anti-Masonry in the Book of Mormon."
- In 1934, S. H. Goodwin (same author as above) expanded his Mormonism and Masonry (also published by the Grand Lodge of Utah) to include more content.
- In 1934, Anthony W. Ivins (who served in the First Presidency of the LDS Church from 1921 until his death in 1934) wrote Relationship of Mormonism and Freemasonry, a response to S. H. Goodwin's above-mentioned works; it was published by Deseret News Press.
- In 1947, E. Cecil McGavin (who worked in the Church Historian's Office) wrote Mormonism and Masonry, a response to S. H. Goodwin's above-mentioned work; it was published by Bookcraft Publishers.
- In 1982, Arturo de Hoyos (now a prominent Freemason; nephew of Arturo de Hoyos) drafted a manuscript entitled "The Masonic Emblem and Parchments of Joseph & Hyrum Smith." It was the first work to correctly identify connect Hiram's mislabeled "Masonic parchments" with the practice of ritual magic. Reed C. Durham had previously identified Joseph's "Masonic" charm as a Jupiter talisman.
- In 1985, Kent Walgren contributed an article to Dialogue: A Journal of Mormon Thought entitled "Fast and Loose Freemasonry," which focuses on two particular, earlier works of Mervin B. Hogan (a Latter-day Saint and Freemason): The Involvement of Freemasonry with Mormonism on the American Midwestern Frontier and Mormonism and Freemasonry: The Illinois Episode.
- In 1989, Robin L. Carr (a Freemason but not a Mormon) wrote Freemasonry and Nauvoo, which was published by The Masonic Book Club and The Illinois Lodge of Research; this work explores the history of the "Mormon Lodges" that were established in Nauvoo during the early period of the Church.
- In 1989, Scott Abbott contributed an article to Dialogue: A Journal of Mormon Thought entitled "Mormonism, Magic and Masonry: The Damning Similarities", wherein he reviews William Schnoebelen's Mormonism's Temple of Doom.
- In 1994, Michael W. Homer (a Mormon) wrote "'Similarity of Priesthood in Masonry': The Relationship between Freemasonry and Mormonism" for Dialogue: A Journal of Mormon Thought.
- In 1995, Glen A. Cook (a Mormon who later served as the 137th Grand Master of the Grand Lodge F&AM of Utah in 2008) wrote an article called “A Review of Factors Leading to Tension Between the Church of Jesus Christ of Latter-Day Saints and Freemasonry,” which was published in Vol. XLVII, No. 4 of Philalethes: The Journal of Masonic Research & Letters, the official publication of the Philalethes Society, a Masonic research society.
- In 1999, Sir Knight Joseph E. Bennett, KYCH, 33°, FPS wrote a three-part series entitled "Buck and the Mormons", which includes some Masonic history in Nauvoo; it was published in the October, November, and December issues of Knight Templar, an official publication of the Grand Encampment of Knights Templar, USA.

== 21st-century explorations of the issue ==
- In 2001, David John Buerger contributed an article entitled "The Development of the Mormon Temple Endowment Ceremony" to Dialogue: A Journal of Mormon Thought, which delves into the history between the LDS Church and Freemasonry.
- In 2005, Sir Knight James A. Marples, 32°, wrote the article "A Tribute to Masonic Brother Hyrum Smith … A True Nauvoo Mason," which includes some history of Masonry in Nauvoo, in that year's September issue of Knight Templar, an official publication of the Grand Encampment of Knights Templar, USA.
- In 2006, Gilbert W. Scharffs wrote Mormons and Masons: Setting the Record Straight, which was published by Millennial Press.
- In 2010, Peter Paul Fuchs, 32°, wrote the article "Theological Conundrums from the 'Burned Over District' as the Key to Mormonism for Freemasonry" in Heredom, the academic journal of the Scottish Rite Research Society.
- In 2014, Brady G. Winslow submitted a thesis to the Graduate Faculty of Baylor University entitled "'It was By Reason of Being Mormons that We were Kept at Arms Length': Mormonism, Freemasonry, and Conflicting Interests on the Illinois Frontier."
- In 2014, the Joseph Smith Foundation produced the documentary Statesmen & Symbols: Prelude to the Restoration exploring Joseph Smith's involvement in Freemasonry. The DVD also details connections with Masonic symbols among the Chinese, Hopewell Indians, Early Christians, American Founding Fathers and the Egyptians.
- In 2014, Michael W. Homer published Joseph's Temples: The Dynamic Relationship Between Freemasonry and Mormonism, a condensation of the last 40 years of scholarship on the issue.
- In 2014, Gregory L. Smith contributed an article entitled "Cracking the Book of Mormon's 'Secret Combinations'?" to Interpreter: A Journal of Mormon Scripture, which deals with the notion of The Book of Mormon's phrase "secret combinations" being a reference to Freemasonry.
- In 2015, Jeffrey M. Bradshaw (a Latter-day Saint) contributed "Freemasonry and the Origins of Modern Temple Ordinances" to Interpreter: A Journal of Mormon Scripture.
- Since at least 2017, the Grand Lodge of British Columbia and Yukon AF&AM have had a section of their online library dedicated to the relationship between Freemasonry and the LDS Church.
- In 2019, the LDS Church published an essay entitled "Masonry" as a part of its Church History Topics series.
- In 2022, Method Infinite: Freemasonry and the Mormon Restoration, authored by Cheryl L. Bruno (a member of the LDS Church), Joe Steve Swick III (a member of the LDS Church and a Freemason), and Nicholas S. Literski (a Freemason and a former member of the LDS Church), was made available by Greg Kofford Books after at least thirteen years of anticipated release.
- In 2022, Freemasonry and the Origins of Latter-day Saint Temple Ordinances, authored by Jeffrey M. Bradshaw (a member of the LDS Church), was published by the Interpreter Foundation and Eborn Books.
- In 2022, John Lynch contributed an article entitled "Examining the Origins of Temple Worship" to Interpreter: A Journal of Latter-day Saint Faith and Scholarship, which is a review of Jeffrey Bradshaw's Freemasonry and the Origins of Latter-day Saint Temple Ordinances.
- In 2023, Jeffrey M. Bradshaw contributed an article entitled "An Important New Study of Freemasonry and the Latter-day Saints: What's Good, What's Questionable, and What's Missing in Method Infinite" to Interpreter: A Journal of Latter-day Saint Faith and Scholarship.
- In 2025, Michael H. Nielsen authored the article "A Historical Overview of the RLDS Church and Freemasonry" in the John Whitmer Historical Association Journal.
- In 2025, Colby Townsend contributed an article entitled "Secret Societies and the Political Context of Joseph Smith’s Rewritten Scripture" to Dialogue: A Journal of Mormon Thought, which delves into Masonry's history with the Church.
- In 2025, Michael Eddington contributed an article entitled "A Textual Comparison of Masonic Rites and the LDS Temple Endowment" to Interpreter: A Journal of Latter-day Saint Faith and Scholarship.

== See also ==
- Christian attitudes towards Freemasonry
- Walker Lewis
- Master Mahan
- Salt Lake Masonic Temple
