= Master Mahan =

Title applied to Cain and his descendant Lamech in the Book of Moses

Master Mahan, in the religious texts of the Latter Day Saint movement, is a title assumed first by Cain and later by his descendant Lamech. The title indicates that Cain and Lamech were each the "master" of a "great secret" in which they covenanted with Satan to kill for personal gain. The term is found in Joseph Smith's translation of the Bible in Genesis 5 (currently published by the Community of Christ) and in the Pearl of Great Price (in Chapter 5 of the Book of Moses), a religious text of the Church of Jesus Christ of Latter-day Saints (LDS Church).

Critics, who approach the issue from a secular perspective and argue that Smith's translation of the Bible was influenced by his cultural environment, including strong local anti-Masonry, generally suggest that the term is related to "Master Mason", the highest degree of the Blue Lodge of freemasonry. Another suggestion is that the term is related to "Mahoun", a pejorative reference to Muhammad during the Middle Ages that eventually became associated with witchcraft by Smith's era. Apologists, however, generally argue that references to "Master Mahan" were restored by Smith from missing parts of the Bible and that the term thus has Middle Eastern roots. Consequently, the LDS Church's publications suggest that the term "Mahan" could have derived from "mind", "destroyer", or "great one", and Hugh Nibley known as the "Father of Mormon Scholarly Apologetics" has speculated that the term is related to Arabic and Sanskrit words meaning "keeper of a great secret".

== Joseph Smith Translation of Bible ==
The reference to "Master Mahan" is found in a revision by Joseph Smith of Genesis 5 of the Bible, now published in the Inspired Version of the Bible (I.V.), Genesis 5, and in Chapter 5 the Pearl of Great Price (PGP), Book of Moses. The passage discussing the term begins after the ritual sacrifice by Cain and Abel, when God accepted Abel's sacrifice of a sheep but not Cain's sacrifice of crops. According to the passage, the angry Cain made a secret pact with Satan, who asked Cain:

Swear unto me by thy throat, and if thou tell it thou shalt die; and swear thy bretheren by their heads, and by the living God, that they tell it not; for if they tell it, they shall surely die; and this that thy father may not know it; and this day I will deliver thy brother Abel into thine hands.

After entering the secret pact with Satan, Cain said, "Truly I am Mahan, the master of this great secret, that I may murder to get gain." Then, the passage comments, "Wherefore Cain was called Master Mahan; and he gloried in his wickedness." The arrangement was referred to as a "secret combination".

Later, the passage states that Cain's descendant Lamech had "slain a man to [his] wounding, and a young man to [his] hurt", and Lamech "entered into a covenant with Satan, after the manner of Cain, wherein he became Master Mahan, master of the great secret which was administered unto Cain by Satan." When a man named Irad, one of the sons of Enoch who knew about Lamech's secret pact, revealed the secret to others, the passage states that Lamech killed him to enforce the blood oath of secrecy.

== Theories about etymology ==
A footnote to Moses 5:31 in the LDS Church edition of the Pearl of Great Price states, "'Mind,' 'destroyer,' and 'great one' are possible meanings of the roots evident in 'Mahan,'" but no further explanation is provided. In referring to the footnote, Matthew B. Brown, a Mormon apologist, has stated that he believes that "Mahan" means "destroyer" because "the Hebrew word maha means 'destroy,' and the addition of an n would make the word a noun. Hence, maha(n) = destroy(er)."

Some commentators have suggested that "Master Mahan" is derived or related to "Master Mason", the highest degree of the Blue Lodge of Freemasonry. Brown stated, "Anti-Mormon critics have long claimed that Master Mahan is a thinly veiled variation of Master Mason" and claims "They believe that the presence of this title in LDS scripture clearly demonstrates that Joseph Smith plagiarized Masonic material for his creative ventures."

D. Michael Quinn has suggested that Brown's interpretations "ignore textual and linguistic context" of the passage and, as an alternative, he favors the interpretation of the phrase's derivation from "Mahoun."

== See also ==
- Mormonism and Freemasonry
- Deal with the Devil

== Sources ==
- Arbaugh, George Bartholomew (1932), Revelation in Mormonism: Its Character and Changing Forms, Chicago: University of Chicago Press, OCLC 3489776.
- Brown, Matthew B. (1997), "Girded about with a Lambskin", Journal of Book of Mormon Studies, vol. 6, no. 2, Provo, Utah: Maxwell Institute, pp. 124–151, archived from the original on August 17, 2003.
- Godfrey, Kenneth W. (1992). "Freemasonry in Nauvoo". In Ludlow, Daniel H (ed.). Encyclopedia of Mormonism. New York: Macmillan Publishing. pp. 527–528. ISBN 0-02-879602-0. OCLC 24502140..
- Homer, Michael W. (1994), "Similarity of Priesthood in Masonry: The Relationship between Freemasonry and Mormonism.", Dialogue: A Journal of Mormon Thought, 27 (3): 1–113, doi:10.2307/45225960, JSTOR 45225960, S2CID 254317678.
- Quinn, D. Michael (1998), Early Mormonism and the Magic World View (2nd ed.), Salt Lake City: Signature Books, ISBN 1-56085-089-2.
- Tanner, Jerald; Tanner, Sandra (1969), The Mormon Kingdom, Salt Lake City: Utah Lighthouse Ministry.
- Whalen, William J. (1964), The Latter-day Saints in the Modern World: An Account of Contemporary Mormonism, New York: John Day, OCLC 390576.
