= East Layton, Utah =

East Layton
- Former city
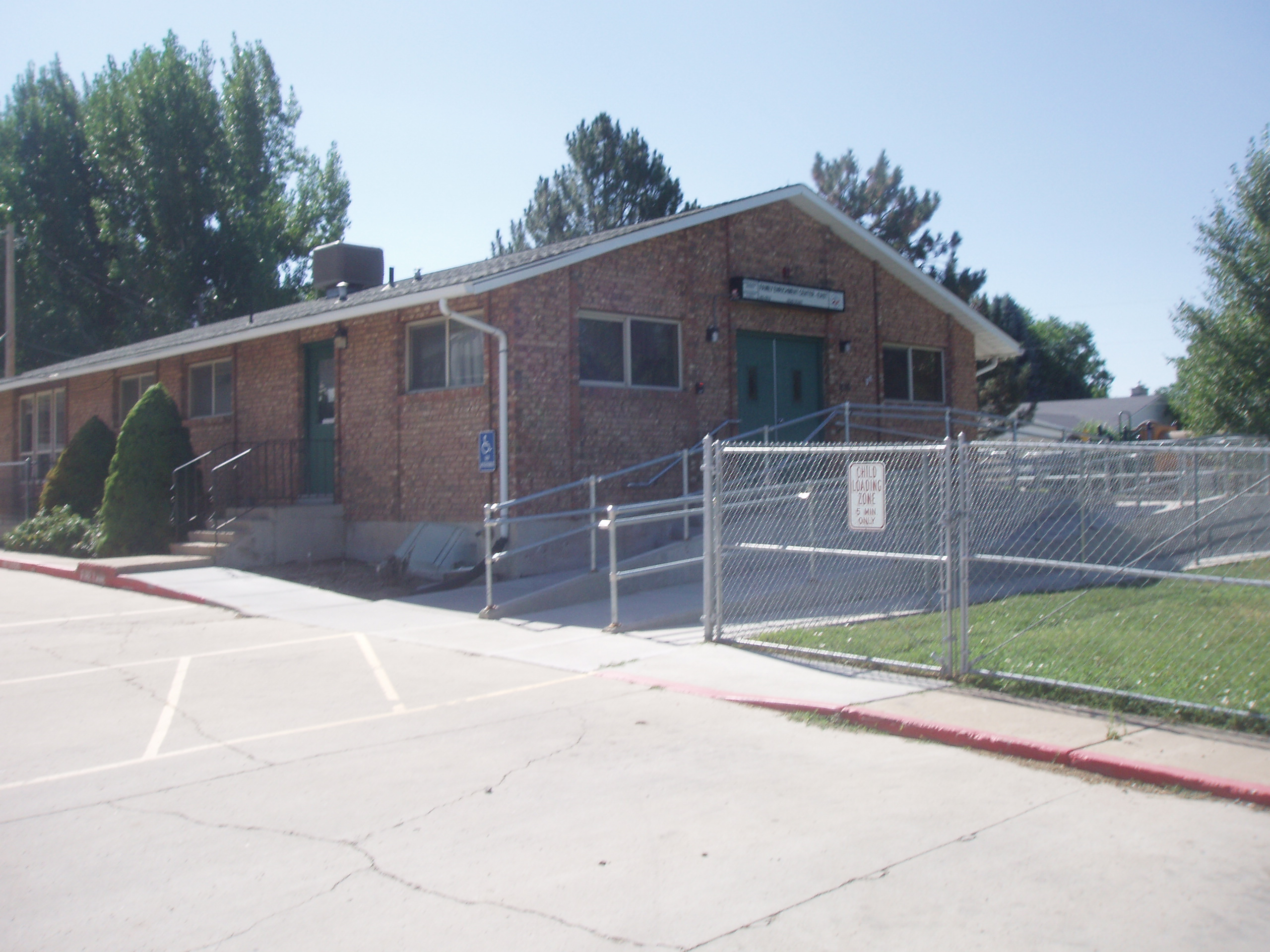
- Former city offices

- Location of East Layton in Utah East Layton (the United States)
- Coordinates: 41°04′52″N 111°55′12″W
- Country: United States
- State: Utah
- County: Davis
- Incorporated: April 2, 1936
- Became a city: January 1972
- Merged with Layton: January 13, 1981
- Founder: David Green
- Named for: Christopher Layton

Area
  - Total: 2 sq mi (5.2 km^{2})
- Elevation: 4,754 ft (1,449 m)
- Time zone: UTC-7 (Mountain (MST))
  - Summer (DST): UTC-6 (MDT)
- ZIP code: 84040
- Area code: 801
- GNIS feature ID: 1440835

East Layton is a former city in Davis County, Utah, United States. Adjacent to Layton, it was incorporated in 1936 in order to secure funding for a community water system. East Layton remained a small, steadily growing residential town for decades, becoming a city in 1972. Rapid expansion during the 1970s led to a merger in 1981 with Layton, now Davis County's most populous city and one of the largest in Utah.

== Geography ==
East Layton stretched between Fairfield Road on the west and the foothills of the Wasatch Mountains on the east, containing the full length of Cherry Lane, the city's major street. The boundaries were irregular, but reached as far north as Antelope Drive (2000 North) and as far south as Gentile Street (the north-south origin of Layton's grid plan, now Utah State Route 109). East Layton Elementary School and Adams Reservoir are landmarks lying inside the former city limits, which encompassed a total area just under 2 square miles (5.2 km^{2}). City offices were located at 1010 N Emerald Drive (coordinates 41°04′28″N 111°56′07″W), at the southwest corner of Andy Adams Park. The building is now home to a daycare center.

== History ==
The East Layton area was settled together with Layton, as an outgrowth of Kaysville beginning in the 1850s. At Layton's incorporation in 1920, East Layton remained separate, a rural unincorporated area with only a few residents.

=== Founding ===
The local water supply was unreliable, a common problem in Utah's desert climate. Wells and streams often ran dry in late summer, and water would have to be hauled to homes by hand. Lifelong resident David Green envisioned a municipal water system supplied from Crooked Canyon in the Wasatch Mountains to the east. By the 1930s many of Green's neighbors were interested, but Utah's banks were lending very little money due to the Great Depression. Financing for public works was available through the federal Works Progress Administration (WPA), but only to incorporated municipalities. In January 1936, 53 East Layton residents signed a petition to form a town in order to fund the water system. On April 2, 1936, the town of East Layton was incorporated, with David Green as town board president.

In 1937, East Layton voters unanimously supported a bond measure, and the WPA approved the town's loan application. The money, however, was slow to arrive. Members of the town board contacted Henry H. Blood, a native of Kaysville and then governor of Utah, and asked for help. Blood was able to use his influence to expedite the process, and East Layton's water project proceeded. David Green was the supervisor, directing a rotating team of laborers whose wages were paid by the WPA. They laid collection pipes from the mouth of Crooked Canyon down to a reservoir on Valley View Drive at the eastern edge of town. A wooden trestle bridged a gorge along the way. Rough terrain made digging difficult, and progress was slow. Costs mounted, and the original money ran out. The state of Utah provided additional support, matching funds for contributions by East Layton families. By the time of completion the WPA had covered about 60% of the expense.

=== Growth and merger ===
Historical population
Census	Pop.	Note	%±
1940	124		—
1950	217		75.0%
1960	444		104.6%
1970	763		71.8%
1980	3,531		362.8%

East Layton began as a sparsely populated rural community, and after incorporation its population initially declined, dropping from 160 in 1936 to 124 in 1940. From 1940 to 1950, while Layton's population increased fivefold, East Layton's less than doubled. Such growth characterized most of the town's history. The town completed an expanded reservoir in 1963, and a sewer system and enlarged water system in 1969. A special 1971 census counted 859 residents, making East Layton eligible to become a third-class city in January 1972.

Despite continual residential growth, East Layton never had a commercial tax base to speak of; there were almost no businesses in town. Residents shopped in Layton or other nearby cities. Land developments in the 1970s brought explosive growth, as the city became an important residential community for nearby Hill Air Force Base. Tasked with providing municipal services for a city suddenly quadrupled in size, leaders opted with voter approval to become part of the larger and more diverse Layton City. The two merged on January 13, 1981. Development in the East Layton area has continued apace in the decades since; it is still a largely residential area, affluent and densely populated.
