= Eborn Books =

American bookstore

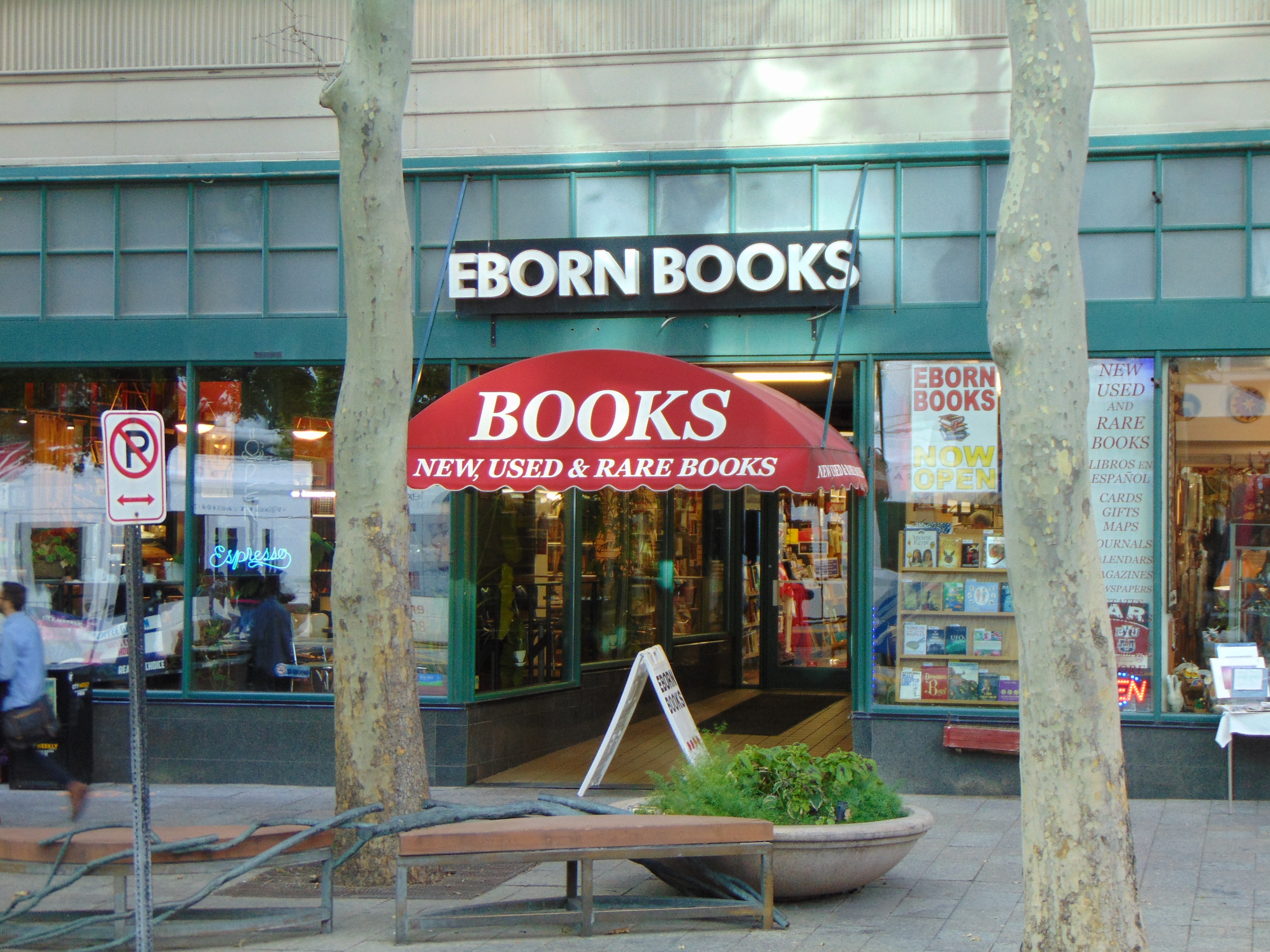
- Eborn Books Warehouse in Tooele, Utah.
- Company type: Limited liability company
- Industry: Book sales and publishing
- Genre: all genres
- Founded: 1989 in Layton, Utah
- Founder: Bret Eborn
- Headquarters: 254 South Main Street; Salt Lake City, Utah 84101; United States
- Number of locations: 5 (2019)
- Area served: Wasatch Front, but has worldwide sales via the Internet
- Products: New & used books
- Website: ebornbooks.com

Eborn Books is a bookstore (selling new, used, and rare books) and book publisher located on the Wasatch Front with its main store in Salt Lake City, Utah, United States.

== Description ==
The company specializes primarily in the Latter-day Saint book market and sells a majority of its more than half-million books on a consignment plan. It also publishes non-fiction works within the Mormon literature genre. (The publishing division also has an association with Shady Hill Press, which specializes in fictional works within the same genre [including fantasy and science fiction].) The enterprise is named after its founder-owner Bret Eborn.

Eborn Books' main store was located in the David Keith Building at 254 South Main Street in Downtown Salt Lake City (across from the Gallivan Center and in front of the Gallivan Plaza TRAX station). Four additional shops are located in the Newgate Mall in Ogden, the Layton Hills Mall in Layton, and the Provo Towne Centre in Provo, with an additional store (called the Nauvoo Trading Post) in Nauvoo, Illinois. (Note: Although Eborn Books had expanded to six locations along the Wasatch Front by March 2012, as of late July 2019, there were only five store locations remaining: Downtown Salt Lake City, Newgate Mall, Layton Hills Mall, and Provo Towne Centre, with another store in Nauvoo, Illinois. Previous locations included the South Towne Center in Sandy, the Valley Fair Mall in West Valley City, and Roy. There were also plans for one in South Jordan.) In addition to its "brick and mortar" locations, the bookstore has substantial sales via the Internet and ships books worldwide.

== History ==
The business originally started when Bret Eborn (having been a book collector for many years) began buying and selling used books. He was sufficiently successful at this endeavor that he and his wife Cindy opened their first bookstore in Layton in 1989, later moving it to a second location in Layton. Eborn says the business increased substantially once it began selling books on consignment. Eborn then spent ten years in Phoenix, Arizona, publishing books and selling used and rare books through mail-order catalogs. In 2000 they moved back to Utah and opened a location in Roy.

By April 2002, Eborn Books opened a shop in Downtown Salt Lake City at 433 East 300 South, adding to its previous location in Roy. Within several months, Bret Eborn indicated that he planned to close the Roy location and open another one in the Valley Fair Mall in West Valley City. In 2016 another franchised store opened in Layton, Utah at the Layton Hills Mall, and in 2017 a franchise opened in South Town Center in Sandy, Utah. Also in 2017 Eborn Books purchased the Latter-Day Harvest Bookstore, from Living Scriptures, in Nauvoo, Illinois (which was called the Nauvoo Trading Post, but they soon renamed it as an Eborn Books location).

In April 2008, Bret Eborn purchased two old editions of the Book of Mormon for $11,000 at his store in the Valley Fair Mall in West Valley City. Later the same evening he discovered that the books had been stolen from the Daughters of Utah Pioneers Museum several days before, along with 11 other rare books. Upon verifying the proper ownership of the books much later that night, Eborn contacted the Salt Lake City Police Department (SLCPD) and turned over the artifacts. Eborn believed the estimated value of the two books to be $22,000, so he paid $11,000 for them. Regarding the estimated value of the entire lot that was stolen, the police erroneously reported them to be worth "anywhere from $800,000 to a million dollars," but book dealers would argue it to be much less, as the books were of extremely poor quality. Fortunately for Eborn, the thieves were caught before his check was cashed.

In March 2012 Eborn Books moved into its largest ever location on South Main Street in Downtown Salt Lake City. The locale had been previously occupied (since 1964) by Sam Weller's Bookstore, until that store moved to Trolley Square earlier in the same year. (Note: Sam Weller's Books (having been in the new and used book retail business in Downtown Salt Lake City since 1929) changed its name to Weller's Book Works following its move to the Trolley Square. In previous decades it been known as Zion Bookstore and then Sam Weller's Zion Bookstore.) The inventory of books that Sam Weller's was unable to sell prior to moving were purchased by Eborn Books.

Eborn Books also publishes Mormon-related books, under the names Eborn Books or Eborn Publishing. They also distribute books for Shady Hill Press and Rush Utah. Recently they have published books for The Interpreter Foundation. Bret Eborn, the owner, is the author of The Comprehensive Guide to Mormon Books (1997) and Bret Eborn's Guide to Mormon Books (2002, 2007, and 2008 editions). More recently he authored the book Flaxen Cords: A Connection between Secret Combinations and Ancient Khipu Knotted Devices.

In 2013, Eborn Books was named as "Best Reborn Book Nook" in Salt Lake City Weekly newspaper's "Best of Utah 2013: Main Street" nomination.

In May 2019, Eborn Books announced that the owner of the building of the Salt Lake City store had ordered that they (and several other businesses in the building) vacate the building by the end of the year. Eborn Books planned on closing the store June 29th, to allow for the remaining inventory to be moved to a warehouse during the presumably better summer weather, rather than in the late fall. The official closing day was the last Saturday of June. However, there were still so many books remaining in the location that they remained open on Saturdays until the rest of the inventory was moved to a Tooele warehouse There was a huge sale at the store and there were long lines at both cash registers for several weekends. www.ebornbooks.com has since then sold tens of thousands of books and shipped them all over the world.
