= Layton station =

Layton station may refer to:

- Layton railway station (England), in Layton, Lancashire, England
- Layton station (FrontRunner), in Layton, Utah, United States

== See also ==
- Leyton tube station, Greater London
- Leyton Midland Road railway station, Greater London
