= Matthew B. Brown =

- Born: August 29, 1964; Portland, Oregon
- Died: October 5, 2011; Utah
- Education: BYU
- Occupations: author, historian
- Spouse: Jamie Brown
- Writing career
- Genres: LDS history, Temple theology

Matthew B. Brown (August 29, 1964 – October 5, 2011) was a Latter-day Saint (Mormon) author and historian whose emphasis was on the history and doctrine of Joseph Smith and his successors through Brigham Young.

== Biographical background ==
Brown was born in Portland, Oregon on August 29, 1964, and lived in Alabama, Kansas, Minnesota, Wisconsin, Florida, and Utah. He served as a full-time missionary for the Church of Jesus Christ of Latter-day Saints (LDS Church) in Spokane, Washington. After working in the field of elevator construction, maintenance, and repair he earned a B.A. in History from Brigham Young University and began to work as a book writer and manuscript evaluator.

Brown died October 5, 2011, after suffering heart failure on September 23 while he was in the BYU library, and falling into a subsequent coma. He was survived by his wife, Jamie.

== Publishing, lectures, and research ==
Brown authored several non-fiction books, as well as a few research-based articles for the Journal of Book of Mormon Studies and the FARMS Review—both of which are publications of the Foundation for Ancient Research and Mormon Studies (FARMS) within the Neal A. Maxwell Institute of Religious Scholarship at Brigham Young University in Provo, Utah. He acted as the compiler and editor of the journal for the Foundation for Apologetic Information and Research from January to September 2010 and began acting in the same capacities for the EXPOUND newsletter beginning in January 2011 (expoundlds.com).

Brown gave lectures for the Joseph Smith Jr. Family Organization, the BYU Mormon Media symposium, the BYU Studies 50th anniversary conference, the Students of the Ancient Near East association at BYU, the religion faculty at the University of Utah's LDS Institute, the Foundation for Ancient Research and Mormon Studies, the Foundation for Apologetic Information & Research, and the annual EXPOUND symposium (expoundlds.com).

Brown's research interests included early Mormon history, doctrinal issues of the LDS Church, architectural and iconic symbolism and also the initiation rituals of the ancient Hebrews, the Early Christians, Medieval monks, and Medieval kings.

== Published works ==
Books

- Symbols in Stone: Symbolism on the Early Temples of the Restoration (1997 - Covenant Communications)
- The Gate of Heaven: Insights on the Doctrines and Symbols of the Temple (1999 - Covenant Communications)
- All Things Restored: Evidences and Witnesses of the Restoration (2000 - Covenant Communications)
- The Plan of Salvation: Doctrinal Notes and Commentary (2002 - Covenant Communications)
- Plates of Gold: The Book of Mormon Comes Forth (2003 - Covenant Communications)
- Joseph Smith: The Man, The Mission, The Message (2004 - Covenant Communications)
- Receiving Gifts of the Spirit (2005 - Covenant Communications)
- Prophecies: Signs of the Times, Second Coming, Millennium (2006 - Covenant Communications)
- A Pillar of Light: The History and Message of the First Vision (2009 - Covenant Communications)
- Exploring the Connection Between Mormons and Masons (2009 - Covenant Communications)

Book notices

- Pillar of Light, FARMS Review
- Joseph Smith, BYU Magazine
- Plates of Gold, BYU Magazine (also mentions Symbols, Gate, and Plan)
- All Things Restored, BYU Magazine

DVD

- Exploring the Connection Between Mormons and Masons - provided images, conducted interviews, credited as a producer (2009 - Covenant Communications / Mirror Films)

Papers and articles

- Brown, Matthew B. (1997). "Girded about with a Lambskin". Journal of Book of Mormon Studies. 6 (2). Foundation for Ancient Research and Mormon Studies: 124–151. doi:10.2307/44758824. JSTOR 44758824. S2CID 193554558. Archived from the original on 2003-08-17.
- Brown, Matthew B. (1998). "Of Your Own Selves Shall Men Arise". FARMS Review of Books. 10 (1). Provo, Utah: Foundation for Ancient Research and Mormon Studies: 97–131. doi:10.2307/44794026. JSTOR 44794026. S2CID 76548950.
- Brown, Matthew B. (2004), "Historical or Hysterical? Anti-Mormons and Documentary Sources", FAIR Conference, Foundation for Apologetic Information & Research, archived from the original on 2007-06-11
- Brown, Matthew B. (2006), "Revised or Unaltered? Joseph Smith's Foundational Stories", FAIR Conference, Foundation for Apologetic Information & Research
- Brown, Matthew B. (2008), "The Israelite Temple and the Early Christians", FAIR Conference, Foundation for Apologetic Information & Research
- Brown, Matthew B. (2009), "Ancient Temple Patterns in D&C 124", new book appendix (Symbols in Stone), Covenant Communications
- Brown, Matthew B. (2009), "Brigham Young's Teachings on Adam" (PDF), FAIR Conference, Foundation for Apologetic Information & Research
- Brown, Matthew B. (2010), "Luke 13:23-30 and the Israelite Temple", BYU Studies symposium paper, BYU Studies, archived from the original on 2010-09-27
- Brown, Matthew B. (2011), "Cube, Gate, and Measuring Tools: A Biblical Pattern", Expound Symposium paper, Expound, archived from the original on 2011-05-18

Interviews

- "Mormons, Masons and Myths," Deseret News (19 May 2010)
- "New book examines common ground between Mormons and Masons ," Provo, Utah Daily Herald, (31 October 2009)
- "People of Faith with Carole Mikita for Sunday, October 25, 2009", KSL Newsradio, Salt Lake City, Utah (Sunday, 25 October 2009)
