= Ruby Timms Price =

American educator (1915–2018)

- Born: December 13, 1915; Kilgore, Texas
- Died: March 17, 2018 (aged 102)
- Education: Brigham Young University
- Occupations: Educator and activist

Ruby Timms Price (December 13, 1915 – March 17, 2018) was an American educator and activist. She is considered to be the first Black teacher in the state of Utah, in the United States.

== Biography ==
Born in Kilgore, Texas to parents Levy and Polly Douglas Timms, Ruby Timms moved to Layton, Utah at a young age. She married Ralph Price Sr. on November 29, 1948 in Evanston, Wyoming. Price received her master's degree from Brigham Young University.

Price began teaching at the Intermountain Indian School in Brigham City, Utah in 1950. Afterwards, she was hired by the Davis County School District in the 1960s. She taught for 44 years. In 1977, Price was named Utah Mother of the Year - the first black woman to receive the award.

Price served as the first president of the Utah chapter of the National Association for the Advancement of Colored People (NAACP).

Although she served as a chairperson of the Davis County Republican Party for four terms, she campaigned for Barack Obama in 2008.

== Legacy ==
In 2011, the Davis School District created four scholarships and named them after her. They are to be awarded to college-bound minority students who want to be teachers.
