= Layton, Utah =

City in Utah, United States

- City
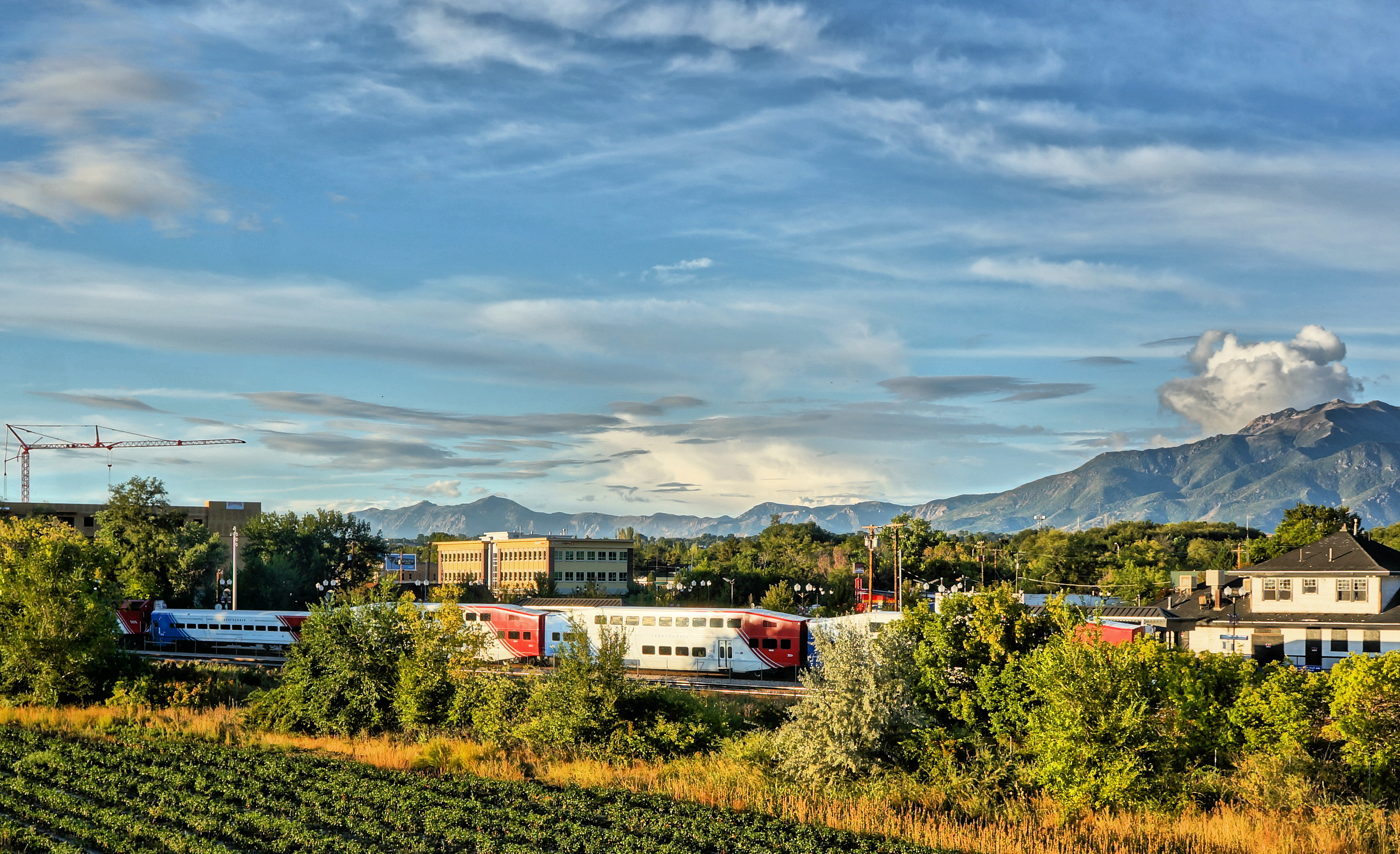
- Historic Downtown Layton

- Flag

- Location within Davis County and the State of Utah
- Coordinates: 41°04′18″N 111°59′49″W
- Country: United States
- State: Utah
- County: Davis
- Settled: 1850s
- Incorporated: May 24, 1920
- City: 1950
- Named for: Christopher Layton

Government
  - Type: Council–manager

Area
  - Total: 22.65 sq mi (58.67 km^{2})
  - Land: 22.50 sq mi (58.27 km^{2})
  - Water: 0.15 sq mi (0.40 km^{2})
- Elevation: 4,459 ft (1,359 m)

Population (2020)
  - Total: 81,773
  - Estimate (2024): 87,392
  - Density: 3,634.7/sq mi (1,403.35/km^{2})
- Time zone: UTC−7 (Mountain (MST))
  - Summer (DST): UTC−6 (MDT)
- ZIP codes: 84040, 84041
- Area codes: 385, 801
- FIPS code: 49-43660
- GNIS feature ID: 2411639
- Website: www.laytoncityutah.gov

Layton (/ˈleɪʔɪn/) is a city in Davis County, Utah, United States. It is part of the Ogden-Clearfield Metropolitan Statistical Area. As of the 2020 census, the city had a population of 81,773, with 2022 Census Bureau estimates showing an increase to 82,601. 2024 estimates place Layton's population at 87,392. Layton is the most populous city in Davis County and the ninth most populous in Utah.

Layton has direct access to Salt Lake City, Ogden, Salt Lake City International Airport, Antelope Island, and the FrontRunner commuter rail. Layton City is a leader in economic development for the region, with immediate adjacency to Hill Air Force Base, a large hospitality district (1,000+ hotel beds) and conference center, the Layton Hills Mall, multiple nationally recognized retail and food chains, the East Gate Business Park, and the Weber State University-Davis campus.

In 2014, Layton contributed $1.34 billion worth of retail sales activity, the second largest market north of Salt Lake City and seventh largest in Utah.

== History ==
=== Founding ===
Layton was settled in the 1850s as an outgrowth of Kaysville and is named after Christopher Layton, a Latter-day Saint settler and leader. It was included in the boundaries when Kaysville was incorporated as a city in 1868, but by the 1880s, many Layton residents wanted to separate from the city. They challenged Kaysville's authority to tax their property, claiming they received no municipal services. This dispute reached the United States Supreme Court in 1894 as the case of Linford v. Ellison, which was decided in favor of the Layton property owners. The separatist movement finally succeeded in 1902, when Layton became an independent unincorporated area. After further growth, it was made an incorporated town in 1920.

=== Expansion ===
The town's population increased slowly; up until 1940, it was about 600. The creation of Hill Air Force Base to the north in 1940, followed shortly by the United States' entry into World War II, led to a dramatic population increase. War workers streamed into the area; the 1950 census counted 3,456 people. Layton became a city, transformed from a farming town to a residential community. Growth slowed after the war, but Layton continued to develop as a suburban bedroom community, as those not employed at the Air Force base began commuting to the Salt Lake City or Ogden areas. The city continued to expand geographically, annexing surrounding parcels of land, including the adjacent town of Laytona and the city of East Layton. In 1985, Layton passed Bountiful to become the most populous city in Davis County.

== Geography ==
Layton is located in the northern portion of the Wasatch Front, approximately 25 miles (40 km) north of Salt Lake City and 15 miles (24 km) south of Ogden. It is bordered by Clearfield to the northwest, Hill Air Force Base to the north, South Weber to the northeast, the Wasatch Mountains to the east, Kaysville to the south, Great Salt Lake wetlands to the southwest and Syracuse to the west.

According to the United States Census Bureau, Layton has a total area of 22.2 square miles (57.4 km^{2}), of which 22.0 square miles (57.0 km^{2}) is land and 0.15 square miles (0.4 km^{2}), or 0.78%, is water.

=== Climate ===
The climate in this area is characterized by hot summers and cold winters. Great Salt Lake effect snow is common in the winter.

== Demographics ==
Historical population
Census	Pop.	Note	%±
1930	597		—
1940	646		8.2%
1950	3,456		435.0%
1960	9,027		161.2%
1970	13,603		50.7%
1980	22,862		68.1%
1990	41,784		82.8%
2000	58,474		39.9%
2010	67,311		15.1%
2020	81,773		21.5%
2022 (est.)	82,601		1.0%
U.S. Decennial Census

=== Racial and ethnic composition ===
Layton, Utah – Racial and ethnic composition Note: the US Census treats Hispanic/Latino as an ethnic category. This table excludes Latinos from the racial categories and assigns them to a separate category. Hispanics/Latinos may be of any race.
Race / Ethnicity (NH = Non-Hispanic)	Pop 2000	Pop 2010	Pop 2020	% 2000	% 2010	% 2020
White alone (NH)	50,820	55,215	62,699	86.91%	82.03%	76.67%
Black or African American alone (NH)	907	1,067	1,126	1.55%	1.59%	1.38%
Native American or Alaska Native alone (NH)	255	251	421	0.44%	0.37%	0.51%
Asian alone (NH)	1,178	1,353	1,796	2.01%	2.01%	2.20%
Pacific Islander alone (NH)	141	342	526	0.24%	0.51%	0.64%
Other race alone (NH)	61	99	345	0.10%	0.15%	0.42%
Mixed race or Multiracial (NH)	1,044	1,473	3,533	1.79%	2.19%	4.32%
Hispanic or Latino (any race)	4,068	7,511	11,327	6.96%	11.16%	13.85%
Total	58,474	67,311	81,773	100.00%	100.00%	100.00%

=== 2020 census ===
As of the 2020 census, Layton had a population of 81,773. The median age was 31.3 years, 31.0% of residents were under the age of 18, and 10.4% of residents were 65 years of age or older. For every 100 females there were 101.7 males, and for every 100 females age 18 and over there were 99.0 males age 18 and over.

99.8% of residents lived in urban areas, while 0.2% lived in rural areas.

There were 26,128 households in Layton, of which 42.7% had children under the age of 18 living in them. Of all households, 61.4% were married-couple households, 15.0% were households with a male householder and no spouse or partner present, and 18.7% were households with a female householder and no spouse or partner present. About 17.8% of all households were made up of individuals and 5.4% had someone living alone who was 65 years of age or older.

There were 27,045 housing units, of which 3.4% were vacant. The homeowner vacancy rate was 0.9% and the rental vacancy rate was 6.0%.

Racial composition as of the 2020 census
Race	Number	Percent
White	65,426	80.0%
Black or African American	1,208	1.5%
American Indian and Alaska Native	699	0.9%
Asian	1,869	2.3%
Native Hawaiian and Other Pacific Islander	560	0.7%
Some other race	4,652	5.7%
Two or more races	7,359	9.0%
Hispanic or Latino (of any race)	11,327	13.9%

=== 2010 census ===
As of the census of 2010, there were 67,311 people, 18,282 households, and 14,771 families residing in the city. The population density was 2,823.9 people per square mile (1,090.1/km^{2}). There were 19,145 housing units at an average density of 924.6 per square mile (356.9/km^{2}). The racial makeup of the city was 89.91% White, 1.61% African American, 0.53% Native American, 2.08% Asian, 0.27% Pacific Islander, 3.09% from other races, and 2.52% from two or more races. Hispanic or Latino of any race were 6.96% of the population.

There were 18,282 households, out of which 48.9% had children under the age of 18 living with them, 67.4% were married couples living together, 9.7% had a female householder with no husband present, and 19.2% were non-families. 15.2% of all households were made up of individuals, and 3.5% had someone living alone who was 65 years of age or older. The average household size was 3.19, and the average family size was 3.59.

The population was 35.1% under 18, 12.1% from 18 to 24, 30.3% from 25 to 44, 16.8% from 45 to 64, and 5.7% who were 65 years of age or older. The median age was 27 years. For every 100 females, there were 101.7 males. For every 100 females age 18 and over, there were 100.1 males.

The median income for a household was $52,128, and the median income for a family was $57,193. Males had a median income of $40,409 versus $26,646 for females. The per capita income for the city was $19,604. About 5.0% of families and 5.6% of the population were below the poverty line, including 7.0% of those under age 18 and 4.0% of those age 65 or over.

== Government ==
Layton City has a council/manager form of government with 290 full-time employees. The Layton City Council is composed of five members and a mayor. All members are elected by the residents of the city during a municipal election held every two years. Each seat consists of a four-year term. Council member terms are staggered. Two members and a mayor are elected at one time, and two years later, the other three members are elected. The Mayor and Council are responsible for setting city policy, and the City Manager is responsible for the day-to-day operations.

Joy Petro became mayor in 2019 and Alex R. Jensen has been the city manager since 1992. There are five city council members. As of 2020, the city council members are Tom Day (since 2013), Dawn Fitzpatrick (since 2020), Clint Morris (since 2019), Dave Thomas (since 2019), and Zach Bloxham (since 2019). City council meetings are held every first and third Thursday at 7:00 PM in the council chambers.

== Education ==
Layton has an extended branch of Weber State University and is part of Davis School District. The city has four high schools, six junior high schools, and fifteen elementary schools.

=== High schools ===
- Layton High School (est. 1966) - Davis School District
- Northridge High School (est. 1992) - Davis School District
- Northern Utah Academy for Math Engineering and Science (est 2004) - an early college charter high school that works in partnership with Weber State University.
- Layton Christian Academy (est. 1993) Private Christian School

=== Junior high schools ===
- Central Davis Junior High
- Legacy Junior High
- North Davis Preparatory Academy Junior High
- North Layton Junior High
- Shoreline Junior high
- Layton Christian Academy
- Fairfield Junior High

=== Elementary schools ===
- Sarah Jane Adams Elementary
- Crestview Elementary
- Ellison Park Elementary
- East Layton Elementary
- Heritage Elementary
- E.G. King Elementary
- Layton Elementary
- Lincoln Elementary
- Mountain View Elementary
- North Davis Preparatory Academy Elementary
- Sand Springs Elementary
- Sunburst Elementary
- Vae View Elementary
- E. M. Whitesides Elementary
- Layton Christian Academy
- Creekside Elementary

== Transportation ==
I-15 runs north–south through the center of town and serves Layton with three interchanges - (from north to south) Antelope Drive, Hillfield Road, and Layton Parkway. U.S. 89 runs north–south along the eastern edge of Layton, adjacent to the western slope of the Wasatch Mountains, and provides access to Weber Canyon via I-84 to the north in South Weber, then merges with I-15 and Legacy Parkway to the south in Farmington, near Lagoon Amusement Park. Utah State Route 177 runs north–south through western Layton, connecting the communities of western Davis County from Farmington @ I-15 to West Point, ending at a junction leading to State Route 193, thereby forming a makeshift north Davis County belt route. Utah State Route 193 runs east–west through northern Layton, past the south gate of Hill Air Force Base, connecting U.S. 89 to I-15 in Clearfield.

Utah Transit Authority (UTA) provides bus service and FrontRunner commuter rail. FrontRunner's Layton Station is located at the site of the former Union Pacific Layton Depot.

== Points of interest ==
Layton's major retail district includes the Layton Hills Mall, movie theaters, Davis Conference Center, and "Restaurant Row", nicknamed such due to the large number of national chain restaurants located along its one-mile stretch.

Layton's City Center includes the city offices, police station, and courthouse. Located nearby are Layton Commons Park, Davis Arts Council, Davis County Library Central Branch, Edward A. Kenley Centennial Amphitheater, Heritage Museum of Layton, Layton Surf 'N Swim, and Layton High School.

Adams Canyon, a popular hiking destination, is located east of Highway 89. Gambel Oak, Douglas Fir, and Fern Bush are a few plant species found along the trail. Chipmunks and various types of birds can also be found. The trailhead is located near the eastern terminus of SR193. The total length of the trail is approximately 3.7 miles (6.0 km) out and back.

On April 1, 2018, Russell M. Nelson, the former president of the Church of Jesus Christ of Latter-day Saints, announced the church's intention to build the Layton Utah Temple. Construction concluded in June, 2024, and was dedicated on June 16th, 2024 becoming the 22nd temple in Utah.

== Parks and trails ==
- Andy Adams Park 1713 E 1000 N
- Bamberger Trail
- Camelot Park 1400 W 2000 N
- Chapel Park 152 S 900 E
- Chelsie Meadows Park 1401 N 2575 W
- D&RG Trail
- Ellison Park - Splash Pad & Skate Park 700 N 2200 W
- Grey Hawk Park, 3500 Redtail Way
- Kays Creek Parkway Multiple Trail Heads
- Layton Commons Park 437 N Wasatch Dr
- Legacy Park 469 N 3200 W
- Oak Forest Park 2250 E 2400 N
- Sandridge Park 2555 N Church St
- Vae View Park 1600 N Main
- Veterans Park 175 W Gentile St
- Woodward Park 1505 N 25 E

== Notable people ==
- Julian Blackmon, NFL player
- Christine Cavanaugh, voice actress known for Babe
- Daniel Coats, former NFL player for the Cincinnati Bengals
- John Collins, basketball player, first-round selection in 2017 NBA draft
- R Adams Cowley, trauma surgeon who pioneered the treatment of shock trauma
- Tiffany Coyne, model on Let's Make a Deal
- Chuck Ehin, NFL player
- Sherman L. Fleek, military historian
- Kevin Garn, former majority leader of the Utah House of Representatives
- Dayan Lake, NFL player
- Shaun Todd McBride, artist and social media personality best known as Shonduras
- Court McGee, a mixed martial artist currently fighting in UFC
- Ruby Timms Price, first Black teacher in Utah
- Sterling W. Sill, a general authority for the Church of Jesus Christ of Latter-day Saints and local businessman
- Calvin Lee Vail, better known as LeafyIsHere or just Leafy; YouTube personality and critic
- YoungBoy Never Broke Again, rapper who currently resides in Layton due to ongoing legal issues

=== Local Acts ===
- Get Scared, heavy metal band from Layton

== See also ==
- List of cities and towns in Utah
