= Layton station (Oregon Short Line Railroad) =

Historic train depot in Layton, Utah, United States

- Layton Oregon Short Line Railroad Station
- U.S. National Register of Historic Places
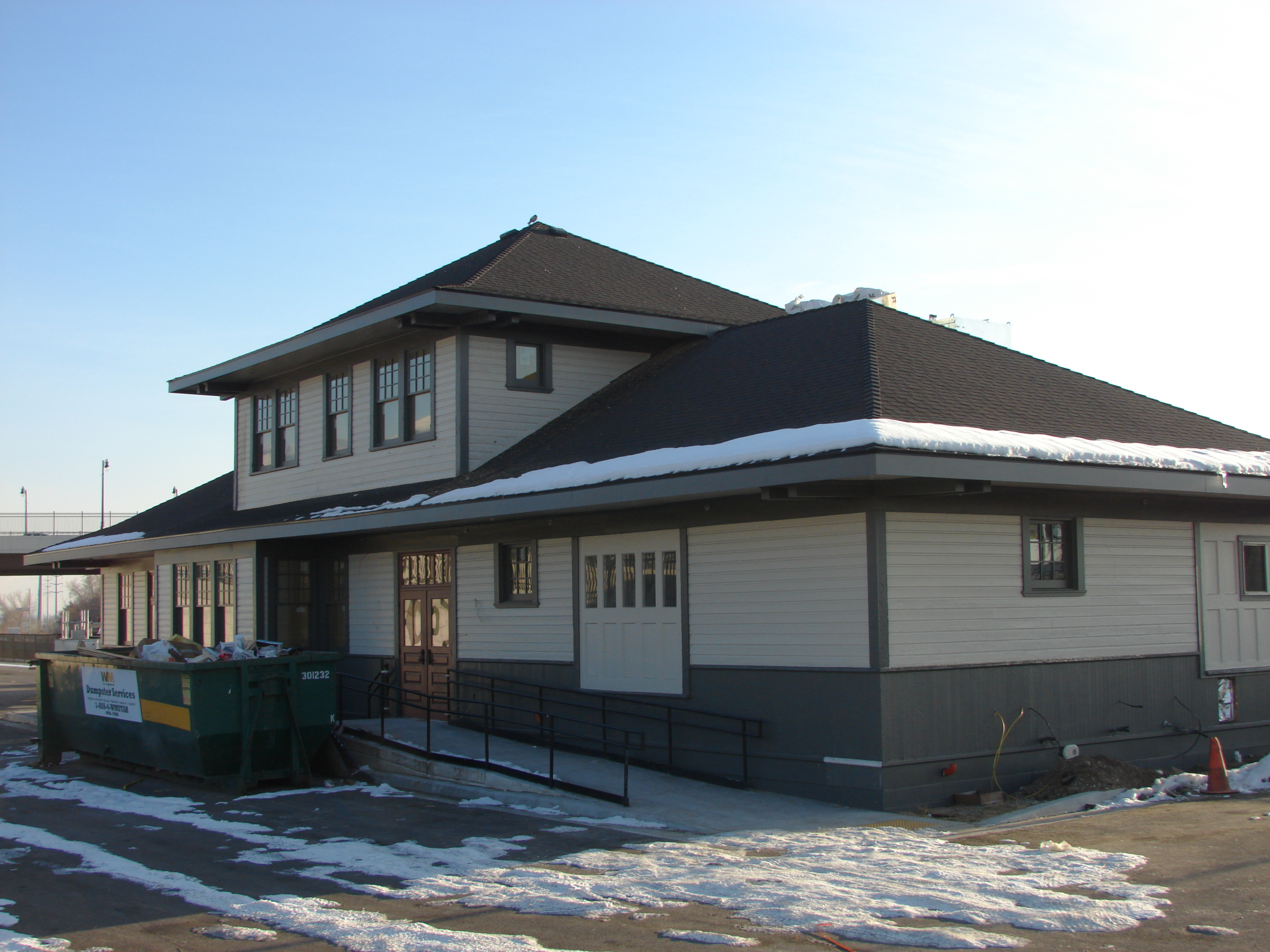
- East side of the depot

- Location within Utah Location within the United States
- Location: 200 S Main Street, Layton, Utah
- Coordinates: 41°3′24.71″N 111°57′52.49″W
- Built: 1912
- Restored: 2016–2017
- NRHP reference No.: 100001979
- Added to NRHP: January 18, 2018

The Layton Oregon Short Line Railroad Station is a historic railroad depot in Layton, Utah, United States. The depot was opened in 1912 alongside the tracks of the Oregon Short Line Railroad, which at that time was a subsidiary of (and later merged into) the Union Pacific Railroad. The depot was used for both freight and passenger traffic until the 1960s.

== Description ==
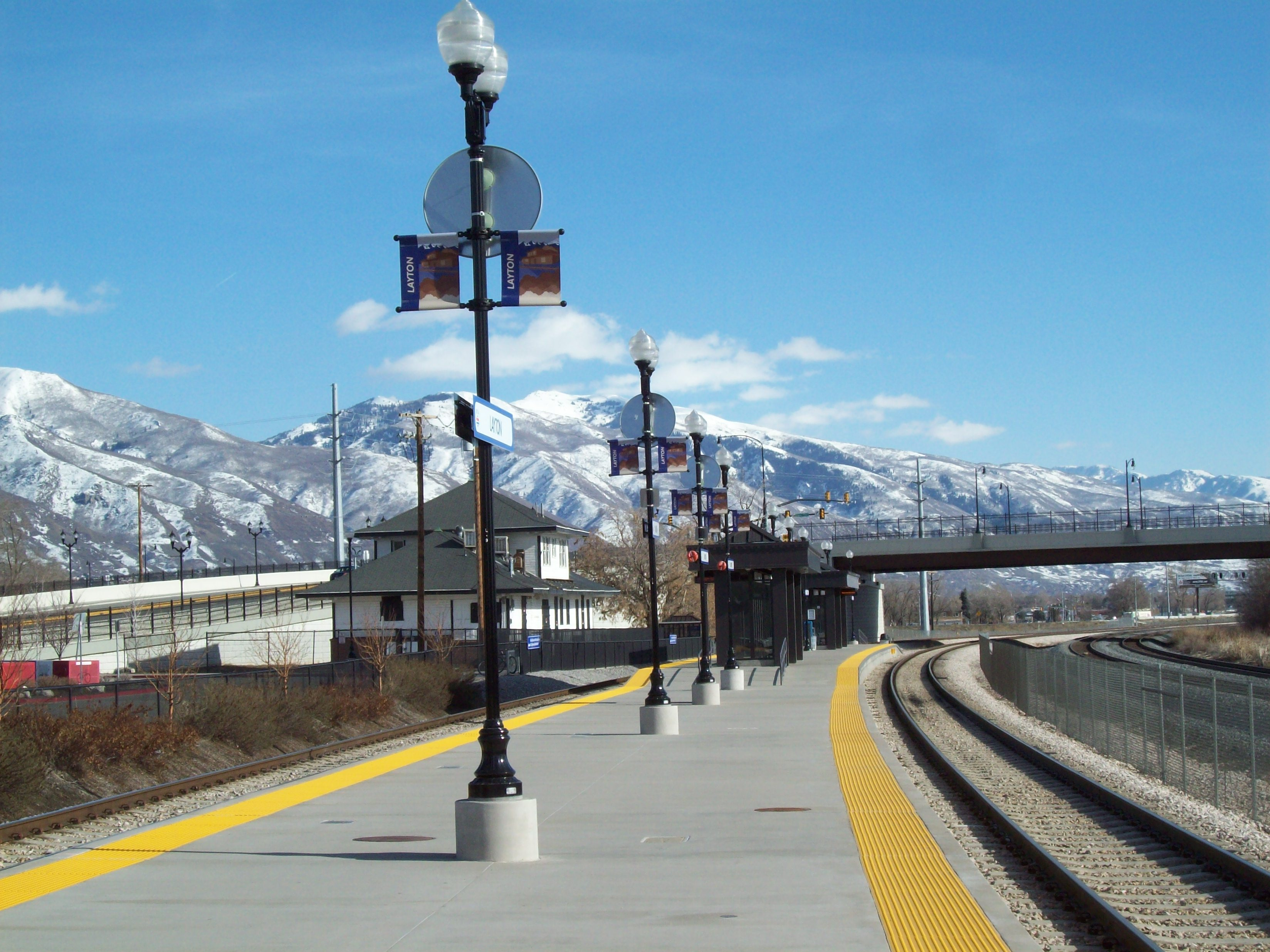
Location of the depot within the Layton FrontRunner station, March 2013

In 1972 the depot building was sold with the stipulation it be removed from the original site. The new owner moved the building approximately 1,200 feet to the southeast, flipping the original trackside of the building around to the east, but keeping the depot alongside the railroad tracks. The original site of the depot is just southeast of Layton's Veterans Park on Gentile Street. Following the move, the building housed a number of different businesses until 2010, when the Utah Department of Transportation (UDOT) purchased the building as part of the construction of a neighboring intersection. UDOT initially planned to demolish the building, but at the request of Layton City, it was decided to rehabilitate it instead. The building was sold and then restored in the years 2016–2017. It currently houses a Mexican food restaurant called Cafe Sabor.

The Layton Station of the Utah Transit Authority's FrontRunner commuter rail system is located next to the historic building. FrontRunner uses the same rail corridor in the area as the Oregon Short Line Railroad did when the depot was constructed in 1912.

== See also ==
- National Register of Historic Places listings in Davis County, Utah

Preceding station	Union Pacific Railroad	Following station
Clearfield toward Butte	Butte – Salt Lake City	Kaysville toward Salt Lake City
