= Northern Utah Academy for Math Engineering and Science =

Northern Utah Academy for Math Engineering & Science

Location
- 2750 N University Park Blvd, Layton, Utah; United States; 41.098982°N 111.983829°W

Information
- Type: Public charter
- Established: 2004
- Authorizer: Utah State Charter School Board
- Principal: Brenda Casper
- Teaching staff: 45
- Grades: 10-12
- Enrollment: 798
- Website: www.nuames.org

The Northern Utah Academy for Math Engineering and Science (NUAMES) is a public charter high school for students in grades 10-12. The school started to provide an educational experience that prepares high school students for an early transition into a university baccalaureate program in fields related to math, science and engineering. Students who have attended NUAMES for a full year and meet Weber State's admission requirements receive a scholarship to attend the university while they are also completing their high school diploma. Many students earn their associate degrees by the time they graduate. The NUAMES campus is on the Weber State University Davis campus in Layton, Utah. The principal is Brenda Casper, the assistant principal is Jamie Froerer and Nate Taggart is the director of business operations.

== Achievements ==
In the Utah Comprehensive Accountability System (UCAS) results published in September 2013, NUAMES was the highest-scoring high school in Utah with 541 points. It also received a letter grade of "A" in the state grading system.

NUAMES was recognized in 2010 by the U.S. News & World Report as being one of the best high schools in Utah. The publication gave NUAMES its bronze medal rating.

The Utah Office of Education gave NUAMES the Closing the Achievement Gap Award in 2010. This award is given to students who make adequate yearly progress in all subjects, and who reduce the achievement gap between different groups of students by at least 50%.
