= Layton Hills Mall =

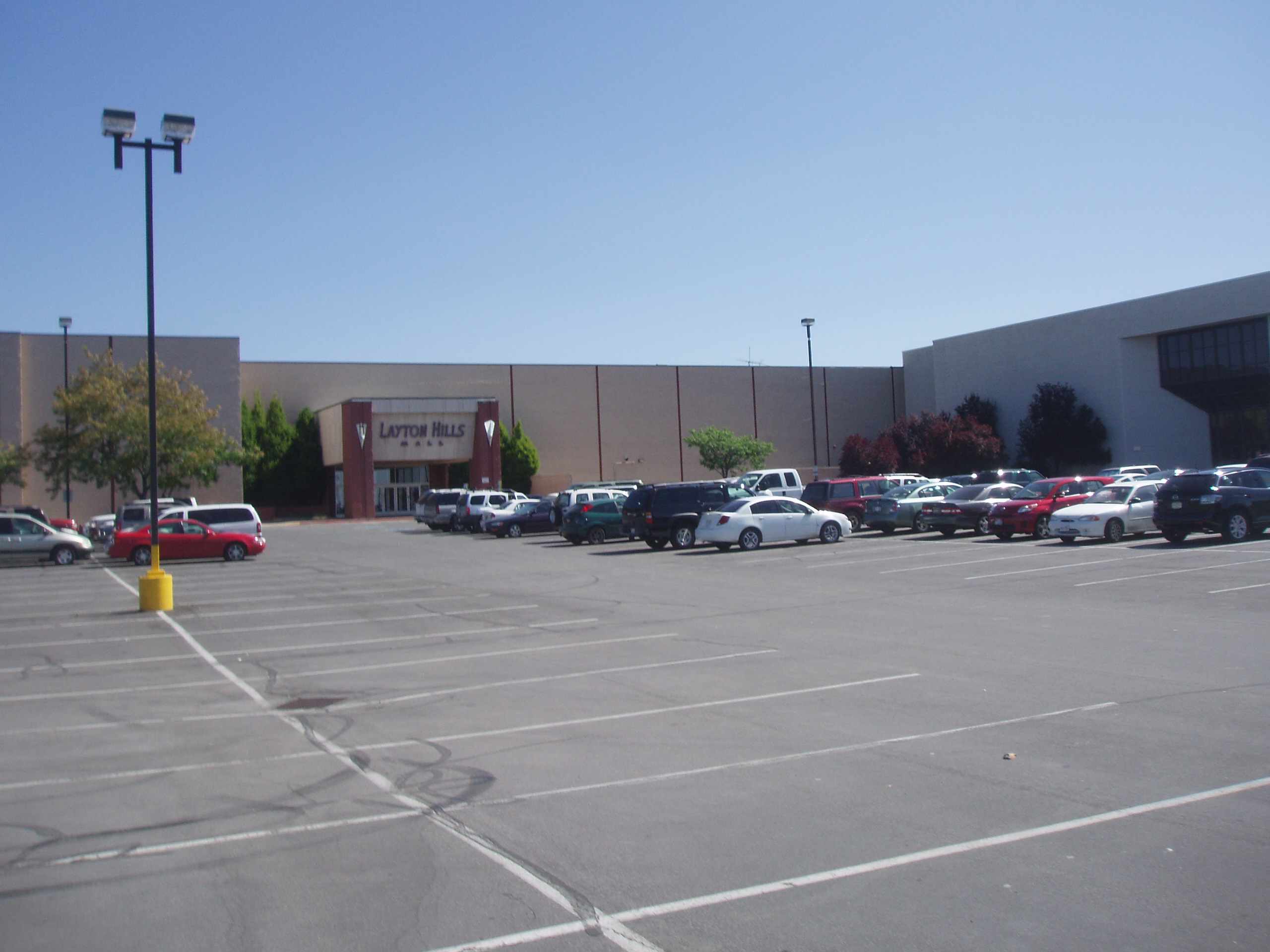
- Mall entrance in 2008
- Location: Layton, Utah, United States
- Coordinates: 41°04′42″N 111°58′39″W
- Address: 1201 N. Hill Field Road
- Opened: 1980
- Developer: Homco Development
- Manager: CBRE Group
- Owner: Second Horizon Capital
- Num. of stores: 100+
- Num. of anchor tenants: 3
- Floor area: 620,742 sq ft (57,668.8 m^{2}) (GLA)
- Floors: 2
- Parking: Free
- Website: shoplaytonhills.com

Layton Hills Mall is an enclosed shopping mall in Layton, Utah, United States. Opened in 1980, the mall features Dick's Sporting Goods, Dillard's, and JCPenney as its anchor stores.

== History ==
The mall opened in 1980 with Mervyn's and three local department stores: Zions Cooperative Mercantile Institution (ZCMI), Castletons and Auerbach's. After only one year in business, the Auerbach's store closed and became The Bon Marché. Castletons closed its store in 1987. The space became Herman's World of Sporting Goods, then Gart Sports and subsequently The Sports Authority. The upper level now houses the mall Food Gallery, with SeaQuest Interactive Aquarium on the lower level.

The Bon Marché closed its store in May 1993. JCPenney moved to the former Bon Marché building in November 1993, relocating from a standalone store in Bountiful. ZCMI sold its stores in 2001 to Meier & Frank, which was then sold to Macy's in 2006. Also in 2001, the mall expanded with 28 more stores. CBL & Associates Properties purchased the mall in 2005. Mervyns closed in 2008. In mid-2011, renovations began on the former Mervyns building to convert it to Dick's Sporting Goods on the lower level and mall shops on the upper level. Meanwhile, The Sports Authority moved to a new store in Farmington.

The Food Gallery on the upper level features nearly a dozen eateries, including national chains such as Chick-fil-A, Dairy Queen, Hot Dog on a Stick, and Subway. A children's play area, sponsored by Weber State University, is located on the lower level near the center court.

In 2017, Macy's announced they would be closing their store at Layton Hills Mall. The store closed in March 2017. Shortly after that, renovations began for a new Dillard's to replace Macy's. The store opened in fall 2017.

On June 4, 2020, it was announced that JCPenney would be closing as part of a plan to close 154 stores nationwide. However, that store was removed from the closing list and will remain open for now.

In August 2024, Florida-based Second Horizon Capital acquired the mall for $37.1 million from CBL Properties and announced plans to expand retail and entertainment options.
