= Margaret Barker =

Margaret Barker may refer to:

- Margaret Barker (actress) (1908–1992), American actress, director, producer, educator, and playwright
- Margaret Barker (artist) (1907–2003), British artist
- Margaret Barker (theologian) (born 1944), British Methodist preacher and biblical scholar
