= Layton station (FrontRunner) =

Commuter rail station in Layton, Utah, US

Layton
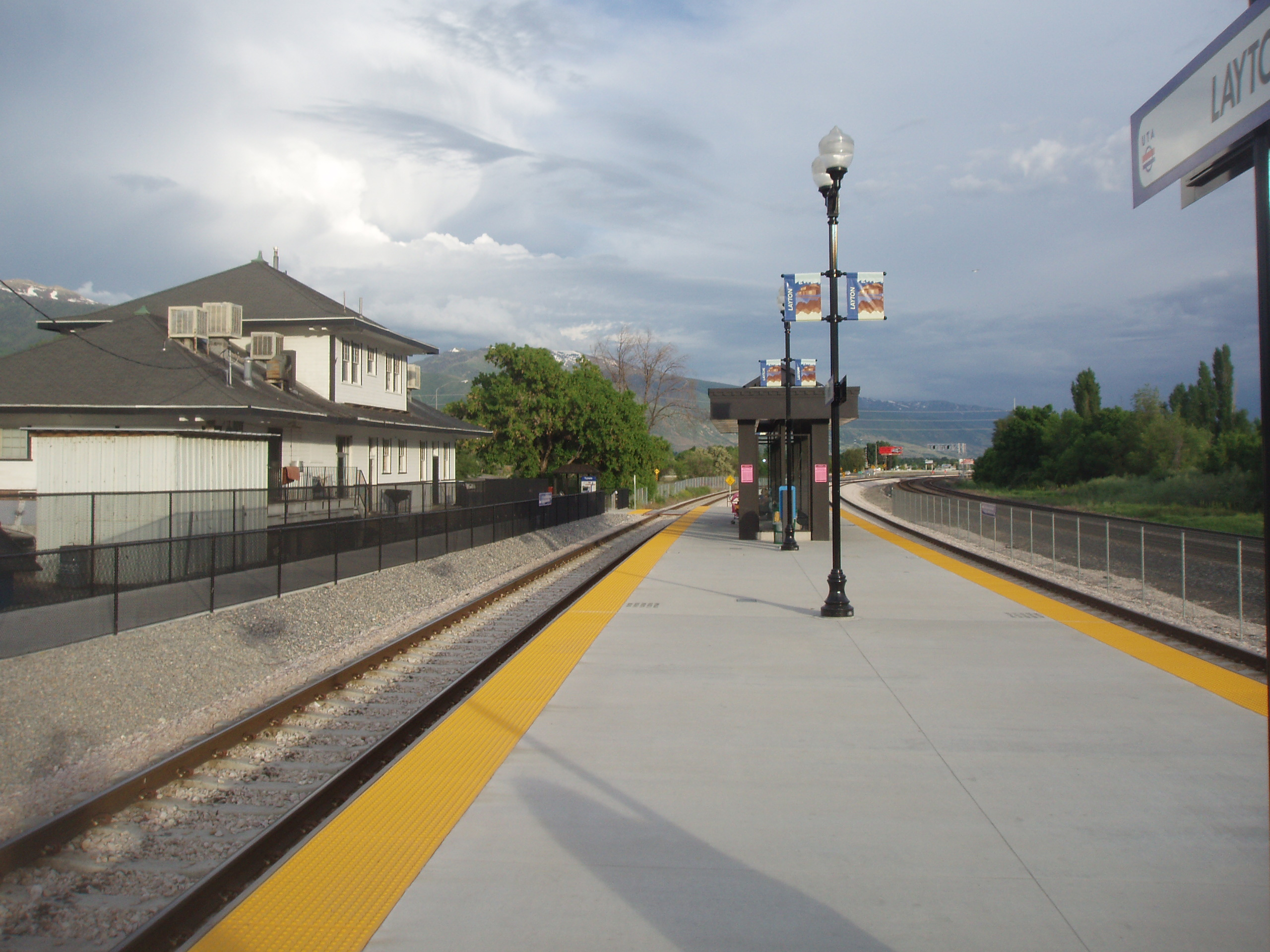
- Layton station platform

General information
- Location: 150 South Main Street; Layton, Utah; United States
- Coordinates: 41°03′25″N 111°57′54″W
- Owner: Utah Transit Authority (UTA)
- Platforms: 1 island platform
- Tracks: 2
- Connections: UTA: 470, 628, 677

Construction
- Parking: 383 spaces
- Accessible: Yes

History
- Opened: April 26, 2008; 18 years ago

Services
Preceding station	Utah Transit Authority	Following station
Clearfield toward Ogden Central	FrontRunner	Farmington toward Provo Central
Location

Layton station is a FrontRunner commuter rail station in Layton, Utah. It is operated by the Utah Transit Authority (UTA).

== Description ==
The station is located at 150 South Main Street (SR-126) on approximately 12.5 acres of land and is easily accessed from I-15 by way of the new Layton Parkway interchange. The station is near the south end of Layton's historic downtown area, which had suffered from a hard-to-access location in a highly acute wedge bounded by I-15 on the northeast and the railroad tracks on the southwest. Besides the station's opening on the site of the previous Union Pacific Layton Depot, access in the area has also recently been improved (both from I-15 and from surrounding parts of Layton) by the completion of the new Layton Parkway interchange on I-15, which is just south of the station.

The station has two free Park and Ride lots with about 380 total parking spaces available for day-use parking. However, a majority of these parking spaces are in the lot that is located just off South Main Street about one block north of the station. This lot can be accessed by either South Main Street or by a path that parallels the tracks and connects the north end of the platform with the parking lot. The station is located within the Quiet Zone, so trains do not routinely sound their horns when approaching public crossings within this corridor. The inaugural FrontRunner train departed the station southbound at 9:45 am April 26, 2008.
