= Municipal services =

Basic services provided by a local government

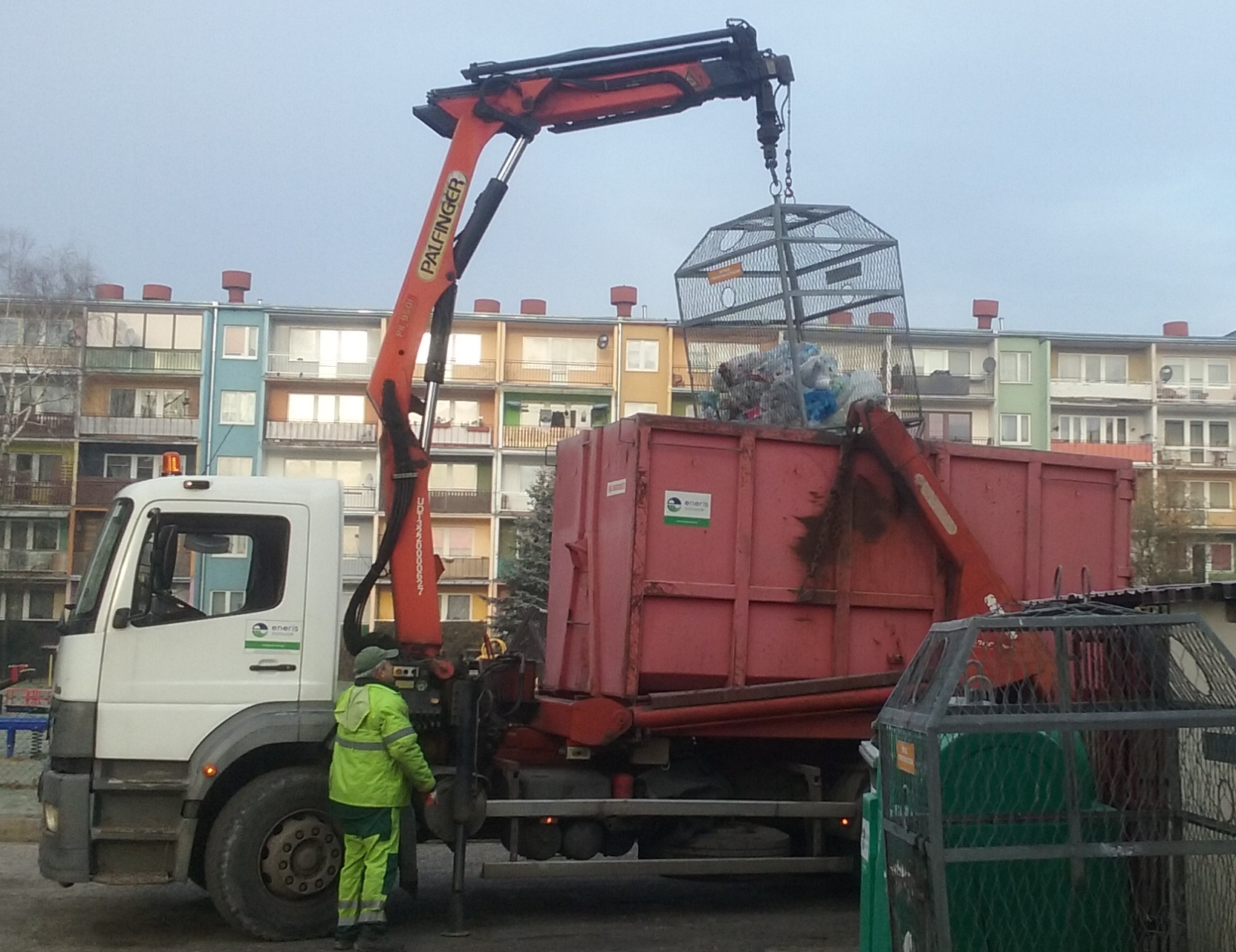
Emptying of segregated rubbish containers in Polish medium-sized city Tomaszów Mazowiecki

Municipal services or city services refer to basic services that residents of a city expect the local government to provide in exchange for the taxes which citizens pay. Basic city services may include sanitation (both sewer and refuse), water, streets, the public library, schools, food inspection, fire department, police, ambulance, and other health department issues and transportation. City governments often operate or contract for additional utilities like electricity, gas and cable television. Mumbai even provides a lighthouse service.

The available municipal services for any individual municipality will depend on location, history, geography, statutes and tradition. Provided services may vary from country to country or even within a country. Services may be run directly by a department of the municipality or be sub-contracted to a third party.

== Funding ==
Funding for the services provided varies with the municipality in question. Funding can include tax revenue (property tax, income tax, municipal sales tax), fees (such as building permits), Grants from other Governments, fines such as speeding or parking violations, usage fees for optional services, or other sources such as profits from municipally owned or operated utilities. Probably the greatest influence is the country in which the municipality is located.

In the UK, a combination of local taxation based on property value and central government grants is the main means of funding core services. This is supplemented by nominal fees for services provided (e.g. leisure facilities). For some services, a competitive fee is charged compared to commercial concerns that which allows a profit to be made. For other services, full commercial rates may be charged with municipally owned utilities or commercial property, for example. For the most part, services will be part subsidized by the municipality or fully subsidized by the municipality. In recent years, UK councils have been given some leeway in finding alternative funding which can be the simple sponsorship of flower baskets to the trading of surplus buildings and land for services from private firms. In certain notorious cases, local councils have used council funds to speculate on the money markets.

Municipalities in other countries may have other methods of funding (e.g. local income taxes or even from the profits of utilities or industrial concerns fully owned by the municipality).

== History ==
In the United Kingdom, until their abolishment, municipal corporations were powerful organizations. In their Victorian heyday, with the growth of urbanization and industrialization, they could be responsible for the promotion, organization, funding, building and management of everything from housing to water supplies, power in the form of both gas and electricity, to the introduction of electric trams; almost any activity that the city fathers thought was necessary to promote the economic, social and environmental well-being of their municipality.

However, special powers needed to be granted through local acts in Parliament (for example, the Manchester Corporation Waterworks Act needed for the construction of Manchester's reservoirs). As times changed, the municipal corporations continued to try to advance the cause of their municipalities. For example, in the 1930s aviation was the new technological frontier and municipalities worked to promote themselves with the development of municipal airports.

For the most part, UK municipalities lost their in-house utilities to the nationalisation and centralisation of public utilities. One notable exception is Kingston upon Hull, which still has a municipally owned telephone company known as Kingston Communications.

One trend in the UK, (in the name of efficiency) has been the privatisation of departments, the transfer of staff and assets to the new organisation and the contracting with the new organization for services to the council. This model has been used for services from road cleaning to social housing, to leisure facilities, though no council yet seems to dare to do so for more high-profile services such as schools and social services.

In the UK, fire and police services are not under direct municipal control, even when a force can be closely identified with a specific municipal area such as Greater London. However, fire and police services are in part paid for by a surcharge to local taxation, and although they have no say in operational matters, local government appoints members to a committee to oversee the running of each force.

== Geography ==
Where there is a substantial industrial urban population isolated from other conurbations, or when and where the growth in demand is so great that it becomes uneconomic or impractical for commercial organisations to provide, the municipalities concerned may assume functions necessary for the growth and functioning of the city.

This was the case in Victorian England also today in Mumbai, for example, the Municipal Corporation of Greater Mumbai and Brihanmumbai Electric Supply and Transport are the major municipal organizations which are needed to allow the city to function. The Los Angeles Department of Water and Power is a legacy of Los Angeles, which found itself in a similar position of rapid growth at the beginning of the last century. The similarly isolated Johannesburg has chosen to run its services as standalone and self-funding, corporate entities.

== See also ==
- Infrastructure
- Municipalization
- Museum
- Subsidization
- Theatre
- Urban secession
- cf. Community services
