= Warren Wilson =

Warren Wilson may refer to:

== People ==
- Warren B. Wilson (1920–1997), American professor of art and fine artist
- Warren Elvin Wilson, American professor of civil engineering and college administrator
- Warren Hugh Wilson (1867–1937), American rural sociologist and Presbyterian pastor

== Others ==
- Warren Wilson Beach House, a Los Angeles, California structure listed on the National Register of Historic Places
- Warren Wilson College, a U.S. private liberal arts college in Swannanoa, North Carolina
