= Station Park =

Station Park may refer to:

- Station Park, Forfar, a football ground in Forfar, Scotland
- Station Park, Nairn, a football ground in Nairn, Scotland
- Station Park (Farmington, Utah), a commercial development in the United States which included the Farmington FrontRunner (commuter rail) station
