= Weisbrod =

Weisbrod or Weisbrodt is a German surname that may refer to the following people:

- Brooke Weisbrod, American sportscaster and college basketball analyst
- Burton Weisbrod (born 1931), American economist
- Esther Charlotte Emily Weisbrodt Francis (1836–1913), German-American Mormon pioneer
- John Weisbrod (born 1968), American ice hockey player and manager
- Jörn Weisbrodt (born 26 1973), German arts administrator
- Jonathan Weisbrod, American film producer and screenwriter
- Wolfgang Weisbrod-Weber, United Nations Secretary-General's Special Representative

== See also ==
- Pueblo Weisbrod Aircraft Museum in Colorado, U.S.
- Weisbrod Memorial County Hospital in Colorado U.S.
