= Harmons =

American supermarket chain

Harmons Grocery Company
- Trade name: Harmons Neighborhood Grocer
- Company type: Private
- Industry: Retail
- Founded: 1932 (Salt Lake County, Utah)
- Founders: George Reese (Jake) Harmon and Irene Harmon
- Headquarters: West Valley City, Utah; United States
- Number of locations: 20 (1 flower shop) (2021)
- Products: Grocery
- Revenue: US$850 million (2021)
- Owner: Harmon family (100%)
- Number of employees: 4,000 (2021)
- Website: www.harmonsgrocery.com

Harmons Grocery Company, doing business as Harmons Neighborhood Grocer, is a supermarket chain located within the state of Utah, United States, with 20 stores throughout the Wasatch Front and in the St. George area. It was known as Harmons Your Neighborhood Grocer until 2020.

== Description ==
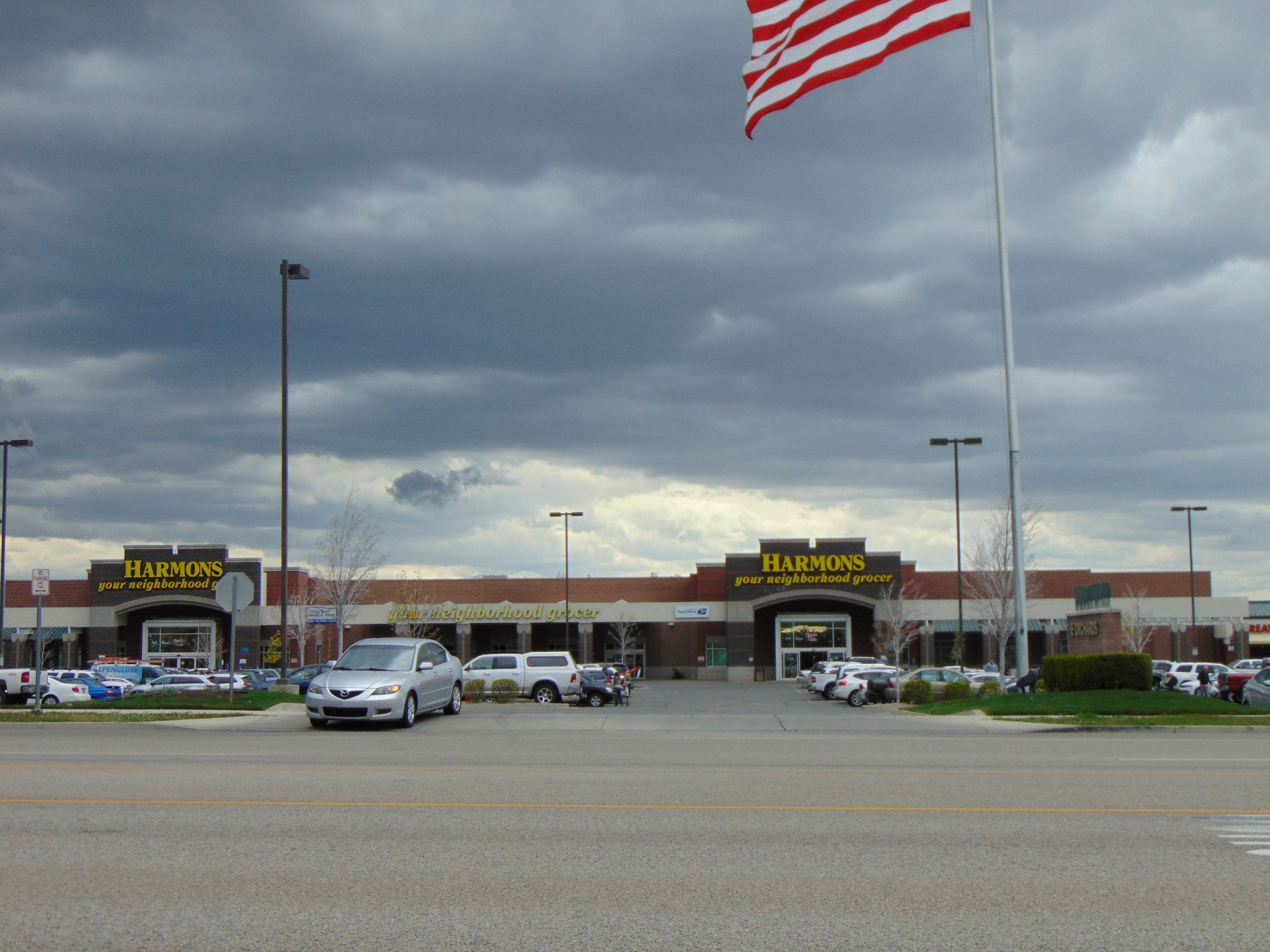
Harmons store in Orem, April 2016

In addition to selling groceries and some non-food items, Harmons also have pharmacies, post offices, full-time chefs, and some also have coffee bars, on-site dietitians, and cooking schools. The grocery store chain emphasizes sourcing from local companies and farms, and focuses on making many of their store brand products with higher-quality ingredients. In addition, many of their deli, bakery, and meat department products are made from scratch.

== History ==
In 1932, George Reese (Jake) Harmon and his wife Irene started a small grocery store called "The Market Spot" which initially sold fruit and vegetables. The couple lived in a small living quarters behind the store which was located at 3300 South and Main Street in Salt Lake County (modern day South Salt Lake). Soon, the store was selling many other grocery items. In 1942, after a vehicle collided with the store and caused serious structural damage, the Harmons went on to open a cafe. By 1945, the cafe was sold and a new grocery store, initially called "The Green Store", was opened at 4000 West and 3500 South. This site eventually became the first "Harmons Market" and is still a Harmons site today, although with a new structure (the original Harmons Market burned in 1971). A new replacement store became the first "Harmons Supermarket". By 1976, there were two Harmons, and by 1998, there were eight.

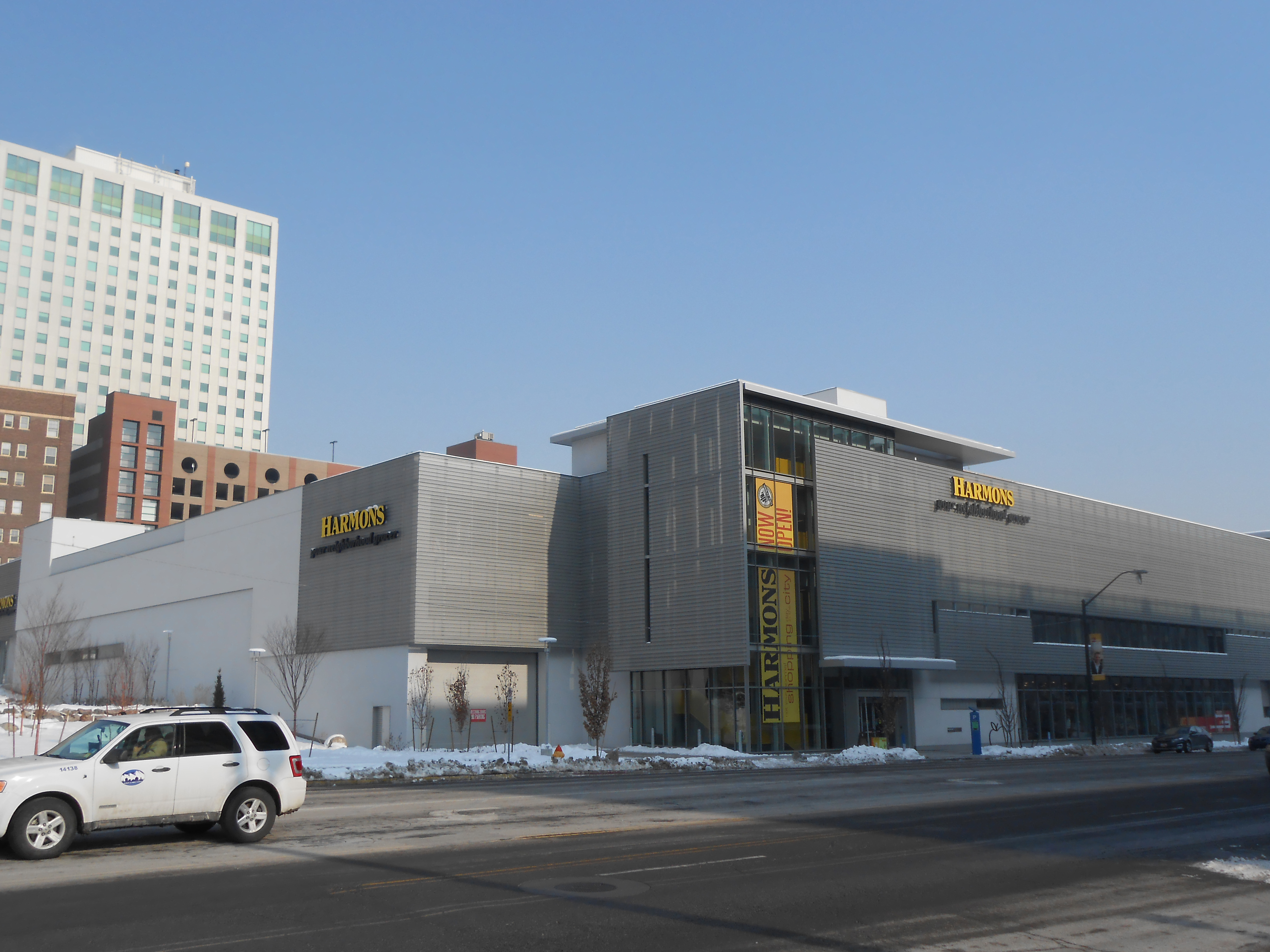
Harmons store at the City Creek Center in downtown Salt Lake City, January 2013

Since then, Harmons has more than doubled the number of locations. Despite the closing of its "5 Points" store in Northern Ogden near Harrisville in 2015 (which they sold to Ridley's Family Markets, which would also close their doors leaving the sizable property empty as of early 2020), Harmons has expanded somewhat aggressively throughout Utah. In 2011, they took over a 10,000-square-foot (930 m^{2}) (compared to the average size for Harmons of 68,000 square feet [6,300 m^{2}]), locally owned market known as Emigration Market, opening up their first "urban" location in the Yalecrest neighborhood in Salt Lake City, while also expanding into Farmington at the Station Park development. They expanded their urban presence with the opening of a new location on the east end of the City Creek Center development in the heart of downtown Salt Lake City in March 2012. They continued with another expansion phase in 2016, opening two locations in Santa Clara in southern Utah, and Lehi on the Wasatch Front. They opened their 18th store in Holladay - their 3rd "urban" location, in mid February 2018, while a 19th location opened in Riverton in mid-2018 as part of a major new mixed-use development.

At some point prior to 2004, Harmons would begin selling gas at their stores. They originally started with stores within Salt Lake County, Utah, speciallifally their West Valley, Midvale, Kearns, South Jordan and Draper locations. By February 2022, they had 14 locations offering fuel. Additionally, in an effort to Go Green, Harmons also started selling a "TIER 3" gas at all 14 fuel locations. A release on their website dated February 6th 2022 states that the TIER 3 gas is "cleaner, contains less sulfur, and creates less air pollution" vs others without this designation. Furthermore, the release states "Tier 3 refers to a set of national standards developed by the Environmental Protection Agency (EPA) that requires refineries to reduce the sulfur content in unleaded gasoline from an annual average of 30 parts per million (PPM) to 10 PPM."

In 2009, Harmons won the Utah Green Business Award from Utah Business Magazine.

In 2017, Harmons launched an online shopping platform for curbside pickup or delivery.

In 2020, Harmons dropped the word "Your" from the name, shortening it to "Harmons Neighborhood Grocer".

In 2021, Harmons began construction of another "urban" location near the North Shore area of the Daybreak development. This location opened on Apr. 27, 2022. It was also announced that the grocer plans to build a store in the Park City area as part of the Tanger Outlet redevelopment.

== Locations ==
=== Utah ===
==== Davis County ====
- Farmington - Station Park

==== Salt Lake County ====
- Draper
  - Draper
  - Bangerter Crossing
- Holladay - Holladay Market
- Kearns - Cougar
- Midvale - Seventh Street
- Riverton - Mountain View Village
- Salt Lake City
  - Brickyard
  - City Creek
  - Emigration Market
- South Jordan
  - The District
  - South Jordan
  - Daybreak
- Taylorsville
- West Valley City
  - Harmons Flower Shop
  - West Valley

==== Summit County ====
- Park City (Announced)

==== Utah County ====
- Lehi - Traverse Mountain
- Orem

==== Washington County ====
- Santa Clara
- St. George

==== Weber County ====
- Roy
