= 2011 Davis County windstorm =

In Utah, United States

A high wind storm which began early in the morning of December 1, 2011, reached wind speeds as high as 102 miles per hour (164 km/h) in Centerville, Utah, United States and surrounding cities. Fruit Heights, a neighborhood just 15 miles (24 kilometres) from the Utah State Capitol, saw gusts of up to 146 mph (235 km/h) during the event. Damage was reported throughout Davis County, and extending into Weber and Salt Lake counties, ranging from Ogden down to Salt Lake City. That morning Mayor Ron Russell of Centerville declared a local state of emergency. Due to the extensive damage, Davis County declared a state of emergency later that evening. The windstorm extended throughout the Western United States, with power outages and structural damage also reported in California and Nevada.

== Impact ==
The storm occurred late in the fall season, so most of the trees damaged in the storm were evergreens. More than 400 trees were down at the Davis Golf course alone due to the winds. Thousands of residences were without power throughout the day and into the evening. At one point, as many as 54,000 residences were without power. Calls flooded into Rocky Mountain Power that day from customers trying to get updates on when their power would be restored. Many residences of the area had difficulties attempting to call friends and families with their cell phones because of the surge in communications in the area. The Utah Transit Authority shut down the FrontRunner commuter rail service between Layton and Salt Lake City due to damaged train stations, debris on the train tracks, and power outages. A "bus bridge" was used to ferry passengers between the Layton and Salt Lake Central stations while repairs were made. Even though FrontRunner service resumed by mid-afternoon, the Farmington Station remained closed through the weekend while repairs to the station were completed.

Many schools in Davis School District were closed for the safety of the children and because many of the facilities were without power and damage to other schools in the district. Weber State University (WSU) also cancelled daytime classes at both its Ogden and Davis County campuses, with the Davis County campus remaining closed through the next day.

Overall damages from the storm were estimated to be $20 million. The estimated cost of the cleanup from the storm was $8 million for Centerville alone. Some citizens were left without power for days, caused by winds uprooting trees and sending them crashing down into power lines.

While no major injuries were reported due to the winds within Davis County, WSU reported that three of their students sustained minor injuries from being blown off their feet in parking lots or being hit by a door that was blown by the winds. The Utah Highway Patrol also reported several truck drivers suffered minor injuries as a result of their semi-trucks being blown over along the freeways. In addition, some injuries resulted from the cleanup and repair efforts, including individuals who fell off roofs and broke arms and legs. One individual in Kaysville fell through a carport roof, broke several ribs, and punctured a lung.

== See also ==
- 2020 Utah windstorm
- 2025 Southern California windstorm
