= Ridley's Family Markets =

Grocery store chain

- Type: Private; family business
- Industry: Retail (Grocery)
- Founded: 1984 (42 years ago) in Payson, Utah
- Founders: Jerry Ridley; Connie Ridley
- Headquarters: Jerome, Idaho, United States
- Number of locations: 30 (2024)
- Areas served: Colorado, Idaho, Montana, Nevada, Utah, Wyoming
- Key people: Donald Mark Ridley (President); Jerry Lee Ridley (Director); Constance Fay Ridley (Secretary)
- Products: Bakery, dairy, deli, frozen foods, general grocery, meat, pharmacy, produce, seafood, snacks, liquor
- Services: Supermarket; Drugstore
- Revenue: ▲ Unknown/Private Company
- Owner: Ridley family
- Number of employees: 2,000 (2021)
- Parent: Ridley Supermarket Holdings, Inc.
- Website: shopridleys.com

Ridley's Family Markets is a family-owned chain of grocery stores based in Jerome, Idaho, United States (but incorporated in Wyoming), with locations in Colorado, Idaho, Montana, Nevada, Utah, and Wyoming.

== Description ==
Although the company was founded in 1984 in Payson, Utah, it subsequently moved its headquarters to Boise, Idaho, and then Jerome. As of 2026, Ridley's operates 39 supermarkets in Idaho, Colorado, Utah, Nevada, Montana, and Wyoming, operating under the Ridley's and Macey's brands as well as including several stand alone pharmacies, Ace Hardware stores, and quick service restaurants under the Arctic Circle and Dairy Queen brand names. It also has a retail support center in Twin Falls, Idaho. In 2015, it was ranked as the 21st largest private company in Idaho. As of August 2017, the company's leadership was Anita Ridley (CEO), Donald "Mark" Ridley (President), Jerry Lee Ridley (Director), and Constance Fay Ridley (Secretary).

== History ==
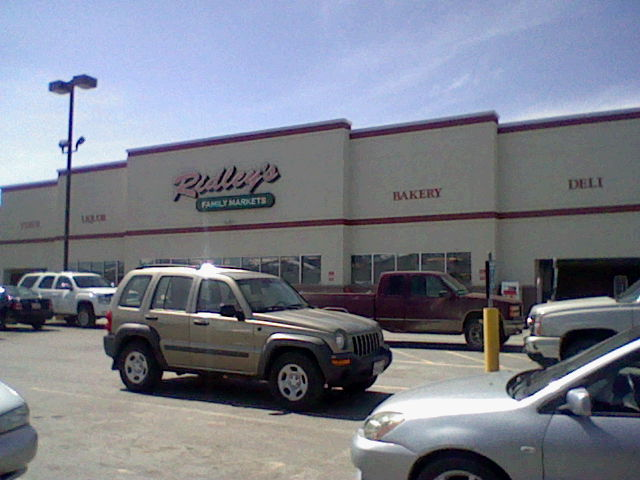
The Ridley's grocery store in Ely, Nevada, March 2010

In 1984, Jerry and Connie Ridley opened an 11,000-square-foot (1,000 m^{2}) grocery store in Payson, Utah. Ridley's first operated as an IGA franchise called Ridley's IGA Foodliner. In 1986, the couple sold the Payson store and began a partnership to build and operate a Food 4 Less store in Provo, Utah. In 1988, after grocery retailer Farmer Jack closed their stores in Idaho and Utah, the Ridleys decided to sell their share of the Food 4 Less store to acquire three former Farmer Jack stores in Idaho. Ridley's Food Corporation was incorporated that same year as a privately held company with its headquarters in Boise, Idaho. Throughout the 1990s, Ridley's began acquiring several grocery stores in Idaho, including two Smith's Food and Drug stores in Boise (1992) and two Sprouse-Reitz stores in Emmett and McCall (1994). Each of these four stores were eventually closed or relocated. In 2004, the first Ridley's Family Markets store in Utah was opened in the city of Tremonton. In 2007, Ridley's ranked as the 36th largest private company in Idaho.

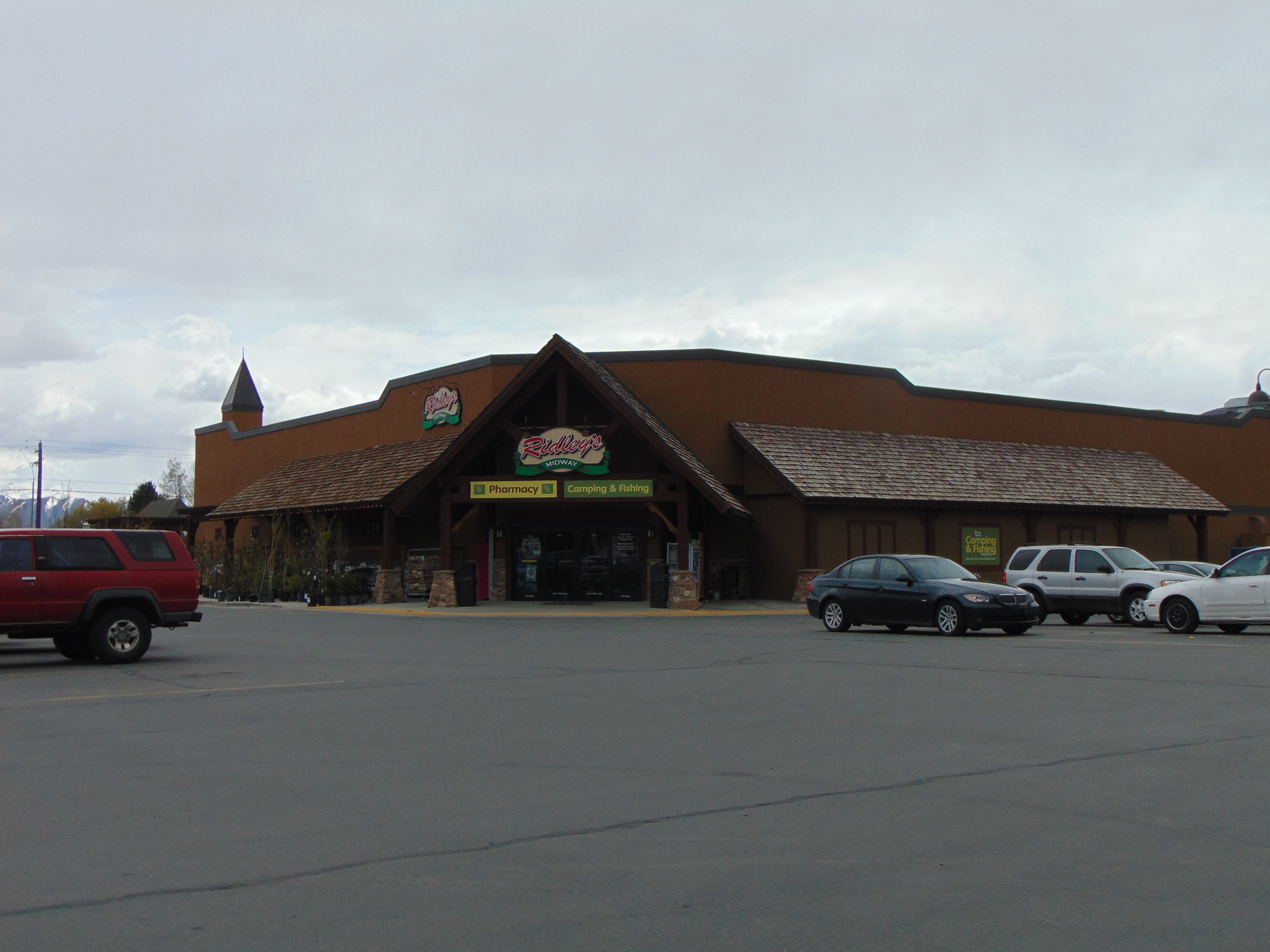
The Ridley's grocery store in Midway, Utah, April 2016.

The retailer's first stores in Nevada (Ely) and Wyoming (Pinedale) opened in 2007 and 2008, respectively. As of 2008, Ridley's had 15 stores and 600 employees. Between 2008 and 2010, it acquired three Albertsons stores in Blackfoot, Idaho and Orem, Utah. Following the purchase of three pharmacies in Idaho and Nevada, Ridley's opened the first free-standing pharmacies in the company's history in 2010. In August 2011 Ridleys Family Markets. Inc. was incorporated in Wyoming. On December 20, 2014, it was announced that Ridley's would be buying four grocery stores in Wyoming: two Safeway stores in Casper, one Safeway in Sheridan, and an Albertson's store in Laramie. The stores were being sold by Associated Food Stores, a grocery wholesaler and co-op that facilitates such deals. At the time, Ridley's had 24 stores and approximately 2,000 employees. In July 2015, it announced the purchase of a Harmons grocery store in Ogden, Utah, soon to become a new Ridley's location (although its sign read 'Wangsgards, a Ridley's Family Market'). In December 2015, the two then existing companies (Ridley's Food Corporation and Ridley's Family Markets, Inc.) were merged, with later being the surviving and current company.

Since the late 1990s, Ridley's has been supplied by Associated Food Stores. The company was previously supplied by Fleming Foods. In 2015, Ridley's Family Markets was listed as the 21st largest private business headquartered in Idaho.

=== Electronic retailing ===
Electronic marketing innovations that Ridley's had developed around its customer loyalty program were recognized in 2006 with a Global Electronic Marketing award. Program features recognized by the award included customizable shopping lists, card points that could be redeemed for rewards and discounts, and email delivery of weekly ads. In 2008, it was announced that Ridley's would conduct an experimental implementation of electronic coupon clearing in one of its stores. This is an innovation that transfers coupon redemption information from retailers to manufacturers electronically, with the goal of eliminating the transaction costs and other problems involved with traditional methods of coupon processing. Although this technology has many perceived advantages, it had not been successfully implemented on a large scale.
