= Barnard–Garn–Barber House =

Historic house in Utah, United States

- U.S. National Register of Historic Places
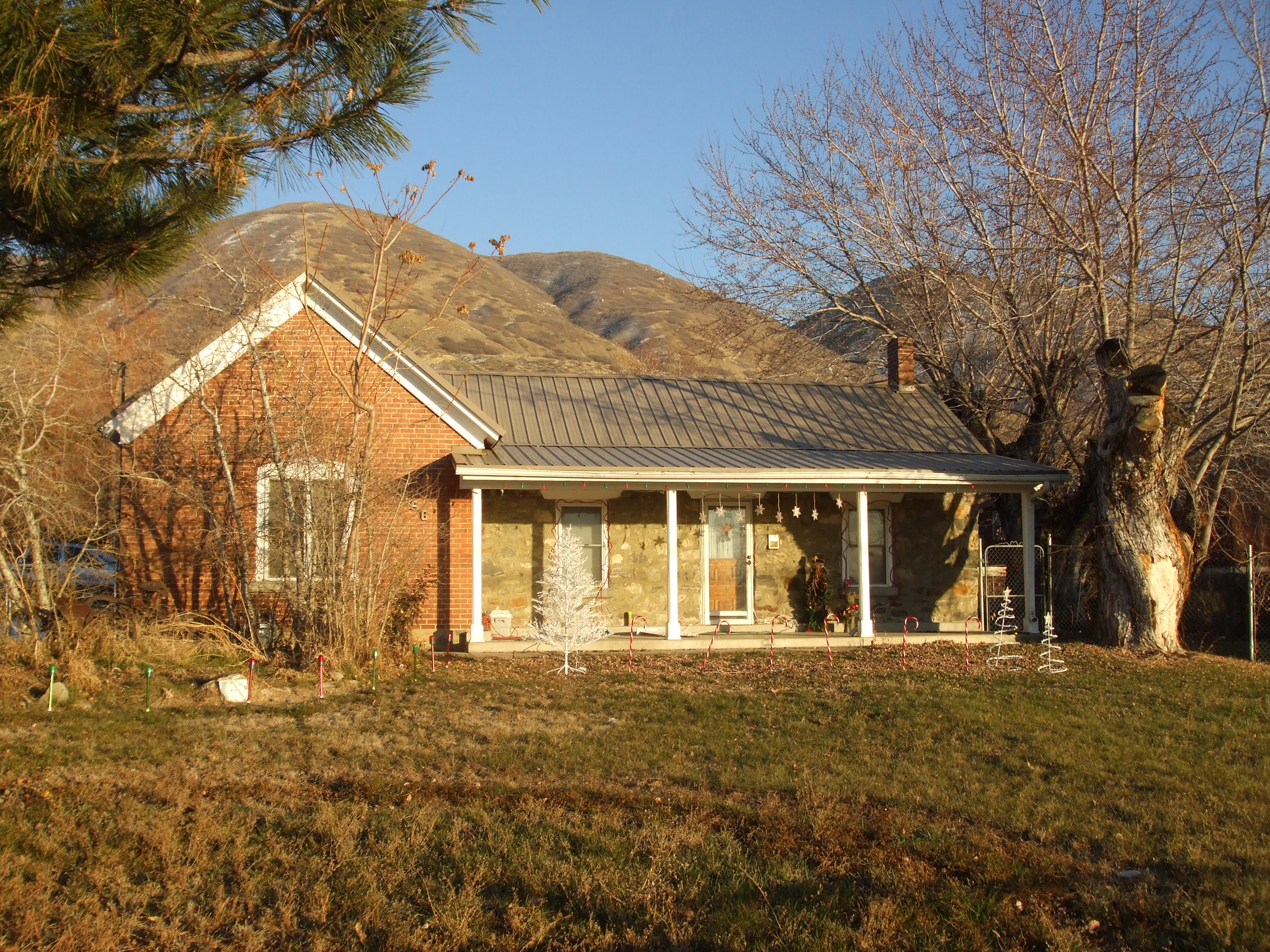

- Location within Utah Location within the United States
- Location: 1198 N. Main St., Centerville, Utah
- Coordinates: 40°55′54″N 111°52′43″W
- Area: 0.4 acres (0.16 ha)
- Built: c.1854, c.1870, and c.1898
- Architectural style: Mid 19th Century Revival, Late Victorian
- MPS: Centerville MPS
- NRHP reference No.: 97001309
- Added to NRHP: November 17, 1997

The Barnard–Garn–Barber House, at 1198 N. Main St. in Centerville, Utah, was built in phases in c.1854, c.1870, and c.1898 It was listed on the National Register of Historic Places in 1997.

It was built as a stone hall–parlor house by James Barnard, and a second stone part of the house was built by Micah and Fanny Garn. The Thomas and Julia Barber family added a brick extension at the rear and added a Victorian style brick gable end that faces to the front. The house has historic significance for representing stages of growth of Centerville, and, at the time of its NRHP nomination in 1997, was well-preserved.
