= Francis Peak =

Mountain in Utah, United States

- Location within Utah

Highest point
- Elevation: 9524+ ft (2903+ m) NAVD 88
- Prominence: 500 feet (152 m)
- Coordinates: 41°01′59″N 111°50′18″W

Geography
- Location: Davis County, Utah, U.S.
- Parent range: Wasatch Range
- Topo map: USGS Peterson

Francis Peak, elevation 9,560 feet (2,910 m), was named in honor of an early American pioneer, Esther Charlotte Emily Weisbrodt Francis, who contributed to the colonization of the Morgan Valley in Morgan county in Utah. One of the taller peaks of the Wasatch Range, Francis Peak is located on the border between Morgan and Davis counties; approximately 18 miles (29 km) north of Salt Lake City, Utah, United States.

The summit is seasonally accessible by hiking, biking, recreational vehicles, and automobile. The unpaved roads are mostly one-lane, steep, switchbacked and cliff-hanging/rocky in spots, perhaps best handled by smaller 4-wheel drive vehicles. Views of the valleys below are spectacular. As of Summer 2021, Google maps proved accurate. Download your GPS plan beforehand since cell service on the mountain is sketchy, and there are unmarked side roads. Vehicles can access the peak via Skyline Drive in Bountiful and Farmington Canyon Road in Farmington. Camping sites, trails, small ponds, wildlife, and great vistas are part of this rugged natural setting.

Atop the peak are domed radar towers constructed in 1959 and operated by the Federal Aviation Administration and Air National Guard.

== Elevation Dispute ==
U.S. Geological Survey lists Francis Peak as 9,547 feet above sea level. However, that was before the late 1950s construction, adding two radar domes. The natural height there now is 9,515 feet. The base of the radar facility adds 55 feet, and the domes chip in 60 feet more for a total extra artificial height of 115 feet and a grand total of 9,630 feet above sea level.

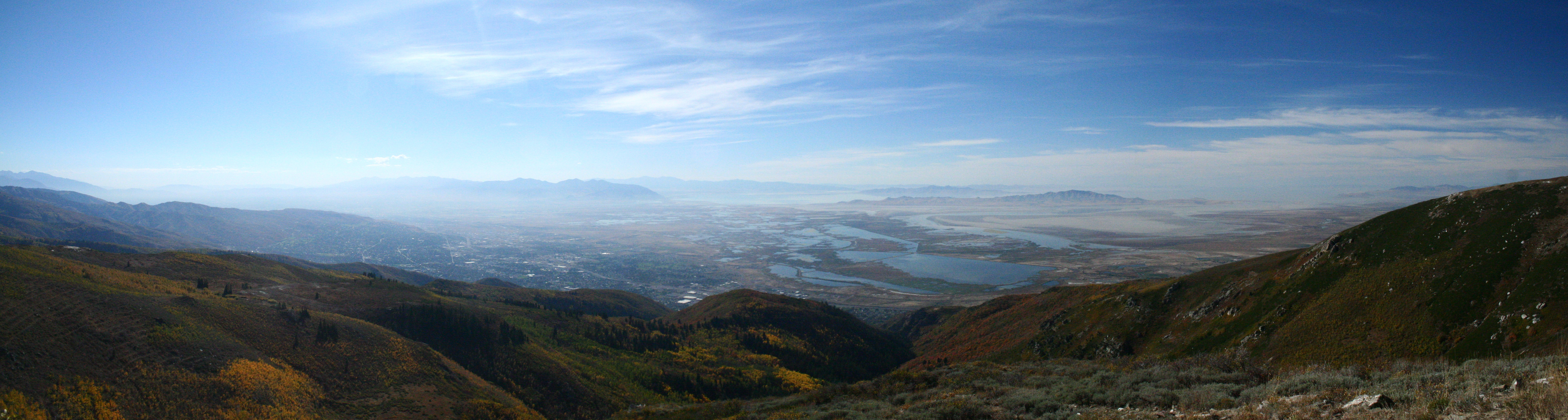
Panoramic view Great Salt Lake from Francis Peak

== See also ==
- List of mountains in Utah
