= 2020 Utah windstorm =

2020 natural disaster in the U.S. state of Utah

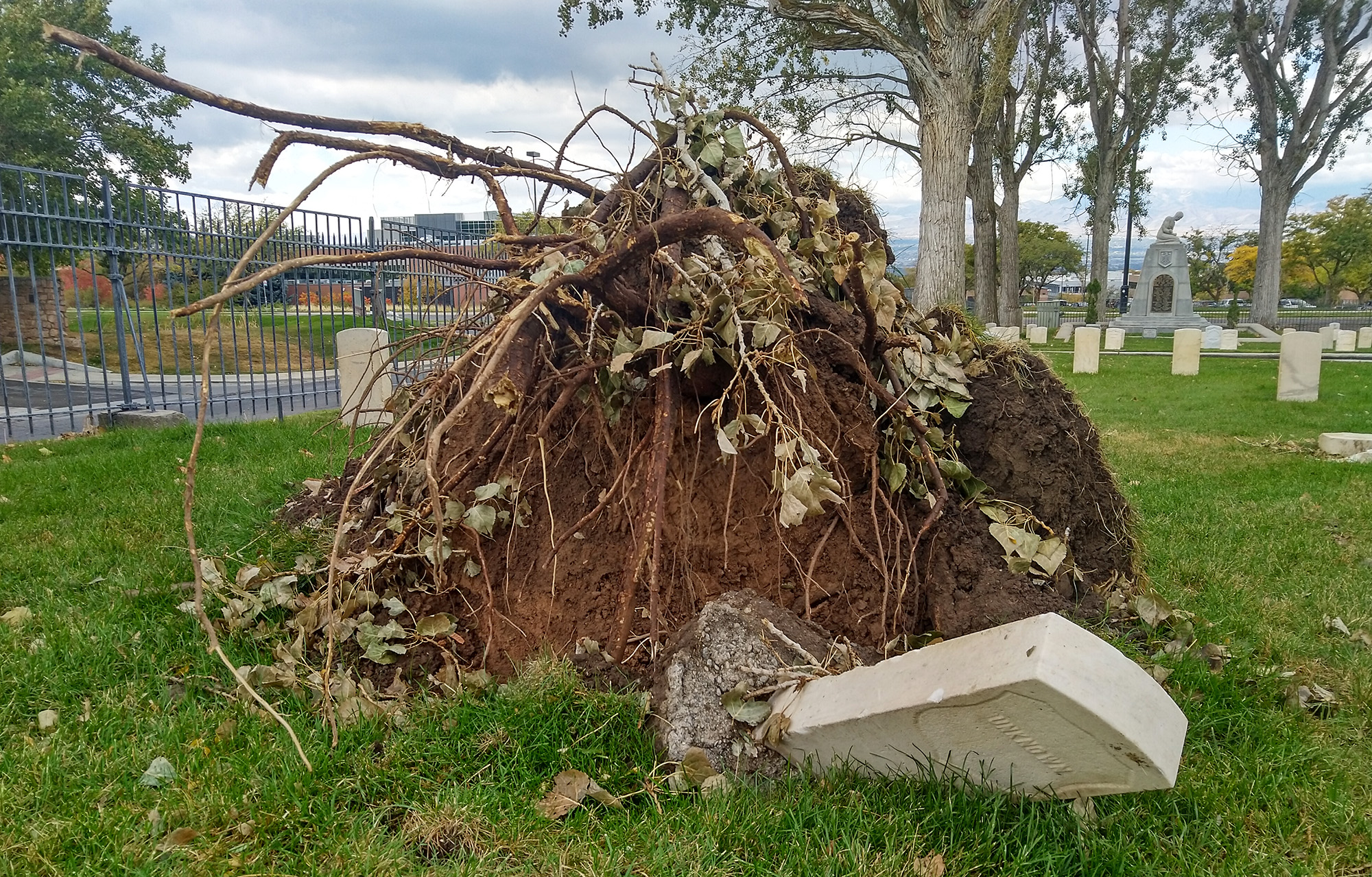
- View of a damaged grave at Fort Douglas, the result of a fallen tree.

Meteorological history
- Formed: September 7, 2020
- Dissipated: September 8, 2020

Windstorm
- Highest gusts: over 100 mph (160 km/h)
- Lowest temp: 20 °F (−7 °C)

Overall effects
- Fatalities: 1
- Areas affected: Utah
- Power outages: 200,000+ households

The 2020 Utah windstorm was a hurricane-force windstorm that struck the U.S. state of Utah in the early morning of September 8, 2020. It is estimated that the windstorm had reached a 12 rating on the beaufort scale.

== Impact ==
A wind gust at the University of Utah was recorded at 112 mph (180 km/h). Nearly 200,000 homes and businesses lost electrical power. Thousands of trees were toppled, causing much damage and closing dozens of parks. More than 100,000 residents were still without power by September 9. By September 11, just under 35,000 households were still without power. Almost one week after the windstorm, about 4,700 residents were still without power. Many roads and parks were closed for several days to clean up the debris. School classes were also cancelled that day.

=== Casualties ===
At around 8:21 AM, 61-year-old truck driver, Donald Hardy was supposed to deliver a shipment from Tennessee to South Salt Lake, Utah when the wind knocked him to the ground, causing him to hit his head hard on the pavement. He was killed instantly.

== Response ==
Governor Gary Herbert called the Utah National Guard and declared a state of emergency. The previous time the Utah National Guard was called was for the 2011 Davis County windstorm.

== Causes ==
An Arctic system moved into Utah from the northeast. Then a cold front swept through from the east Monday night (September 7) into Tuesday morning. It was later followed by the low-pressure system that pushed out the vacating high-pressure system that had previously set up across the state. Temperatures were brought from the 90s down to the 40s Fahrenheit, while snow flurries were also reported in the Salt Lake City metropolitan area. It was part of the same weather system that caused the 2020 Western United States wildfire season.
