= Franklin and Amelia Walton House =

Historic house in Utah, United States

- U.S. National Register of Historic Places
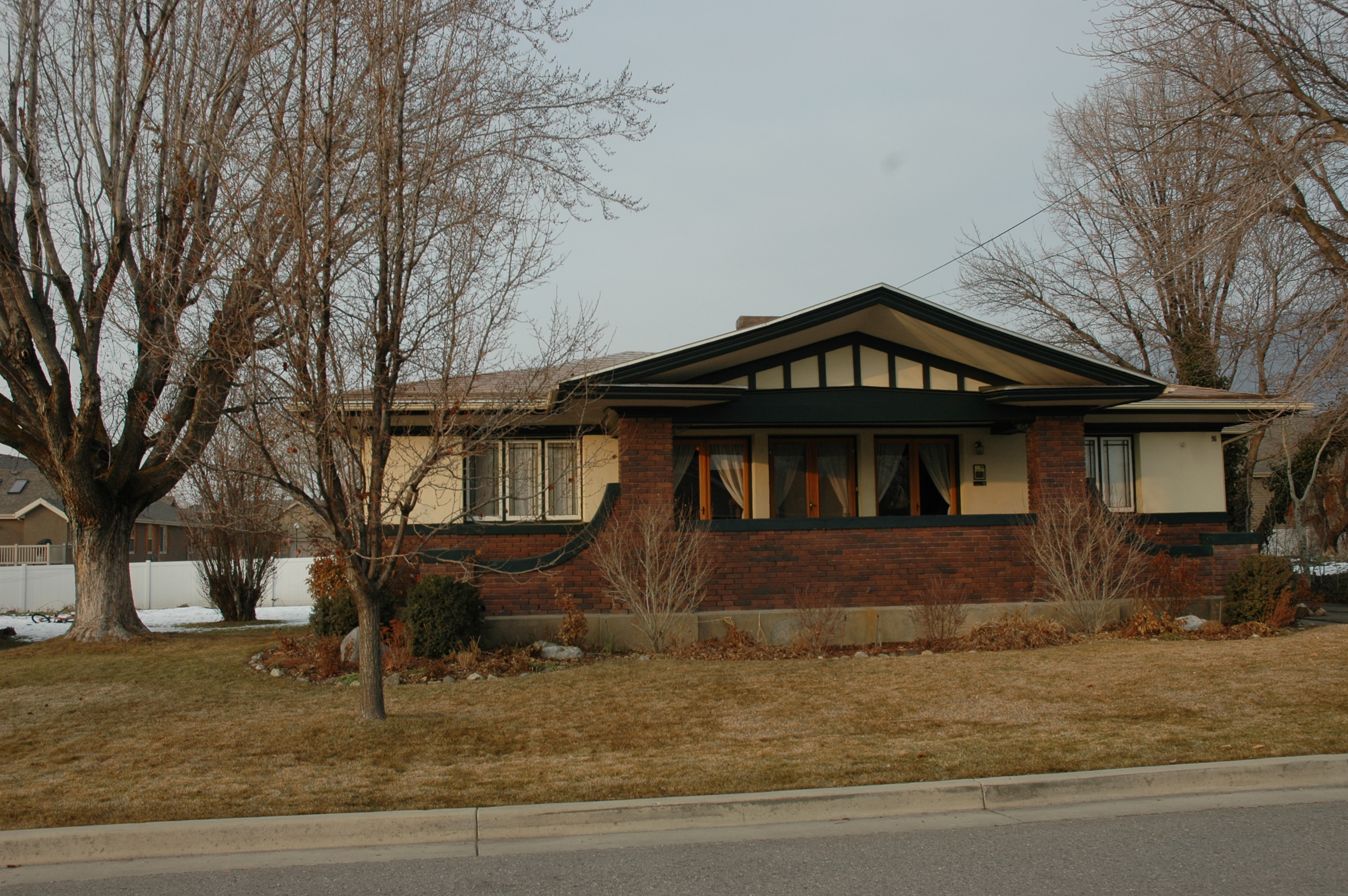

- Location within Utah Location within the United States
- Location: 96 W. 280 South, Centerville, Utah
- Coordinates: 40°54′53″N 111°52′50″W
- Built: 1916
- Architectural style: Prairie School, Bungalow/craftsman
- MPS: Centerville MPS
- NRHP reference No.: 97001323
- Added to NRHP: November 17, 1997

The Franklin and Amelia Walton House is a Prairie School style bungalow built in 1916 in Centerville, Utah, United States. The home remains in almost original condition, including original kitchen cabinets, push button light switches, original woodwork, casement windows and hardware. The home was listed on the National Register of Historic Places in 1997 and is currently in use as a private residence.

Franklin Walton was born November 6, 1881, and died April 24, 1955. He served a mission for the LDS Church in England and worked his entire life for Porter-Walton Walton nursery, eventually retiring as vice president.

Amelia (Porter) Walton was born January 25, 1883, and died March 8, 1973. She worked as a teacher, was active in civic affairs, the Daughters of Utah Pioneers, and in the LDS Church.
