= Centerville, Utah =

City in Utah, United States

- City
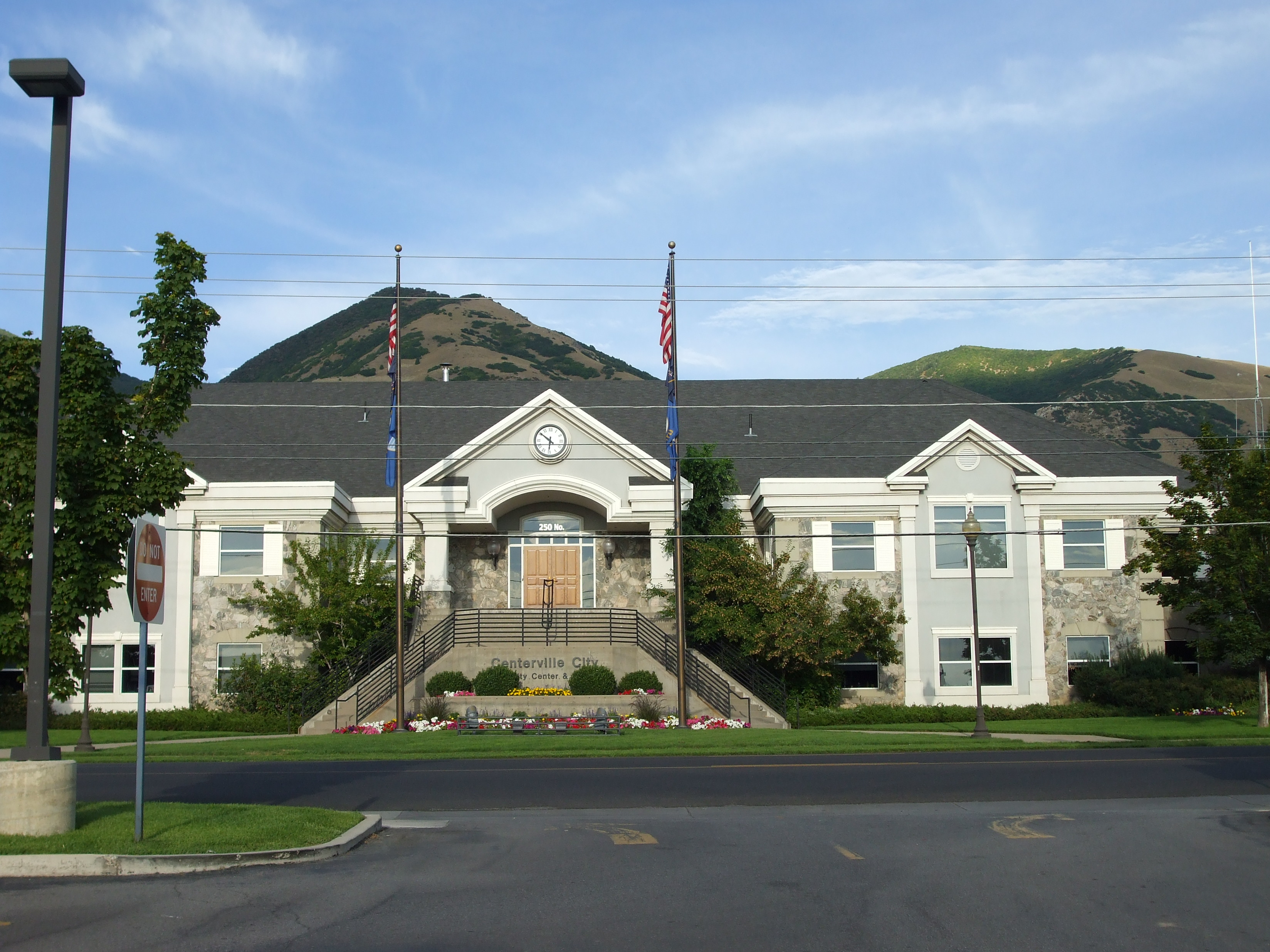
- Centerville City Hall, August 2008
- Nickname: C-Ville
- Motto: Making Life Better
- Location in Davis County and the state of Utah.
- Coordinates: 40°55′27″N 111°52′48″W
- Country: United States
- State: Utah
- County: Davis

Area
  - Total: 6.03 sq mi (15.61 km^{2})
  - Land: 5.97 sq mi (15.45 km^{2})
  - Water: 0.066 sq mi (0.17 km^{2})
- Elevation: 4,246 ft (1,294 m)

Population (2020)
  - Total: 16,884
  - Density: 2,948.8/sq mi (1,138.52/km^{2})
- Time zone: UTC-7 (Mountain (MST))
  - Summer (DST): UTC-6 (MDT)
- ZIP code: 84014
- Area codes: 385, 801
- FIPS code: 49-11980
- GNIS feature ID: 2409425
- Website: centervilleutah.gov

Centerville is a city in southeastern Davis County, Utah, United States. Centerville is part of the Ogden-Clearfield Metropolitan Statistical Area. The population was 16,884 at the 2020 census. It is located adjacent to the easternmost part of the Great Salt Lake.

== History ==
Centerville was first settled by Thomas Grover in the autumn of 1847. The community was originally known as Deuel Settlement but was renamed to Cherry Creek after the Cherry family arrived. After an 1850 survey found the town was located precisely between Farmington and Bountiful, it became known as Centerville, and it was this name that stuck.

- In 1849, Shadrach Roundy's family farmed in the general vicinity of Centerville, and in the winter of 1849 he built a grist mill on Deuel Creek. He also made molasses from corn stalks at this mill.
- In 1851, a log school house was built in Centerville but was replaced by an adobe building in 1854 by a much larger building in 1862.
- Centerville was the home of Latter-day Saint church leader B. H. Roberts.
- In 1869, the Utah Central Rail Road reached Centerville.
- On May 4, 1915, Centerville City was incorporated by the State of Utah.
- In 1983, abnormally high rates of precipitation for several months culminated in a series of mudslides and flooded creeks in Centerville and throughout Northern Utah.
- In December 2011, a severe wind storm caused power outages and over $8 million in damage.

=== Ecclesiastical history ===
The first branch of the Church of Jesus Christ of Latter-day Saints (LDS Church) in Centerville was organized in 1850 with Sanford Porter as president. In 1852, Centerville was made a ward with Sanford Porter as bishop. In 1868, an LDS Sunday School was organized with Nathan Tanner Porter as president. In 1869, a Relief Society was organized with Mary Ann Harmon as president. In 1874, a branch of the United Order was organized in Centerville with William R. Smith as president. In December 1917, the Centerville Ward was divided into the Centerville 1st and Centerville 2nd Wards. In 1930, the two Centerville Wards had a combined membership of 823.

Today, there are four stakes of the LDS Church in Centerville.

== Geography ==
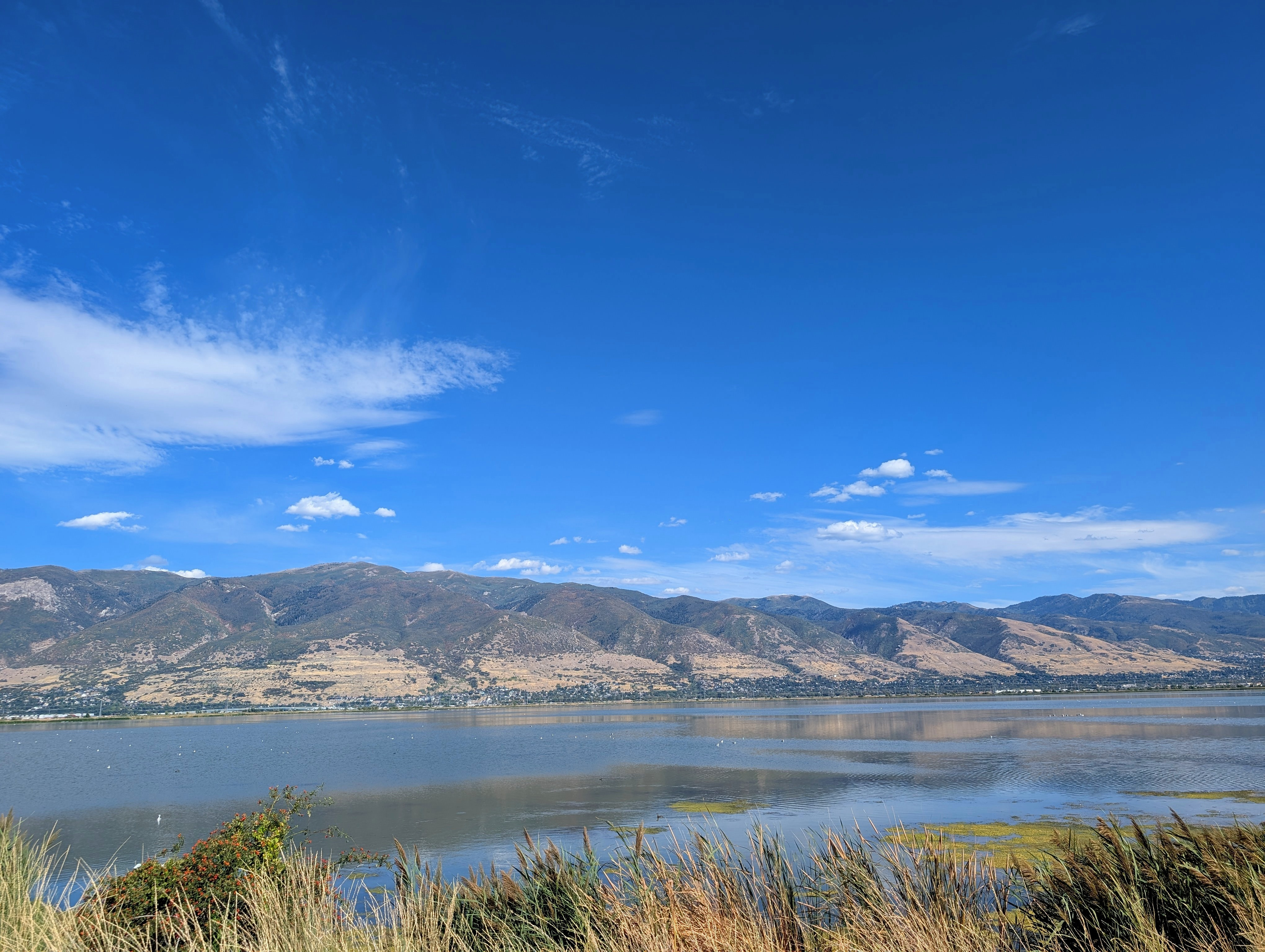
Centerville, Utah, the "Friendly City by the Lake," as viewed from Farmington Bay

The city is situated on a thin strip of land between the Wasatch Mountain Range and Farmington Bay. According to the United States Census Bureau, the city has a total area of 6.0 square miles (16 km^{2}), all land.

=== Climate ===
Centerville's climate features hot, dry summers and cool, snowy winters. Under the Köppen climate classification, Centerville's climate may be described as Mediterranean (Csa) or humid continental (Dsa) depending on which variant of the system is used.

Climate data for Centerville, Utah, USA
Month	Jan	Feb	Mar	Apr	May	Jun	Jul	Aug	Sep	Oct	Nov	Dec	Year
Record high °F (°C)	62 (17)	72 (22)	79 (26)	86 (30)	96 (36)	102 (39)	106 (41)	102 (39)	99 (37)	90 (32)	77 (25)	79 (26)	106 (41)
Mean daily maximum °F (°C)	37.8 (3.2)	43.2 (6.2)	52.3 (11.3)	62.7 (17.1)	72.8 (22.7)	82.4 (28.0)	91.5 (33.1)	89.1 (31.7)	79.1 (26.2)	66.2 (19.0)	50.8 (10.4)	40.1 (4.5)	64.0 (17.8)
Daily mean °F (°C)	28.6 (−1.9)	33.5 (0.8)	41.1 (5.1)	49.8 (9.9)	58.4 (14.7)	66.6 (19.2)	74.9 (23.8)	72.8 (22.7)	63.1 (17.3)	52 (11)	39.6 (4.2)	31.1 (−0.5)	51 (11)
Mean daily minimum °F (°C)	19.1 (−7.2)	23.8 (−4.6)	29.9 (−1.2)	37 (3)	44 (7)	50.8 (10.4)	58.3 (14.6)	56.5 (13.6)	47.1 (8.4)	37.9 (3.3)	28.4 (−2.0)	22.1 (−5.5)	37.9 (3.3)
Record low °F (°C)	−20 (−29)	−20 (−29)	1 (−17)	12 (−11)	26 (−3)	30 (−1)	36 (2)	36 (2)	23 (−5)	16 (−9)	−8 (−22)	−16 (−27)	−20 (−29)
Average precipitation inches (mm)	2.2 (56)	2.1 (53)	2.2 (56)	2.3 (58)	2.2 (56)	1.1 (28)	0.5 (13)	1.1 (28)	1.0 (25)	1.6 (41)	1.8 (46)	1.9 (48)	20 (508)
Average snowfall inches (cm)	19 (48)	11.2 (28)	11.4 (29)	3.2 (8.1)	.5 (1.3)	0 (0)	0 (0)	0 (0)	0 (0)	0.7 (1.8)	5.6 (14)	12.5 (32)	64.1 (162.2)
Average rainy days	9	9	9	8	8	4	3	4	4	5	7	9	79
Average snowy days	5.6	3.3	1.6	.6	0	0	0	0	0	.1	2	4.3	17.5

== Demographics ==
Historical population
Census	Pop.	Note	%±
1860	475		—
1870	544		14.5%
1880	529		−2.8%
1890	532		0.6%
1900	640		20.3%
1910	791		23.6%
1920	787		−0.5%
1930	670		−14.9%
1940	691		3.1%
1950	1,263		82.8%
1960	2,361		86.9%
1970	3,268		38.4%
1980	8,069		146.9%
1990	11,500		42.5%
2000	14,585		26.8%
2010	15,335		5.1%
2020	16,884		10.1%
U.S. Decennial Census

=== 2020 census ===
As of the 2020 census, Centerville had a population of 16,884. The median age was 36.0 years. 28.2% of residents were under the age of 18 and 16.3% of residents were 65 years of age or older. For every 100 females there were 97.6 males, and for every 100 females age 18 and over there were 94.6 males age 18 and over.

99.9% of residents lived in urban areas, while 0.1% lived in rural areas.

There were 5,597 households in Centerville, of which 36.8% had children under the age of 18 living in them. Of all households, 66.2% were married-couple households, 10.8% were households with a male householder and no spouse or partner present, and 20.2% were households with a female householder and no spouse or partner present. About 17.7% of all households were made up of individuals and 8.2% had someone living alone who was 65 years of age or older.

There were 5,757 housing units, of which 2.8% were vacant. The homeowner vacancy rate was 0.4% and the rental vacancy rate was 5.9%.

Racial composition as of the 2020 census
Race	Number	Percent
White	15,041	89.1%
Black or African American	115	0.7%
American Indian and Alaska Native	50	0.3%
Asian	265	1.6%
Native Hawaiian and Other Pacific Islander	114	0.7%
Some other race	356	2.1%
Two or more races	943	5.6%
Hispanic or Latino (of any race)	1,059	6.3%

=== 2000 census ===
As of the 2000 census, there were 14,585 people, 4,138 households, and 3,546 families residing in the city. The population density was 2,415.8 people per square mile (932.7 people/km^{2}). There were 4,280 housing units at an average density of 708.9 units per square mile (273.7 units/km^{2}). The racial makeup of the city was 97.06% White, 0.23% African American, 0.16% Native American, 0.75% Asian, 0.23% Pacific Islander, 0.60% from other races, and 0.97% from two or more races. Hispanic or Latino of any race were 1.95% of the population.

There were 4,138 households, out of which 51.5% had children under the age of 18 living with them, 76.1% were married couples living together, 7.4% had a female householder with no husband present, and 14.3% were non-families. 12.3% of all households were made up of individuals, and 4.8% had someone living alone who was 65 years of age or older. The average household size was 3.52 and the average family size was 3.88.

The population was spread out, with 35.9% under the age of 18, 11.5% from 18 to 24, 25.2% from 25 to 44, 20.4% from 45 to 64, and 7.0% who were 65 years of age or older. The median age was 27 years. For every 100 females, there were 99.0 males. For every 100 females age 18 and over, there were 94.6 males.

The median income for a household in the city was $64,818, and the median income for a family was $70,855. Males had a median income of $50,033 versus $26,527 for females. The per capita income for the city was $19,666. About 1.4% of families and 2.0% of the population were below the poverty line, including 2.2% of those under age 18 and 1.7% of those age 65 or over.

== Economy ==
One of the most heavily traveled areas of Davis County, Utah, Parrish Lane, runs through Centerville. The highway was established in 1965 as a connector from I-15 to SR-106 in Centerville. It remained essentially unchanged until it was extended westward to connect to the newly constructed Legacy Parkway in 2008.

In 2017 the highway thoroughfare, Parrish Lane section, is home to the commercial district of Centerville. Major businesses include big box retailers and several smaller retail businesses and restaurants. In addition, several small independent professional businesses line the street. Parrish Lane connects with Centerville's main street where several other businesses operate including dentists, physicians, chiropractors and others.

In addition, several professional businesses including real estate, insurance and service-based businesses are located here.

== Education ==
Centerville maintains five public schools in the city. The nearest high school is Viewmont High School, located south of Centerville in the city of Bountiful. There are four elementary schools: Jennie P. Stewart, J.A. Taylor, Reading, and Centerville. There is one Junior High, a 7–9 school called Centerville Junior High.

== Gallery ==
Sites listed on the National Register of Historic Places.

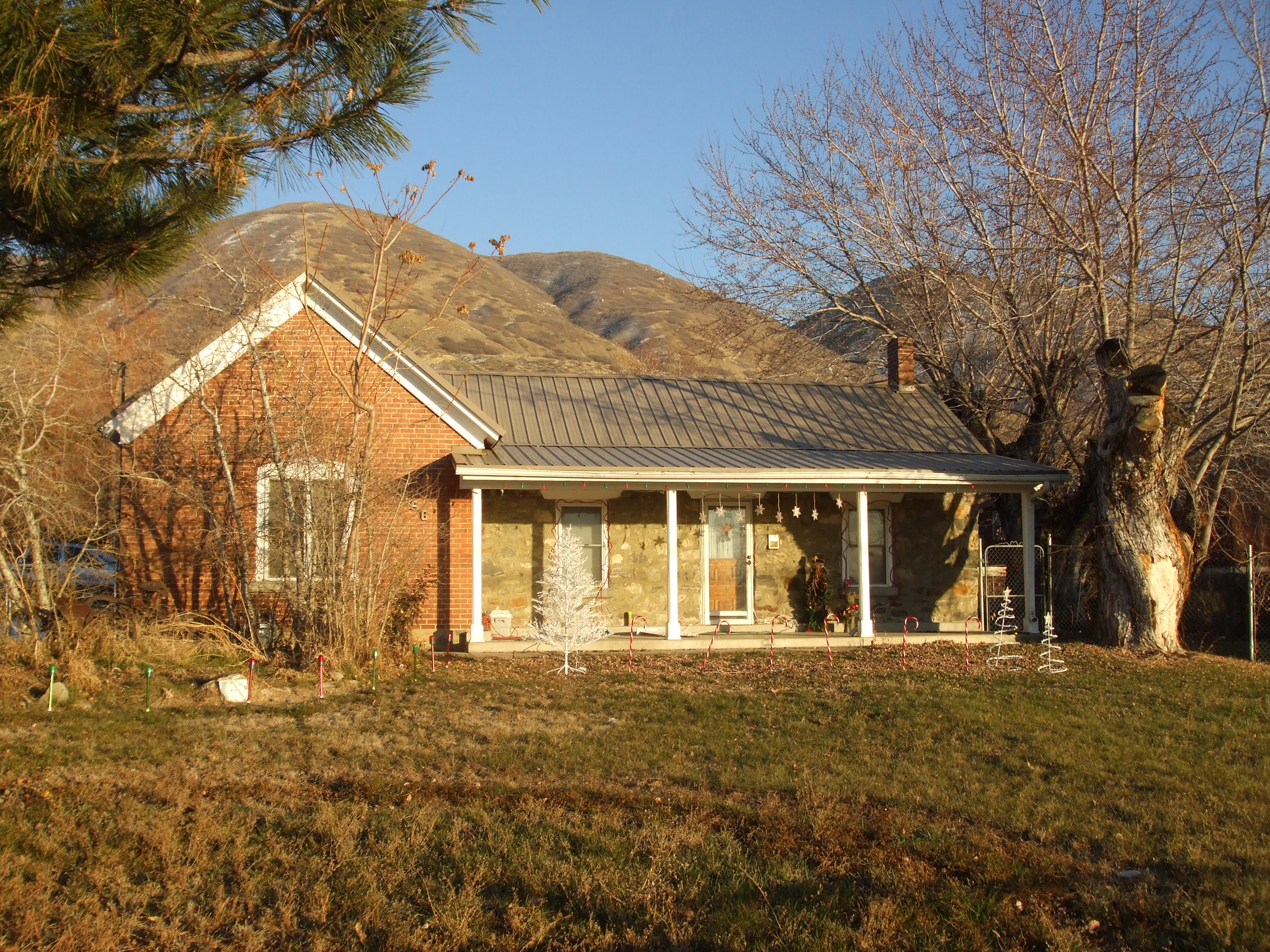
Barnard-Garn-Barber House

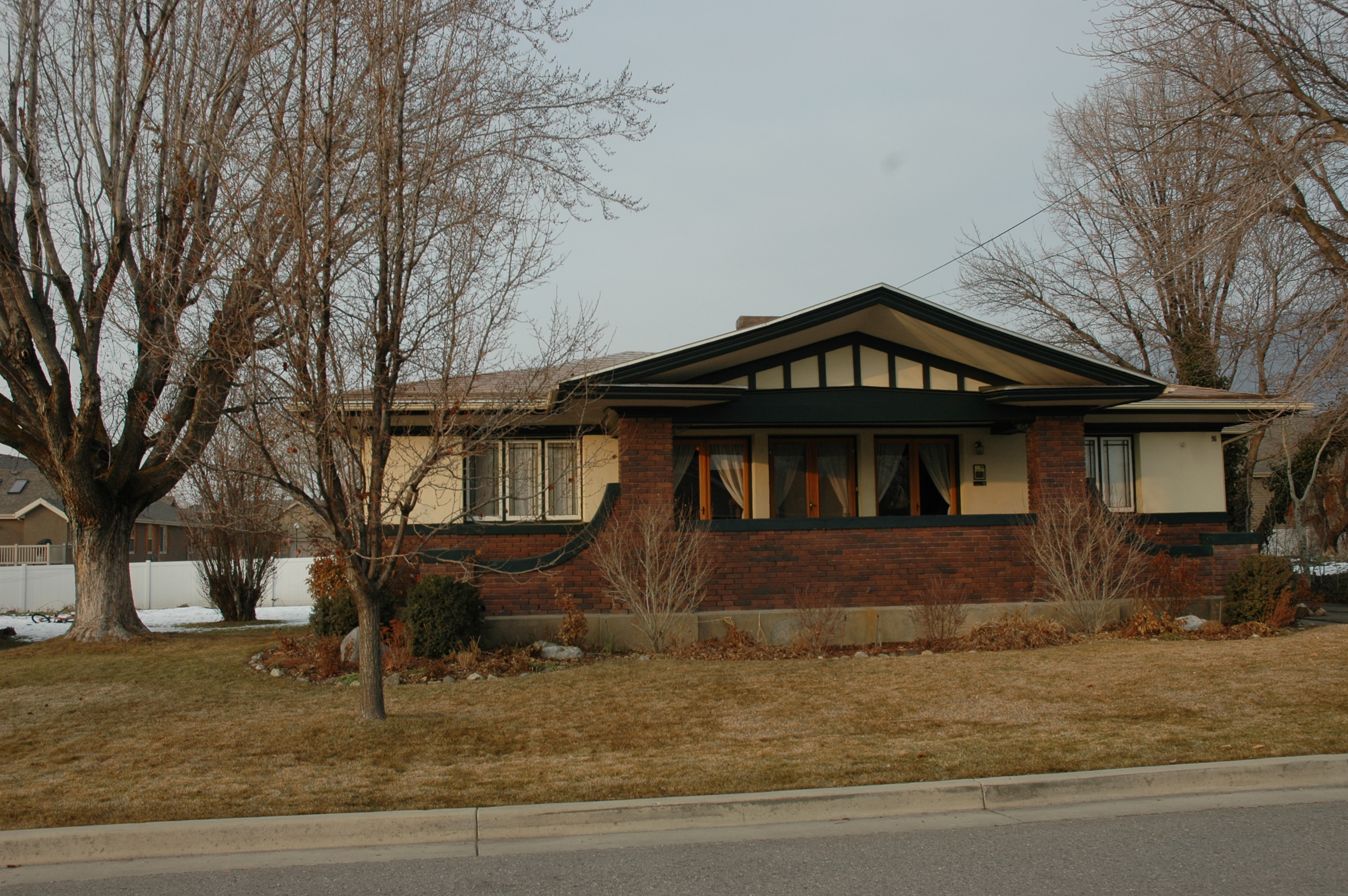
Franklin and Amelia Walton House

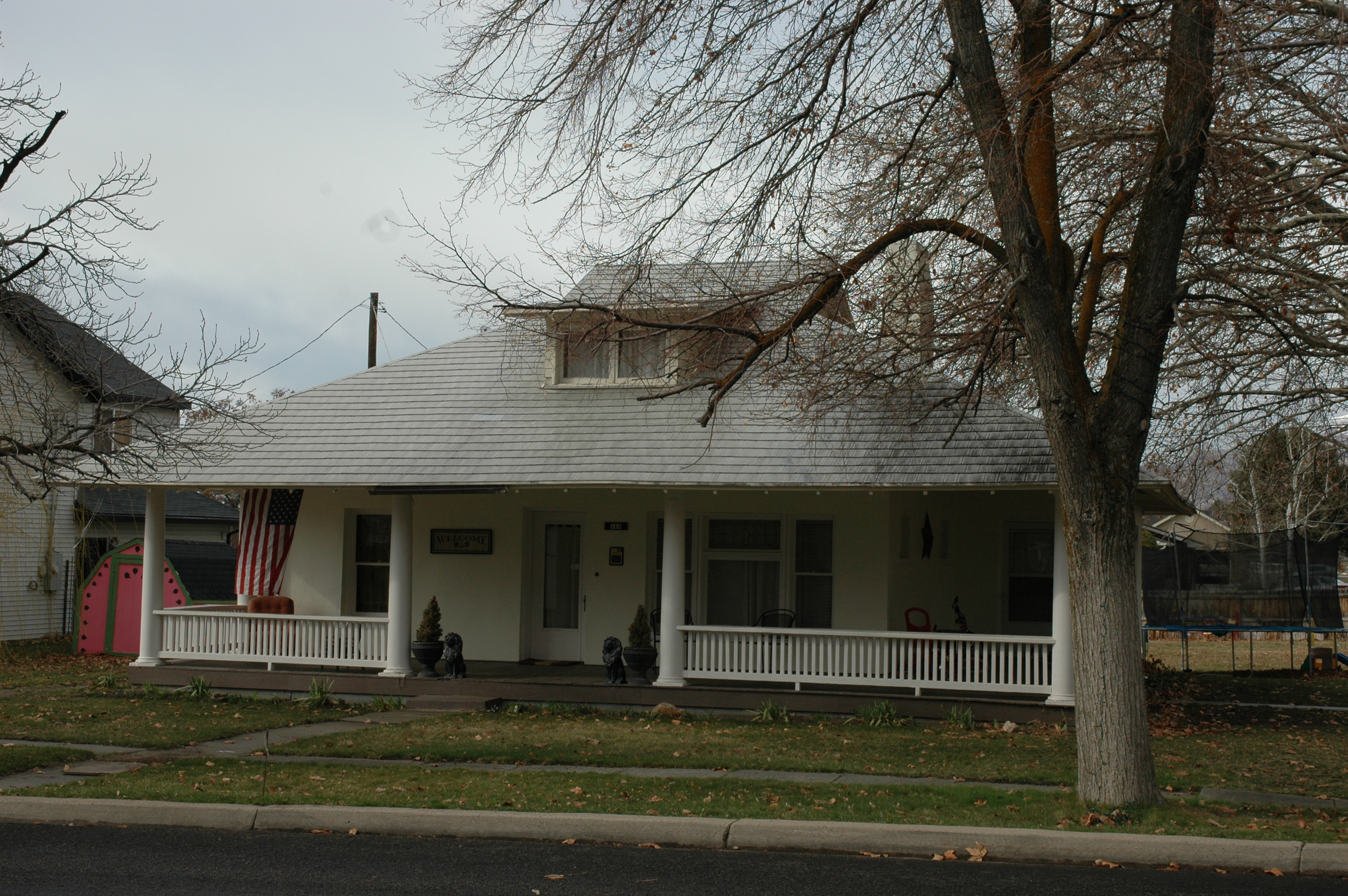
Thomas and Margaret Brandon House

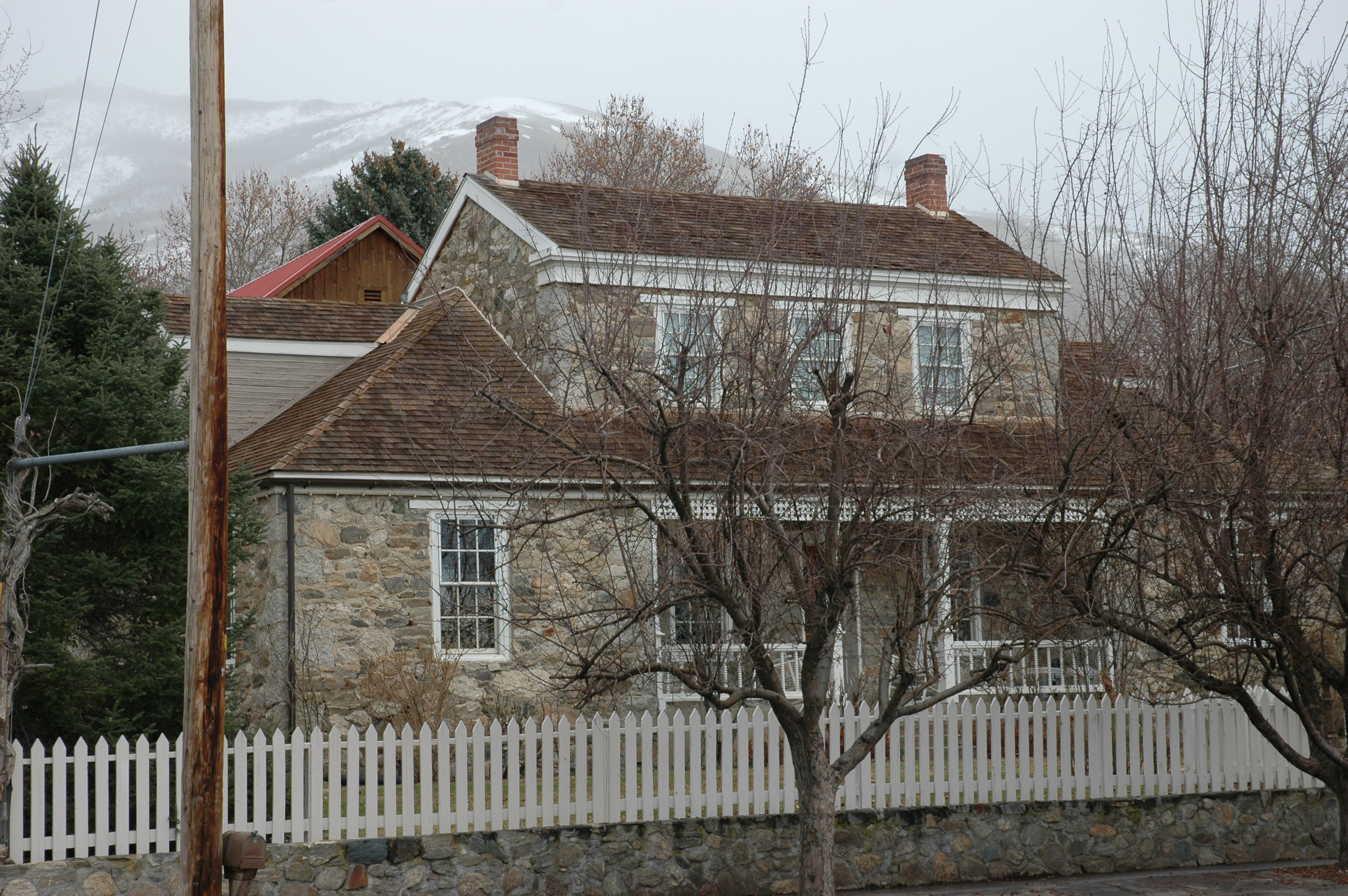
William Capener House

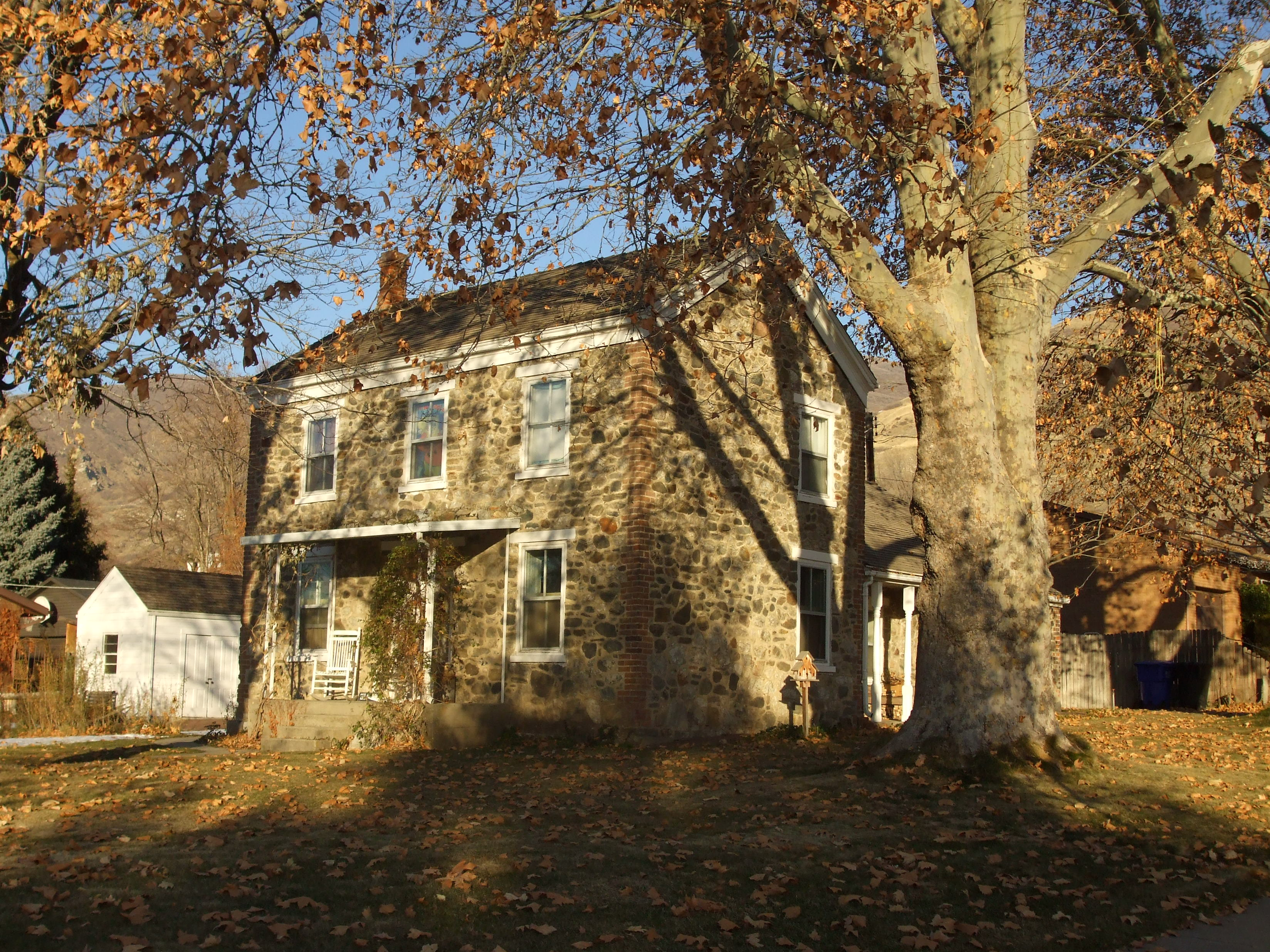
Osmyn and Emily Deuel House

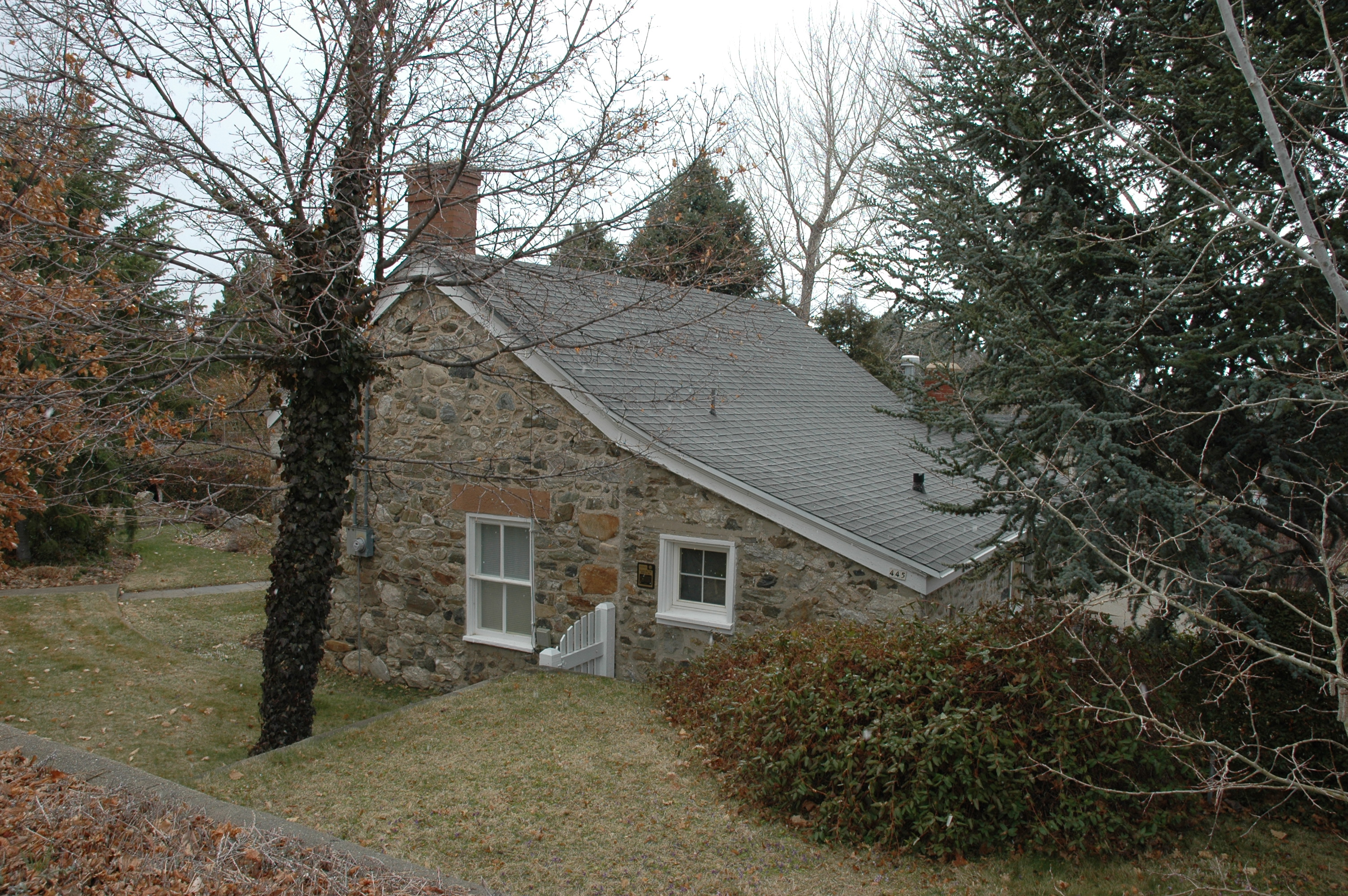
John, Harriet, and Eliza Jennett Duncan House

== See also ==
- List of cities and towns in Utah
