= Warren B. Wilson =

American painter (1920–1997)

Warren Bingham Wilson
- Born: November 4, 1920; Farmington, Utah, U.S.
- Died: December 1, 1997 (aged 77)
- Resting place: Provo City Cemetery
- Education: Utah State University (BA); University of Iowa (MFA)
- Occupations: Educator, painter, sculptor, potter
- Spouse: Donna Myrl Van Wagenen
- Children: 7

Warren Bingham Wilson (November 4, 1920 – December 1, 1997) was an American educator, painter, sculptor, and potter. He was a professor of art at Brigham Young University for nearly three decades.

== Life and career ==
Wilson was born in Farmington, Utah. He graduated from Utah State University in 1943, served in the United States Air Force during World War II from 1943 to 1945, and earned a master's degree in Fine Arts from the University of Iowa in 1949.

Wilson first taught art at his alma mater, Utah State University, for 5 years. He subsequently joined the faculty at Brigham Young University, where he taught for 29 years. Wilson was also a painter, sculptor, and potter.

Wilson married Donna Myrl Van Wagenen, and they had seven children. A member of the Church of Jesus Christ of Latter-day Saints, he served as a missionary in Nauvoo, Illinois with his wife in 1985. Wilson died on December 1, 1997, at the age of 77. He was buried at the Provo City Cemetery.
