= Esther Weisbrodt Francis =

American midwife and musician

Esther Charlotte Emily Weisbrodt Francis (June 24, 1836 – February 21, 1913) was an American midwife and musician, and 19th-century member of the Church of Jesus Christ of Latter-day Saints.

== Early life ==
Esther Charlotte Emily Weisbrodt was born in Turin, Italy, and was a daughter of Samuel David Weisbrodt and Emily Weisbrodt. Of German descent, her parents moved from Saxony to Italy to work as an attendant to the German Consulate. This gave privileges for special schooling and training. She achieved equivalent to a Junior College education and taught in a school for women in Italy. She spoke and wrote four languages (German, French, Italian, and English). She was also an expert mathematician and talented musician.

== Conversion and marriage ==
Weisbrodt was converted and baptized into the Church of Jesus Christ of Latter-day Saints (LDS Church) by Samuel Francis, a Mormon missionary in Italy. Soon after joining the church, she was forced by persecution to leave Turin, and went to Geneva, Switzerland, then the headquarters of the Swiss Mission. There she again met Samuel Francis, to whom she was married on 1 July 1857 by the English consul. About a year after their marriage they left for England and remained there from 1858 to 1861, her husband continuing in missionary work.

== Move to the United States ==
In May 1861, Francis with her husband and two small children, Samuel and Joseph, migrated to the United States from England, crossing the plains, arriving in Salt Lake City that September. In 1863, the family moved to Morgan, Utah Territory, where she endured the hardships of early pioneer life, along with bearing and raising ten children.

Always active in community life, Francis served as midwife, and taught mathematics, language, and music in the first school in Morgan. The public service she rendered was unique for a pioneer woman — translating mail for neighbors, also acting as interpreter for the court. Her knowledge of mathematics and calculus drew many to seek her help in figuring the tons of hay in a stack, bushels of grain in a bin, or acres of land on their farm. She assisted early surveyors by calculating the proper acreage per lot or section—she also participated in the surveying and laying out of Morgan into blocks, lots and streets. For these outstanding achievements a mountain peak was named in her honor.

== Francis Peak ==
Rising above Morgan Valley to the west of the Wasatch Mountains, one of its highest peaks bears the name "Francis Peak". Snow-capped and glittering in the sun in the day and lit by two artificial lights by night, it stands as a lighthouse in the sky to be seen for many miles. It serves as a radar station operated by the National Guard to guide air traffic in the Great Basin region.

Mounted prominently on a wall in the station's main building is a plaque with a picture of Esther C. E. Francis coupled with this inscription:

"History and local tradition during the past century verifies that Francis Peak was named in honor of Esther Charlotte Emily Weisbrodt Francis, an early pioneer woman of Morgan, Utah".

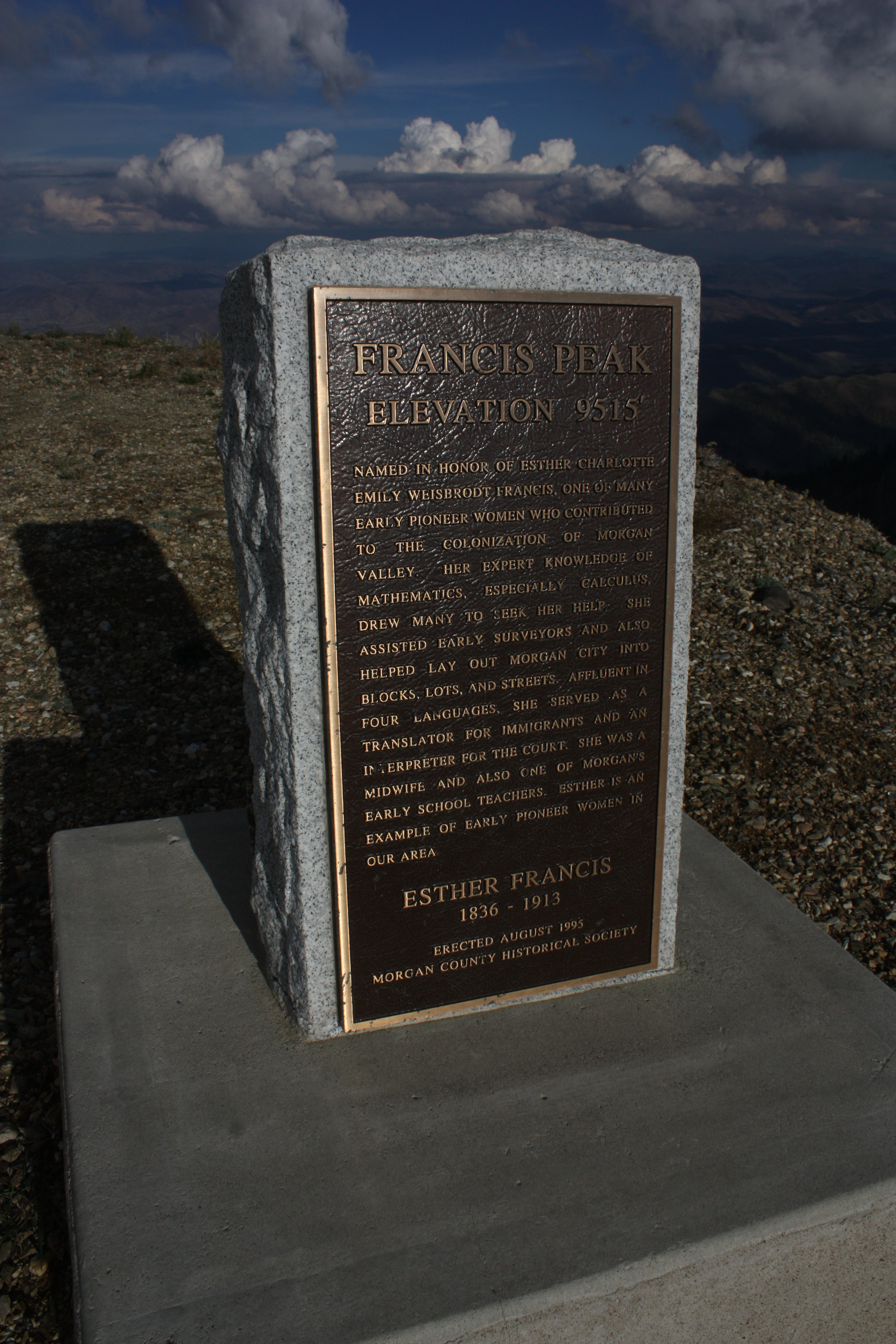
Francis Peak Historic Marker

In 1995 the Morgan County Historical Society mounted a granite and bronze marker just outside the UANG radar station which reads

"FRANCIS PEAK Elevation 9515' Named in honor of Esther Charlotte Emily Weisbrodt Francis. One of many early pioneer women who contributed to the colonization of Morgan Valley. Her expert knowledge of mathematics, especially calculus, drew many to seek her help. She assisted early surveyors and also helped lay out Morgan City into blocks, lots, and streets. Affluent (sic) in four languages, she served as a translator for immigrants and an interpreter for the court. She was a midwife and also one of Morgan's early school teachers. Esther is an example of early pioneer women in our area. ESTHER FRANCIS 1836 - 1913".

== Death ==
At age 77, Francis died at her home in Morgan, Utah, and was buried in the local cemetery.

== Legacy ==
In addition to Francis Peak, Francis Peak Park in Ogden, Utah is named after her.
