= Farmington, Utah =

City in Utah, United States

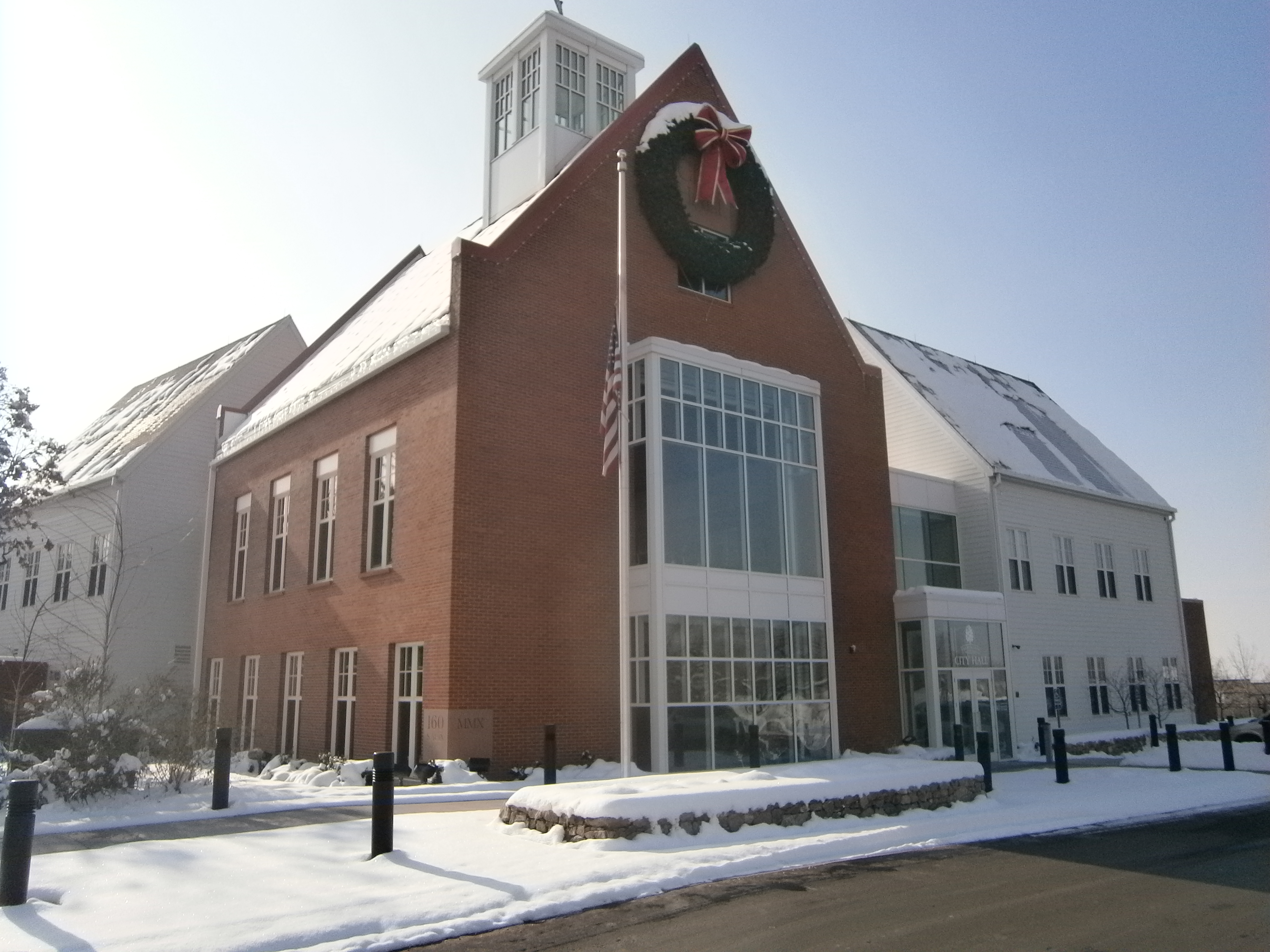
- City hall

- Location in Davis County and the state of Utah
- Coordinates: 40°59′12″N 111°53′57″W
- Country: United States
- State: Utah
- County: Davis
- Settled: 1847
- Incorporated: February 18, 1852
- Founder: Hector Caleb Haight
- Named for: Farming

Area
  - Total: 10.05 sq mi (26.02 km^{2})
  - Land: 9.95 sq mi (25.78 km^{2})
  - Water: 0.093 sq mi (0.24 km^{2})
- Elevation: 4,246 ft (1,294 m)

Population (2020)
  - Total: 24,531
  - Density: 2,465/sq mi (951.6/km^{2})
- Time zone: UTC−7 (Mountain (MST))
  - Summer (DST): UTC−6 (MDT)
- ZIP code: 84025
- Area codes: 385, 801
- FIPS code: 49-24740
- GNIS feature ID: 2410488
- Website: www.farmington.utah.gov

Farmington is a city in and the county seat of Davis County, Utah, United States. The population was 24,531 at the 2020 census. The Lagoon Amusement Park and Station Park transit-oriented retail center (which includes a FrontRunner train station) are located in Farmington.

== History ==
The region that is now Farmington was settled in 1847 by the Haight family, a Mormon pioneer family that established a farm and an inn. Five more pioneering families migrated to this region in the autumn of 1849. The region developed into an undefined community originally called North Cottonwood Settlement. In 1852, the territorial legislature picked North Cottonwood as the county seat and officially named it Farmington. Following orders from Daniel H. Wells and Brigham Young, Farmington residents built a wall around the city in 1853 under the direction of Major Thomas S. Smith. This walled townsite became known as "the Fort". Early church meetings were held in a log school and then an adobe structure. The county courthouse was used for religious meetings from 1855 to 1863. The city's ward moved back to the schoolhouse, and the first meetinghouse was dedicated in January 1864. By the early 1860s, the town of Farmington stretched for six miles between Centerville and Kaysville.

The Children's Primary Association of the Church of Jesus Christ of Latter-day Saints was organized here on August 11, 1878. It was the birthplace of one of the longest-lived Latter-day Saint apostles, LeGrand Richards. His maternal great-grandfather, Joseph Lee Robinson, was the first bishop of what was then the North Cottonwood Ward. Lagoon Amusement Park was founded here in 1886 and occupies 100 acres (0.40 km^{2}) of the city. Ezra T. Clark was an early settler of Farmington who later founded the Davis County Bank and built several houses in the area, some of which are located in the Clark Lane Historic District, listed on the National Register of Historic Places.

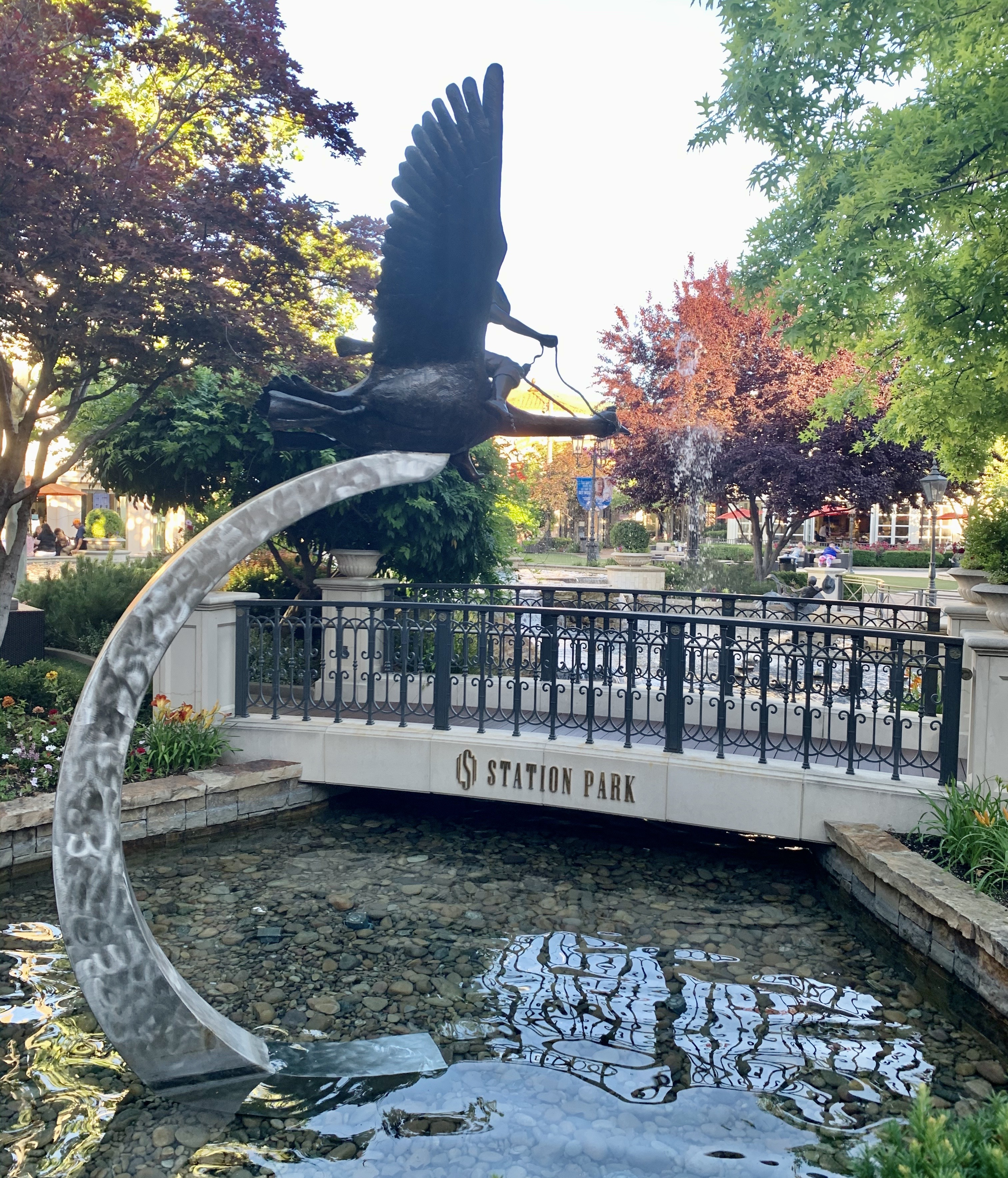
Water feature at Station Park in Farmington

== Geography ==
Farmington is located in east-central Davis County. It is bordered by Kaysville and Fruit Heights to the north and by Centerville to the south. The Wasatch Mountains are to the east, and the Great Salt Lake is to the west. According to the United States Census Bureau, the city has a total area of 10.0 square miles (25.8 km^{2}), of which 9.8 square miles (25.5 km^{2}) is land and 0.1 square miles (0.2 km^{2}), or 0.96%, is water.

=== Climate ===
Lake-enhanced snowfall occurs frequently during the winter, and cool downslope mountain breezes occur on most summer evenings. Under the Köppen climate classification, Farmington experiences what may be classified as a hot-summer Mediterranean climate (Csa), despite not being on the west coast of an ocean like most Mediterranean climates. It may also be classified as humid continental (Dsa), if the boundary between continental and subtropical climate is an average January temperature of 0 °C (32 °F) rather than −3 °C (27 °F).

Climate data for Farmington, Utah (1981–2010)
Month	Jan	Feb	Mar	Apr	May	Jun	Jul	Aug	Sep	Oct	Nov	Dec	Year
Mean daily maximum °F (°C)	38.1 (3.4)	43.7 (6.5)	54.3 (12.4)	62.8 (17.1)	73.2 (22.9)	83.6 (28.7)	92.5 (33.6)	90.5 (32.5)	80.0 (26.7)	66.1 (18.9)	50.3 (10.2)	39.3 (4.1)	64.5 (18.1)
Mean daily minimum °F (°C)	20.6 (−6.3)	24.8 (−4.0)	32.3 (0.2)	39.0 (3.9)	46.7 (8.2)	54.7 (12.6)	61.9 (16.6)	60.5 (15.8)	51.0 (10.6)	40.0 (4.4)	30.4 (−0.9)	22.7 (−5.2)	40.5 (4.7)
Average precipitation inches (mm)	1.99 (51)	2.01 (51)	2.50 (64)	2.44 (62)	2.65 (67)	1.45 (37)	0.80 (20)	0.69 (18)	1.52 (39)	2.12 (54)	2.10 (53)	1.97 (50)	22.25 (565)
Average snowfall inches (cm)	13.8 (35)	11.0 (28)	3.8 (9.7)	1.3 (3.3)	0.0 (0.0)	0.0 (0.0)	0.0 (0.0)	0.0 (0.0)	0.0 (0.0)	0.3 (0.76)	5.7 (14)	12.7 (32)	48.6 (123)
Source: NOAA

== Demographics ==
Historical population
Census	Pop.	Note	%±
1860	591		—
1870	976		65.1%
1880	1,073		9.9%
1890	1,036		−3.4%
1900	1,050		1.4%
1910	1,280		21.9%
1920	1,170		−8.6%
1930	1,339		14.4%
1940	1,211		−9.6%
1950	1,468		21.2%
1960	1,951		32.9%
1970	2,526		29.5%
1980	4,691		85.7%
1990	9,028		92.5%
2000	12,081		33.8%
2010	18,275		51.3%
2020	24,531		34.2%
2023 (est.)	25,771		5.1%
U.S. Decennial Census

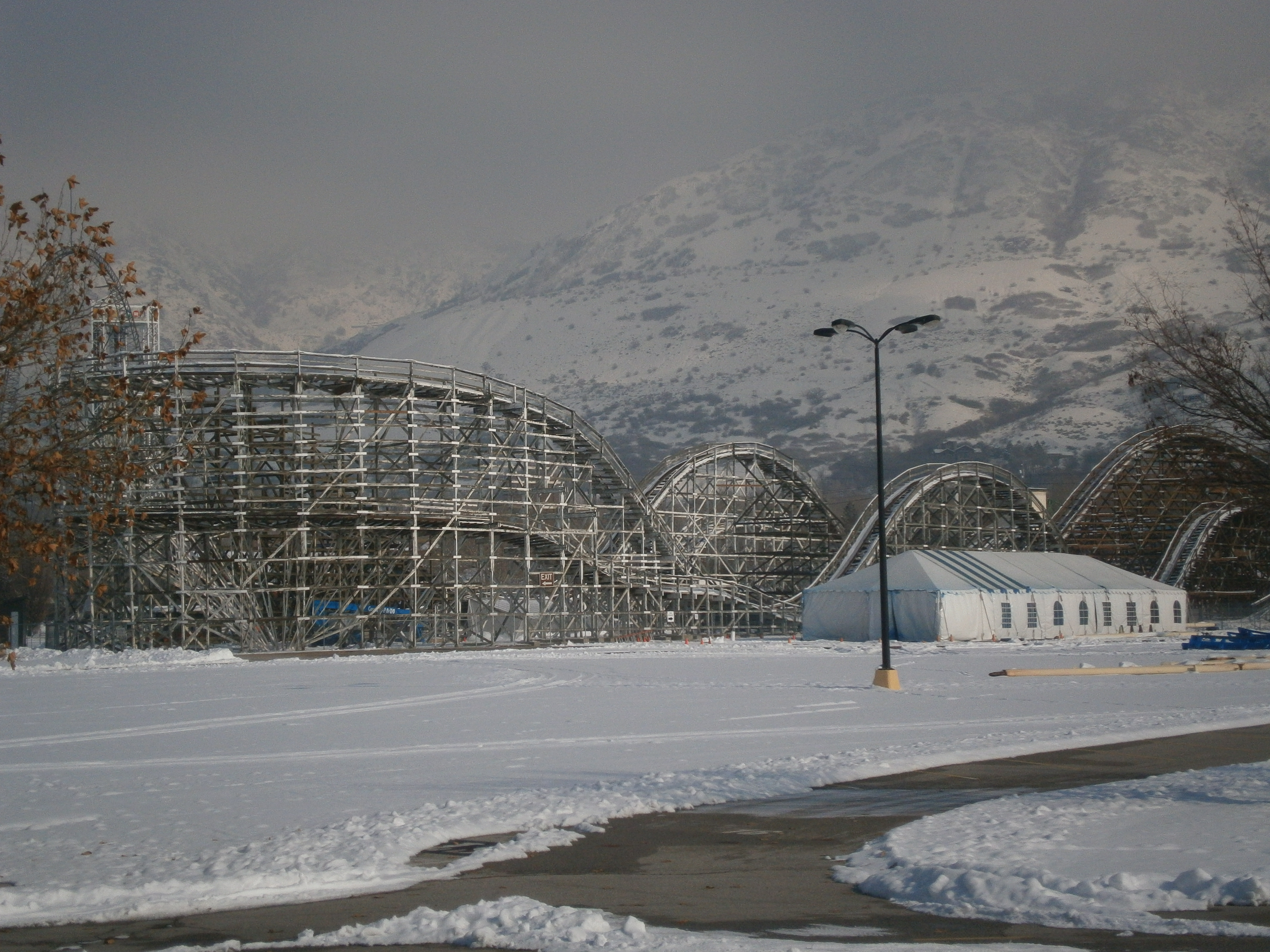
The Lagoon Roller Coaster, January 2013

Farmington is part of the Ogden-Clearfield metropolitan area. In an 1850 census of Davis County, almost half of the Farmington residents were from New York.

=== 2020 census ===
As of the 2020 census, Farmington had a population of 24,531 and a population density of 2,465.3 people per square mile (951.8/km^{2}).

Among non-Hispanic or Latino people, the racial makeup was 21,723 (88.6%) White, 166 (0.7%) African American, 58 (0.2%) Native American, 350 (1.4%) Asian, 71 (0.3%) Pacific Islander, 47 (0.2%) from other races, and 780 (3.2%) from two or more races. 1,336 (5.4%) people were Hispanic or Latino.

There were 12,255 (49.96%) males and 12,276 (50.04%) females, and the population distribution by age was 8,528 (34.8%) under the age of 18, 13,530 (55.2%) from 18 to 64, and 2,473 (10.1%) who were at least 65 years old. The median age was 31.7 years. For every 100 females there were 99.8 males, and for every 100 females age 18 and over there were 99.6 males age 18 and over.

There were 7,150 households in Farmington, of which 47.9% had children under the age of 18 living in them. Of all households, 70.3% were married couples, 10.9% were households with a male householder and no spouse or partner present, and 16.4% were households with a female householder and no spouse or partner present. About 15.7% of all households were a single person living alone and 5.4% had someone living alone who was 65 years of age or older. The average household size was 3.43, 5,799 (81.1%) were families and 1,351 (18.9%) were non-families. Among all families, 5,030 (70.3%) were married couples, 234 (3.3%) were male householders with no spouse, and 535 (7.5%) were female householders with no spouse. Among all non-families, 1,124 (15.7%) were a single person living alone and 227 (3.2%) were two or more people living together. 5,651 (79.0%) of households were owner-occupied while 1,499 (21.0%) were renter-occupied.

There were 7,367 housing units, of which 2.9% were vacant. The homeowner vacancy rate was 0.4% and the rental vacancy rate was 5.5%.

97.8% of residents lived in urban areas, while 2.2% lived in rural areas.

Racial composition as of the 2020 census
Race	Number	Percent
White	22,066	90.0%
Black or African American	173	0.7%
American Indian and Alaska Native	83	0.3%
Asian	357	1.5%
Native Hawaiian and Other Pacific Islander	78	0.3%
Some other race	368	1.5%
Two or more races	1,406	5.7%
Hispanic or Latino (of any race)	1,336	5.4%

=== American Community Survey ===
The median income for a Farmington household was $99,208 and the median family income was $111,116, with a per-capita income of $34,781. The median income for males that were full-time employees was $81,027 and for females $54,635. 3.5% of the population and 2.7% of families were below the poverty line.

In terms of education attainment, out of the 13,637 people in Farmington 25 years or older, 309 (2.3%) had not completed high school, 2,008 (14.7%) had a high school diploma or equivalency, 4,757 (34.9%) had some college or associate degree, 4,267 (31.3%) had a bachelor's degree, and 2,296 (16.8%) had a graduate or professional degree.

== Arts and culture ==
The S&S Shortline Railroad Park and Museum, located in the Farmington area, contains over 90 pieces of railroad equipment in all shapes and sizes. It also has two separate railroads where visitors can enjoy train rides on the first Saturday of every month from June to September. The track gauges of the two railroads are 2 ft (610 mm) narrow gauge and 7 1/2 in (190.5 mm) gauge. One interesting item in the museum's collection is a 2 ft (610 mm) gauge, oil-powered, 4-4-0 steam locomotive built by Crown Metal Products.

== Parks and recreation ==
The Farmington Trail Committee maintains 146.49 miles of trail throughout the city. 36 of the trails are named that traverse from the hills on the east to the wetlands to the west. The trail system has a variety of surface material including gravel, asphalt, and concrete. There are 55 points of interest that are accessible by the trail system.

== Education ==
The community is served by Davis School District.

== Notable people ==
- Henry McBride, fourth governor of Washington
- LeGrand Richards, religious leader
- Bruce Summerhays, Champions Tour golfer
- Daniel Summerhays, PGA Tour golfer
- Obert C. Tanner founder of O.C. Tanner Co.
- Warren Bingham Wilson (1920–1997) educator, visual artist

== See also ==
- List of cities and towns in Utah
- Francis Peak
