= Station Park (Farmington, Utah) =

- Location: Farmington, Utah, United States
- Coordinates: 40°59′07″N 111°54′25″W
- Address: 140 N Union Ave.
- Opened: 2011
- Developer: CenterCal Properties LLC
- Num. of stores: 140+
- Website: shopatstationpark.com

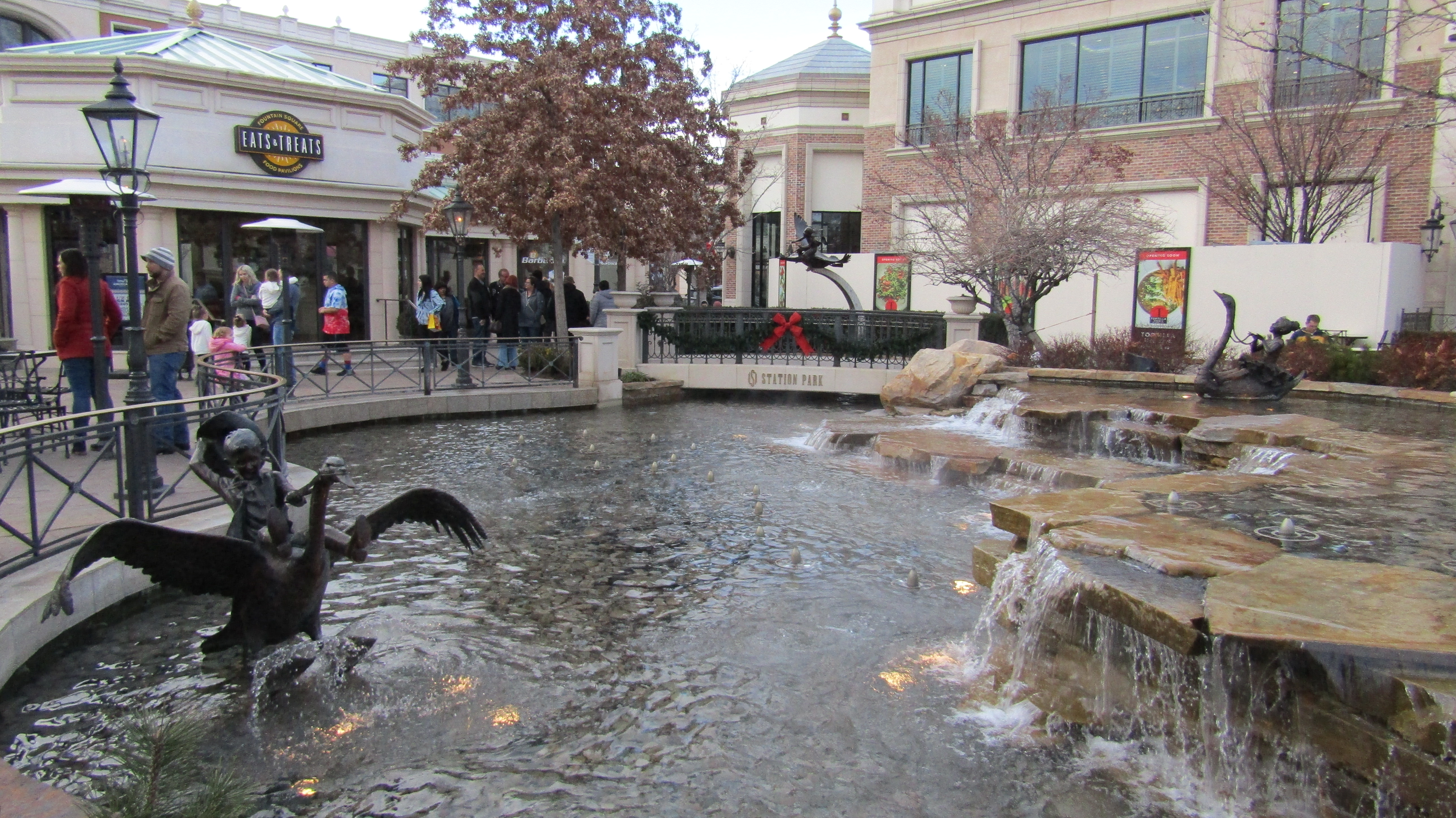
Station Park fountain

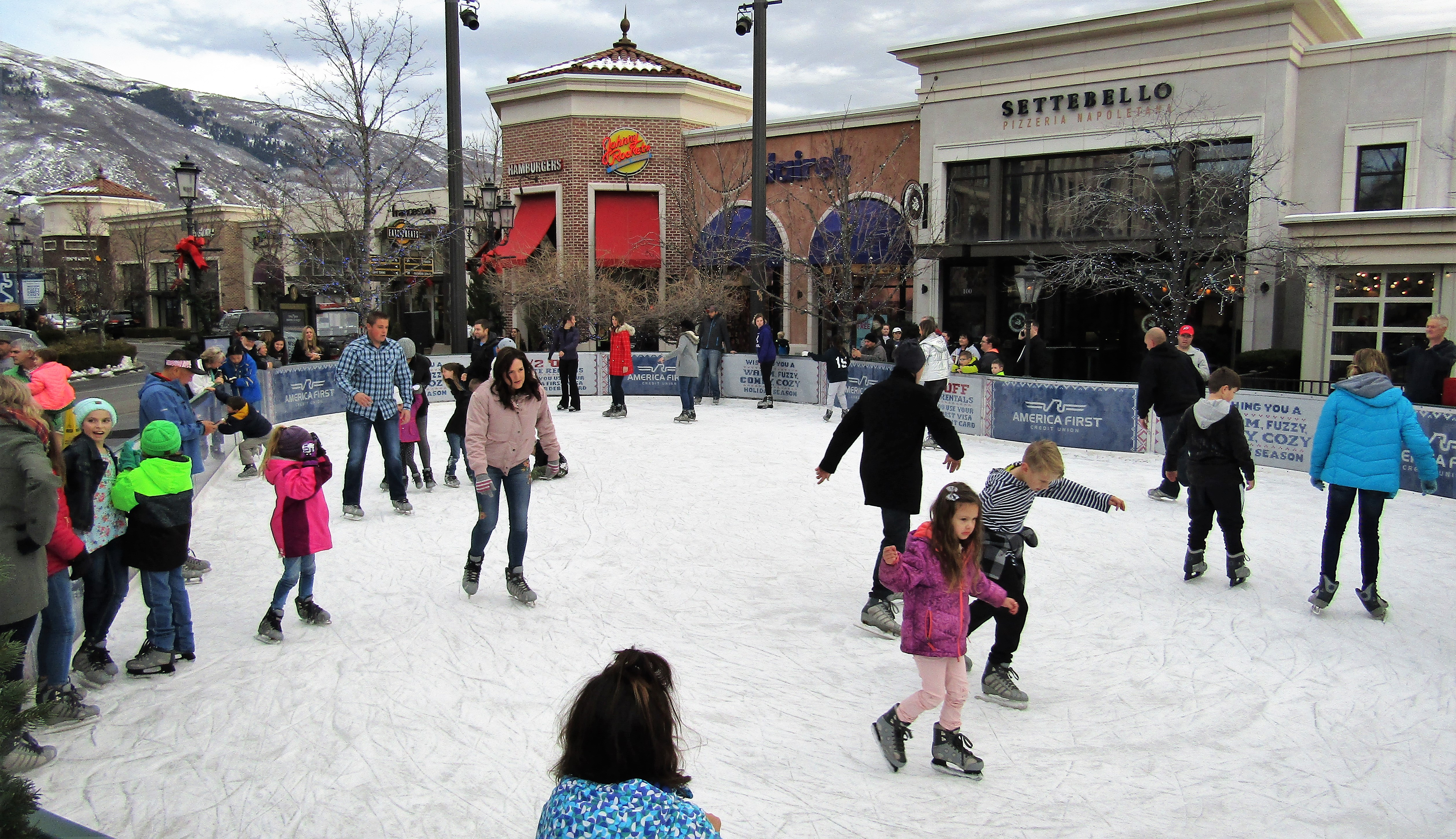
Skating at Station Park

Station Park is a transit-oriented development located in Farmington, Utah, United States. It borders the Farmington FrontRunner station. CenterCal Properties developed and currently maintains Station Park. Amenities include approximately 100 stores, a fountain that is synchronized to music and lights, an ice skating rink, a Hyatt Place hotel and a Cinemark theatre.

== History ==
Haws Companies began to buy land for Station Park in 1996. Then they worked with Farmington city from 2000–2006 to develop the land before selling it to CenterCal Properties in 2007. Development of Station Park began in 2008. Station Park opened in 2011.

In 2013 Haws Companies filed a lawsuit against Farmington city citing discrimination against Haws Companies and failure to follow through on previous agreements. In 2014 Haws Companies dropped the suit against Farmington city.

== Anchors and major stores ==
- Apple Store
- Barnes & Noble
- Best Buy
- Cinemark Theatres
- Cost Plus World Market
- H&M
- Harmons
- Marshalls
- Nike Factory Store
- Nordstrom Rack
- Old Navy
- REI
- Ross Dress For Less

== Former anchors ==
- Gordmans - now Best Buy as of October 2018.
- Sports Authority - now REI and Nike Factory Store as of October 2020.
