= Barnes House =

Barnes House may refer to:

in England

- Andrew Barnes House, Norham

in the United States

(by state, then city)

- Barnes-Peery House, Golden, Colorado, listed on the National Register of Historic Places (NRHP)
- Selah Barnes House, Southington, Connecticut, listed on the NRHP in Connecticut
- Barnes-Frost House, Southington, Connecticut, NRHP-listed
- House at 3764 Ponce de Leon Avenue, Jacksonville, Florida, also known as the Barnes House, NRHP-listed
- Tom Barnes Barn, Jerome, Idaho, NRHP-listed
- Henry J. Barnes House, Mt. Washington, Kentucky, listed on the NRHP in Kentucky
- Spofford-Barnes House, Boxford, Massachusetts, NRHP-listed
- James B. Barnes House, Cambridge, Massachusetts, NRHP-listed
- Walter S. and Melissa E. Barnes House, Somerville, Massachusetts, NRHP-listed
- Barnes House (Quincy, Massachusetts), NRHP-listed
- Jonathan Barnes House, Hillsborough Center, New Hampshire, NRHP-listed
- Barnes-Hiscock House, Syracuse, New York, NRHP-listed
- Gen. Joshua Barnes House, Wilson, North Carolina, listed on the NRHP in North Carolina
- Barnes-Hooks Farm, Fremont, North Carolina, listed on the NRHP in North Carolina
- David A. Barnes House, Murfreesboro, North Carolina, listed on the NRHP in Hertford County, North Carolina
- Barnes-Steverson House, Idabel, Oklahoma, listed on the NRHP in Oklahoma
- Frank C. Barnes House, Portland, Oregon, NRHP-listed
- W. C. Barnes House, Victoria, Texas, listed on the NRHP in Texas
- Charles W. Barnes House, Austin, Texas, listed on the NRHP in Texas
- Barnes-Laird House, San Antonio, Texas, Listed on the NRHP in Texas
- John George Moroni Barnes House, Kaysville, Utah, NRHP-listed
- John R. Barnes House, Kaysville, Utah, NRHP-listed
- Charles Barnes House, Park City, Utah, listed on the NRHP in Utah
- Andrew Barnes House, Menomonee Falls, Wisconsin, listed on the NRHP in Wisconsin
- Barnes-Wellford House, Charleston, West Virginia, NRHP-listed
