= Joseph Adams House (Layton, Utah) =

Historic house in Utah, United States

- U.S. National Register of Historic Places
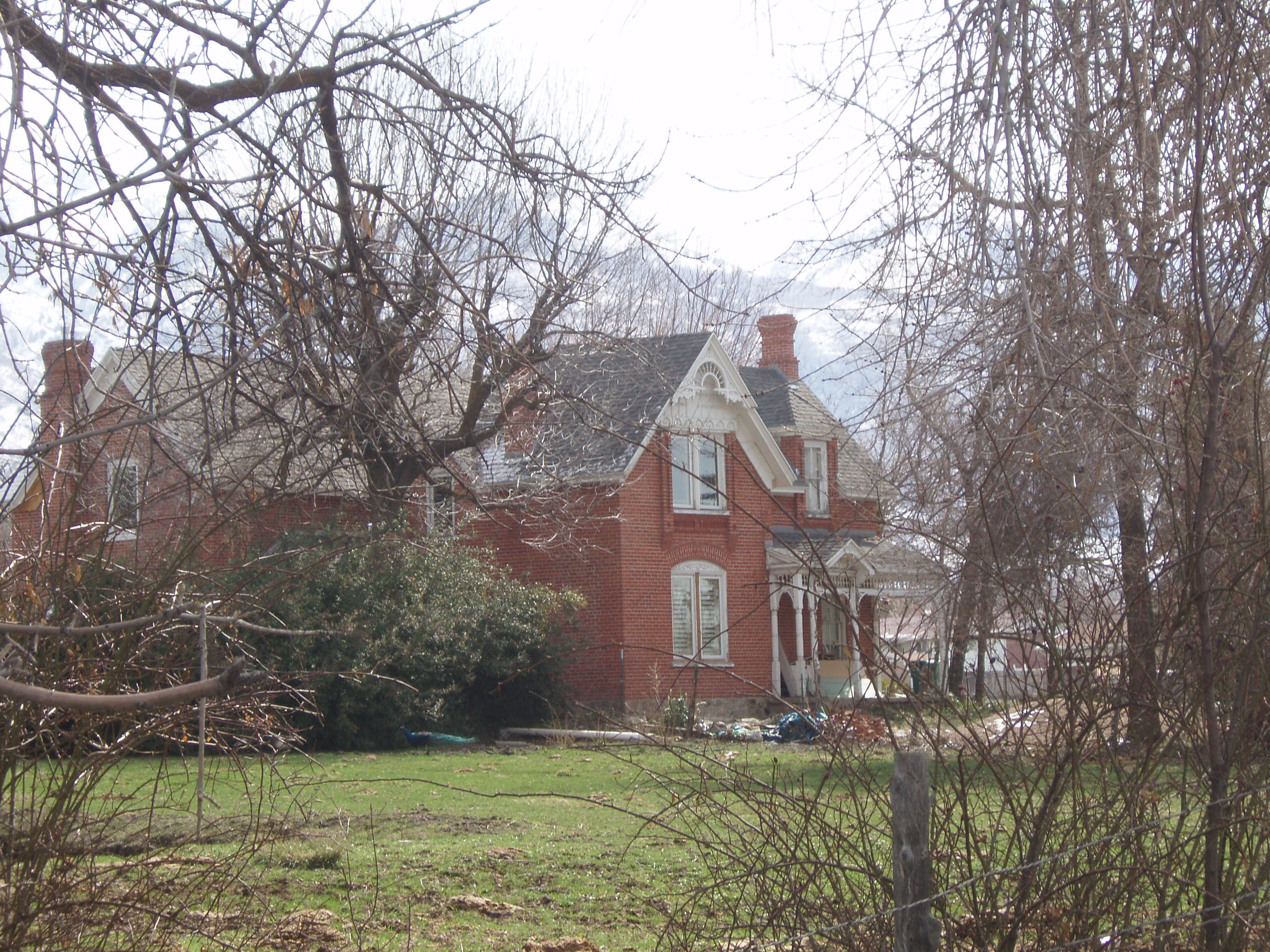

- Location within Utah Location within the United States
- Location: 300 N. Adamswood Rd., Layton, Utah
- Coordinates: 41°3′55″N 111°56′42″W
- Area: 6 acres (2.4 ha)
- Built: 1889-90
- Built by: Adams, Joseph
- Architectural style: Queen Anne, T-Form
- NRHP reference No.: 78002655
- Added to NRHP: February 17, 1978

The Joseph Adams House is a historic house located at 300 North Adamswood Road in Layton, Utah.

== Description and history ==
Constructed in 1889–1890, the two-story farmhouse was designed in the Queen Anne style.

Still set among trees and pastureland, it is significant as one of the few farmhouses remaining from around the turn of the 20th century, when Davis County was rural and agricultural.

It was possibly designed by Kaysville, Utah architect William Allen and would thereby be related to the John Henry Layton House in West Layton and to the George W. Layton House, which is the most ornate of the three.

It was listed on the National Register of Historic Places on February 17, 1978.
