= Henry Blood House =

Historic house in Utah, United States

- U.S. National Register of Historic Places
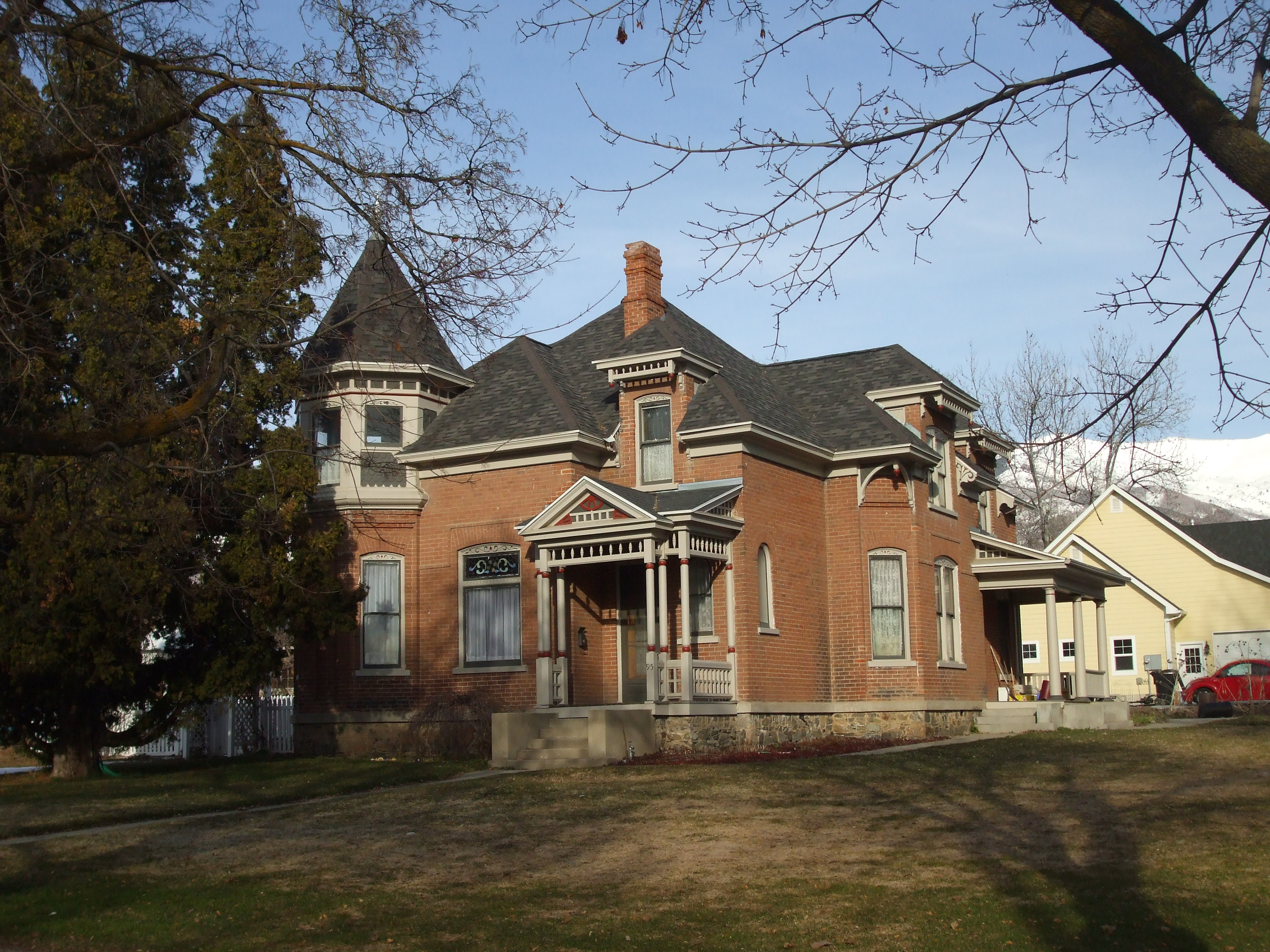
- Henry Blood House, March 2009

- Location within Utah Location within the United States
- Location: 95 South 300 West; Kaysville, Utah; United States
- Coordinates: 41°2′1″N 111°56′35″W
- Area: 1 acre (0.40 ha)
- Built: c.1896
- Architect: Allen, William
- Architectural style: Queen Anne
- NRHP reference No.: 80003897
- Added to NRHP: April 29, 1980

The Henry Blood House is a historic house in Kaysville, Utah, United States, that is listed on the National Register of Historic Places (NRHP).

== Description ==
It was the home of Henry H. Blood, who was governor of Utah from 1933 until 1940. The house was designed and built by self-trained architect William Allen. It was built in c.1896 with Queen Anne stylings and includes an octagonal tower, at about the time of Blood's marriage to Minnie A. Barnes, in June 1896.

It was listed on the National Register of Historic Places April 29, 1980.

== See also ==
- National Register of Historic Places listings in Davis County, Utah
