= John Henry Layton House =

- U.S. National Register of Historic Places
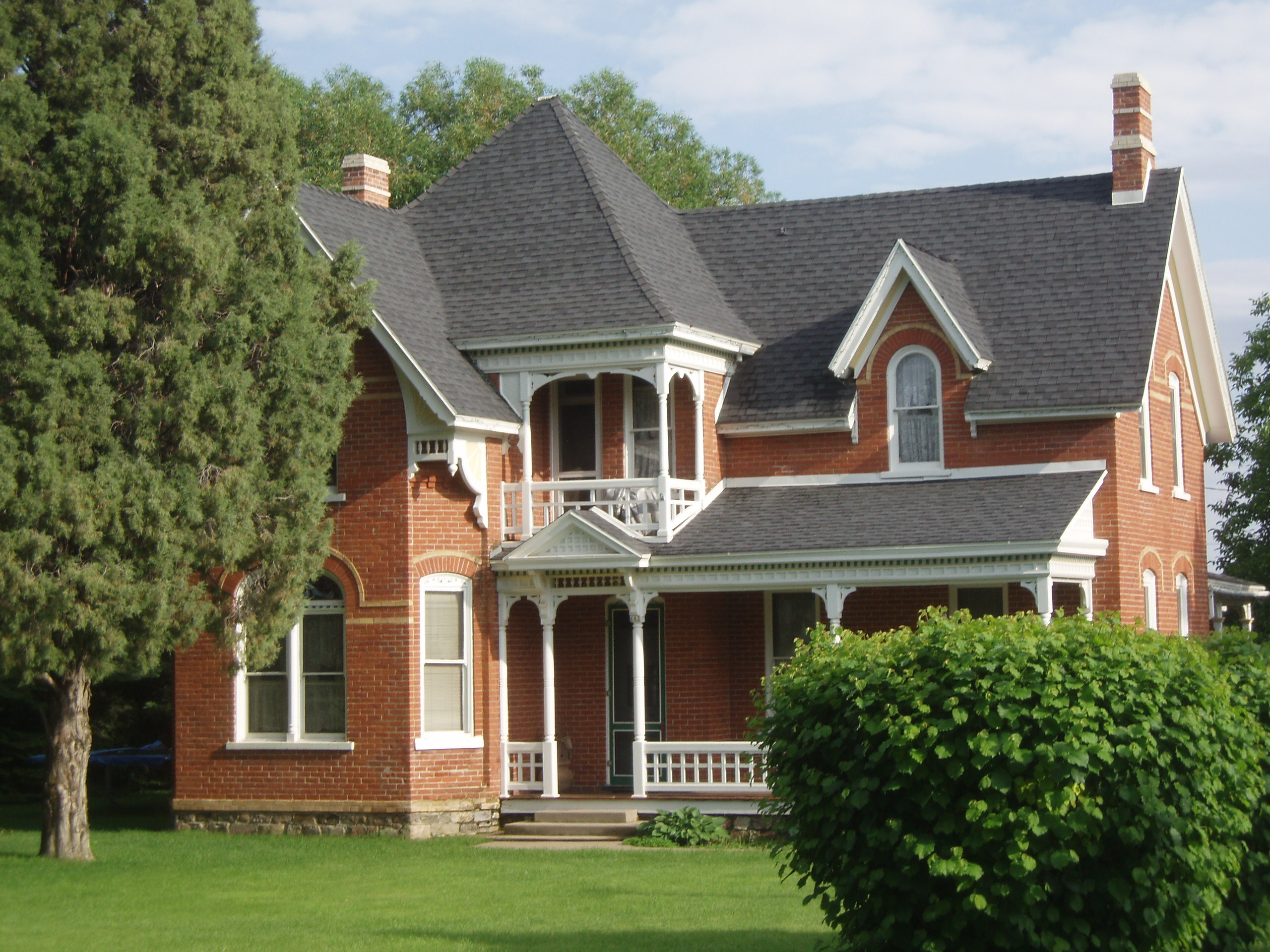

- Location within Utah Location within the United States
- Location: 683 W. Gentile St., West Layton, Utah
- Coordinates: 41.059744°N 111.978831°W
- Area: 3 acres (1.2 ha)
- Built: 1898
- Architect: William Allen
- Architectural style: Late Victorian
- NRHP reference No.: 82004123
- Added to NRHP: February 11, 1982

The John Henry Layton House, at 683 W. Gentile St. in West Layton, Utah was built in 1898. It was listed on the National Register of Historic Places in 1982.

It was designed by Kaysville, Utah architect William Allen and is related to the George W. Layton House a couple miles away, also on W. Gentile St.

It is a two-story red brick house upon a stone foundation. The original outbuildings included a stone wellhouse (more commonly known as a cellar), a frame granary, and a large barn, all of which survive. Outbuildings also included an L-shaped shed for livestock, an elongated thatched shed, and an outhouse, which do not survive.

"The Layton house is of pattern book design, one which Allen may have used for the Joseph Adams house in East Layton, and again in the George W. Layton house in West Layton."
