= John R. Barnes House =

Historic house in Utah, United States

- U.S. National Register of Historic Places
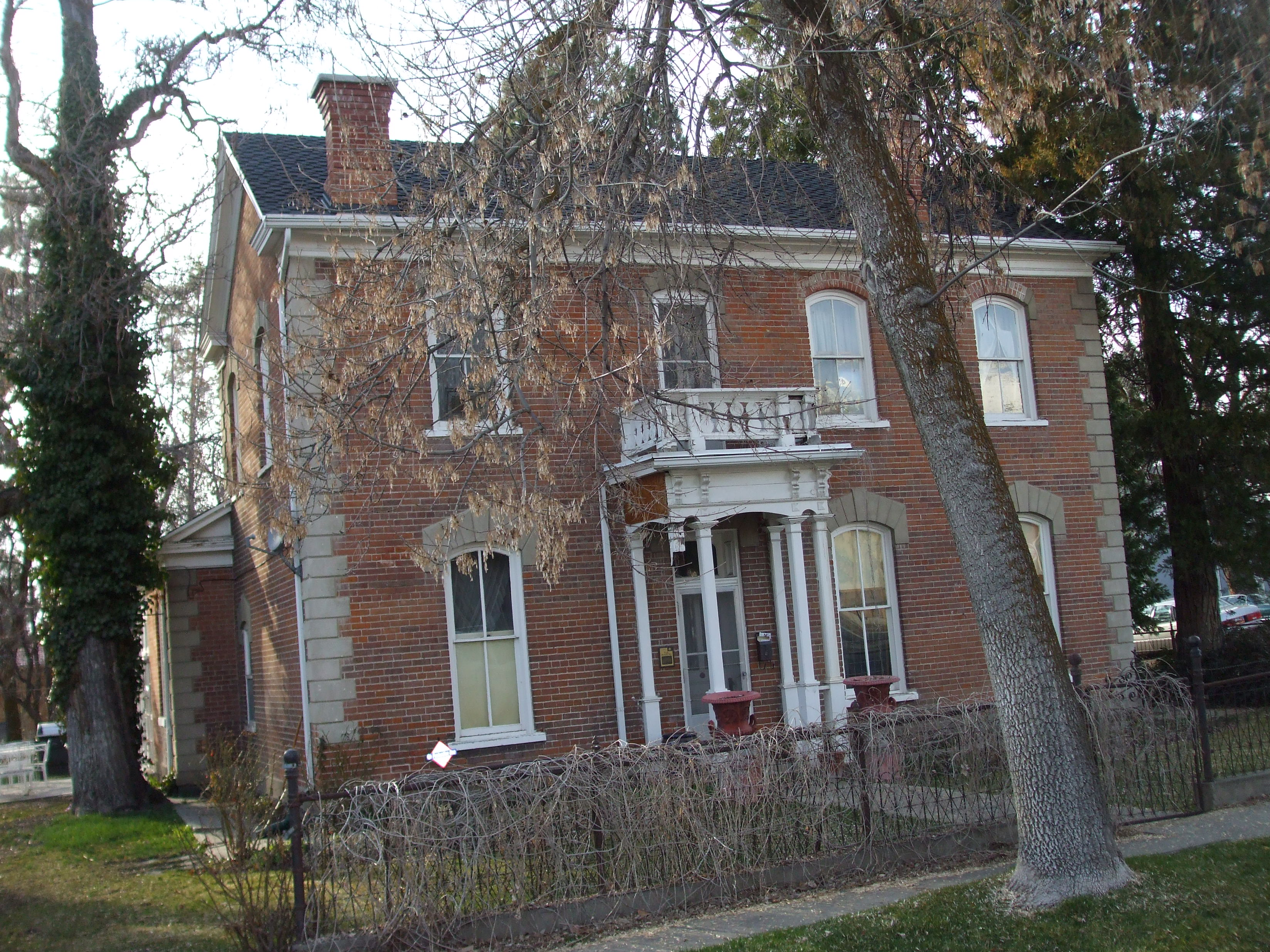
- John R. Barnes House, March 2009

- Location within Utah Location within the United States
- Location: 10 South 100 West; Kaysville, Utah; United States
- Coordinates: 41°2′5″N 111°56′23″W
- Area: less than one acre
- Built: c.1869, c.1876, c.1892
- Architect: William Allen
- Architectural style: Late Victorian, Double-Pen Type
- NRHP reference No.: 82004121
- Added to NRHP: July 23, 1982

The John R. Barnes House is a historic residence in Kaysville, Utah, United States, that is listed on the National Register of Historic Places (NRHP).

== Description ==
The house is located at 10 South 100 West in Kaysville, Utah, United States and was built in 1869. It was listed on theNRHP July 23, 1982.

The house is significant for its association with John R. Barnes, "the dominant economic figure in Kaysville during the late Nineteenth and early Twentieth centuries", and for reflecting his attempts "to maintain a residence fully consistent with his economic status and social position." It was built first as a modest adobe building, then updated to a folk/vernacular plan, then expanded with a Victorian style addition.

== See also ==
- National Register of Historic Places listings in Davis County, Utah
