= USU Botanical Center =

Botanical garden and Utah State University distance education site in Utah

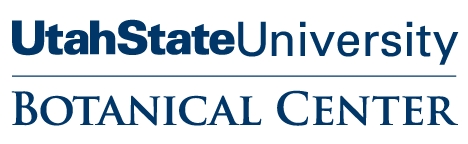
- Founded: 1999
- Location: Kaysville, Utah, United States
- Coordinates: 41°01′09″N 111°56′25″W
- Website: extension.usu.edu/botanicalcenter/
- Formerly called: Utah Botanical Center

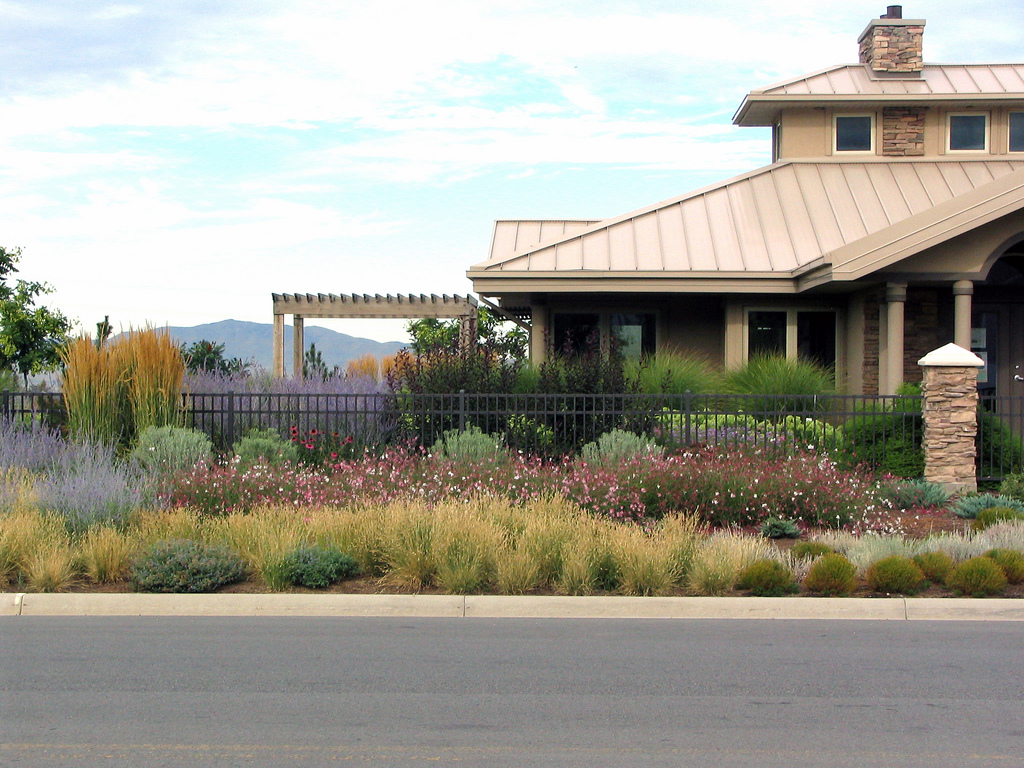
The Utah House project was developed from the grass roots out of concern for the environment. It is open to all visitors.

The USU Botanical Center is a botanical garden and a Utah State University distance education site located in Kaysville near Salt Lake City, Utah. The center offers educational opportunities for children and adults, all backed by USU Extension. It is home to an arboretum arranged according to the irrigation needs of its more than 300 trees and shrubs, gardens and home landscapes that demonstrate wise water use and research aimed at conserving the region's rich array of plants.

== History ==
Originally located in Farmington, the garden moved to the current location in Kaysville in 1999. The USU Botanical Center is the result of a partnership between Utah State University, public agencies, individuals, civic groups, businesses, and foundations. Construction for the "Utah House," a demonstration project of an energy efficient home, was completed in 2003 at a cost of $500,000. The 2,300-square-foot (210 m^{2}) house recycles waste water and rain runoff and has straw-bale walls.

== The Gardens ==
The USU Botanical Center also features an urban fishery, walking and biking trails, wetland areas that support birds and other wildlife, a volunteer-tended garden that provides fresh produce to local food banks, a seasonal farmers market and classes, workshops, educational field trips and other events.

The center offers a farmers market from July through September which features local produce, gourmet foods, and artisans.

== See also ==
- List of botanical gardens in the United States
