= First National Bank of Layton =

- U.S. National Register of Historic Places
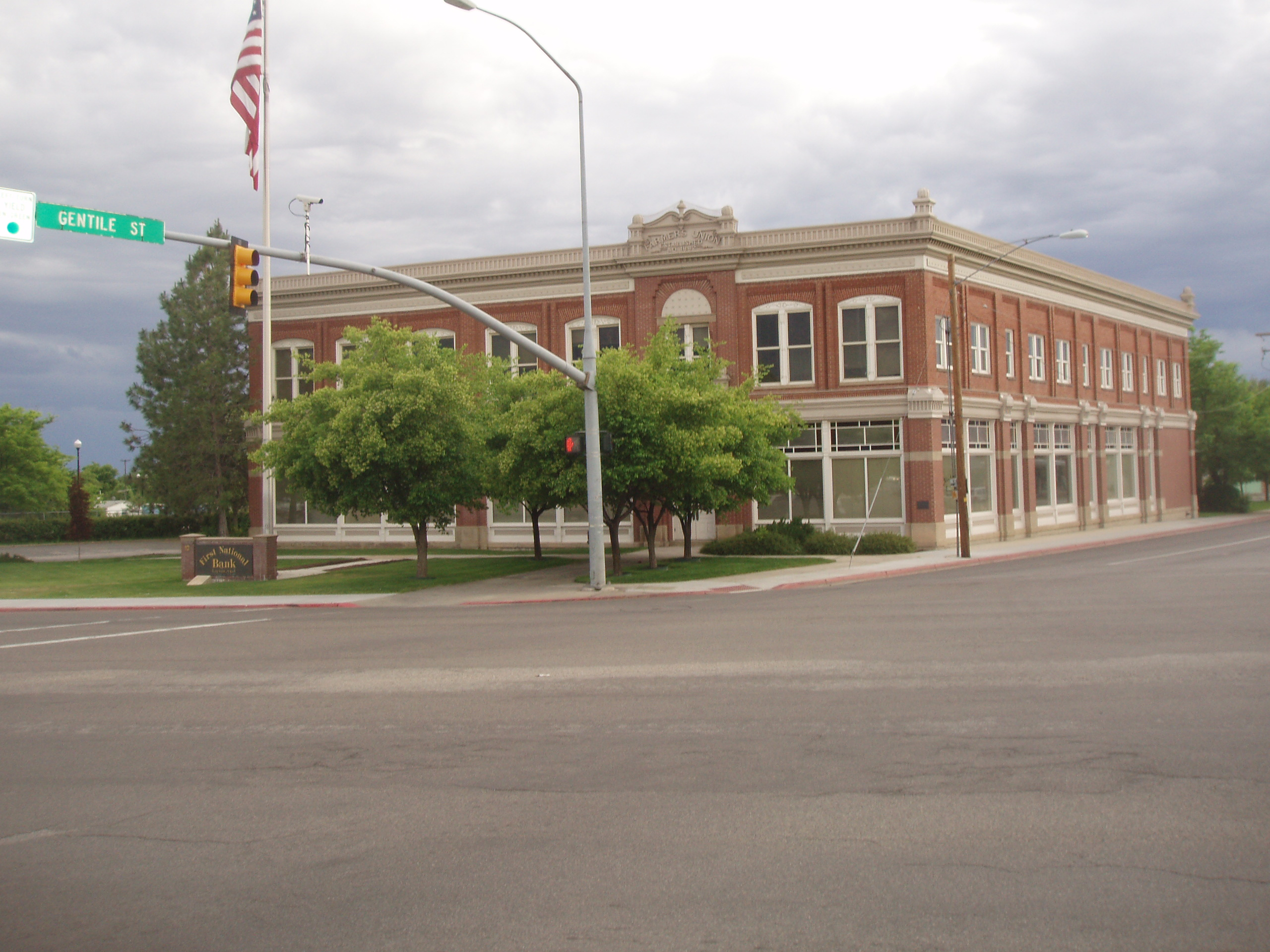

- Location within Utah Location within the United States
- Location: 50 W. Gentile St., Layton, Utah
- Coordinates: 41°3′38″N 111°57′57″W
- Area: 0.2 acres (0.081 ha)
- Built: 1905
- Architect: William Allen
- Architectural style: Late Victorian, One-part commercial block
- NRHP reference No.: 06000232
- Added to NRHP: April 5, 2006

The First National Bank of Layton was a locally owned and operated bank in Layton, Utah. The bank was established in 1905 when the founders pooled together $25,000 to open a community bank. As of 2014, the bank has seven branches throughout the Wasatch Front. The First National Bank of Layton's chairman, Kevin Garn, was named to the position in 2000. K. John Jones was appointed as president and CEO in 2007. In 2019, First National Bank of Layton was acquired by Glacier Bancorp and was re-branded as First Community Bank Utah, Division of Glacier Bank.

The First National Bank's first location, designed by architect William Allen, is on the National Register of Historic Places. It is one of only six Utah banks that have stayed in business for over one hundred years.
