= George W. Layton House =

- U.S. National Register of Historic Places
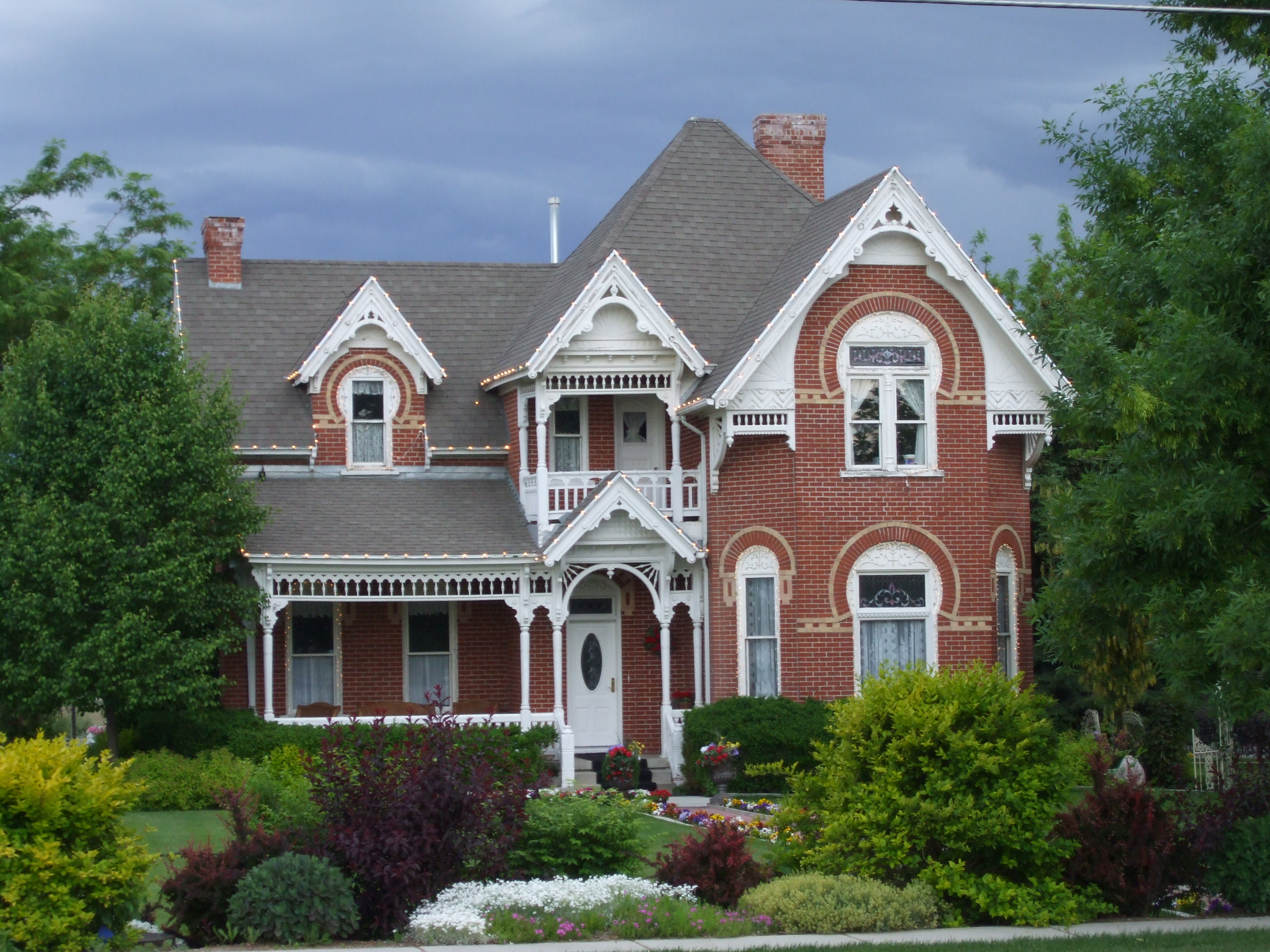

- Location within Utah Location within the United States
- Nearest city: Layton, Utah
- Coordinates: 41.059768°N 112.017996°W
- Area: less than one acre
- Built: c.1897
- Built by: George W. Layton
- Architect: William Allen
- Architectural style: Late Victorian
- NRHP reference No.: 82004122
- Added to NRHP: July 23, 1982

The George W. Layton House, in Davis County, Utah near Layton, Utah, was built around 1897. It was listed on the National Register of Historic Places in 1982.

It is a two-story red brick house with a stone foundation designed by architect William Allen. It was deemed "significant as one of a very limited number of houses designed by the Kaysville architect William Alien, that is virtually unaltered. William Alien was the only architect in Davis County at the time that the Layton house was designed by, and he continued to be the leading architect in the county until the 1920s. The Layton house also documents the use of pattern book house types in the late nineteenth century, and it is the same pattern that Allen used in the John Henry Layton house in West Layton, and possibly in the Joseph Adams house in East Layton. Of the three houses, the George W. Layton house received the most ornate program of ornament, and thereby records one extreme of the stylistic possibilities of pattern book design. The complexity of the brick and wood ornamentation, and its unaltered and well preserved condition make the George W. Layton house one of the most distinctive Victorian pattern book houses in Utah. In addition, Layton, who is credited with the resident's actual construction, served in a number of capacities within the community."

It is Late Victorian in style and is located at 2767 W. Gentile St.

Its pattern book design has an "impressive program of East lake and Queen Anne ornamentation. The pattern Alien chose for this house is almost exactly the same as the one he used for the John Henry Layton house which is several miles east on West Gentile Street. The John H. Layton house has longer proportions, but in general massing it is the mirror image of the George W. Layton house."

In 2019 it was billed as The Grand Victorian and is available for weddings and receptions, having apparently served as a wedding venue since 2002. The venue includes a waterfall and bridge, despite the flat terrain.
