= Fred Crowthers =

American architect

Fred Crowthers was an English-born architect who worked in Charleston, West Virginia for several years in the early-1920s before permanently establishing his business in Detroit, Michigan. A number of the structures he designed in Charleston are listed on the National Register of Historic Places.

== Selected works ==
- 1922 – Briarwood (Charleston, West Virginia) – listed on the National Register of Historic Places in 1984
- 1923 – Barnes-Wellford House, Charleston, West Virginia – listed on the National Register of Historic Places in 1984
