= John George Moroni Barnes House =

Historic house in Kaysville, Utah, United States

- U.S. National Register of Historic Places
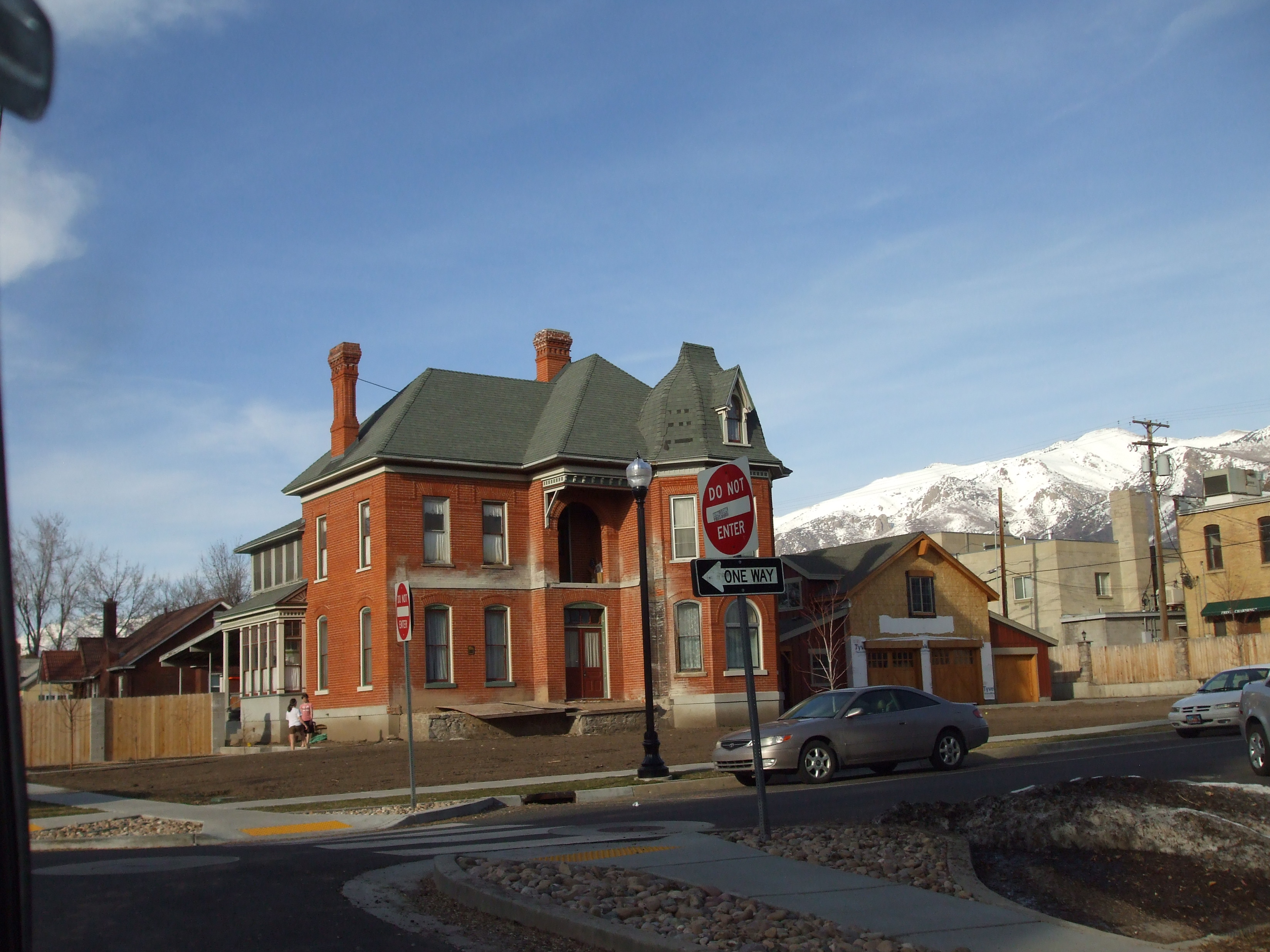
- John George Moroni Barnes House, March 2009

- Location within Utah Location within the United States
- Location: 42 West Center Street; Kaysville, Utah; United States
- Coordinates: 41°2′7″N 111°56′20″W
- Area: less than one acre
- Built: 1884
- Architect: William Allen
- Architectural style: Late Victorian
- NRHP reference No.: 82004120
- Added to NRHP: February 11, 1982

The John George Moroni Barnes House is a historic residence in Kaysville, Utah, United States, that is listed on the National Register of Historic Places (NRHP).

== Description ==
The house was built in 1884 and was designed by William Allen. It is located at 42 West Center Street. The house was listed on NRHP February 11, 1982.

According to its NRHP nomination, it "is significant because of its association with John G. M. Barnes, who succeeded his father, John R. Barnes, as the dominant business and political figure in Kaysville. It is also significant as an outstanding example of a Victorian mansion built in two sections and at least partially architect-designed."-->

== See also ==
- National Register of Historic Places listings in Davis County, Utah
