= Farmer's Union Building =

- U.S. National Register of Historic Places
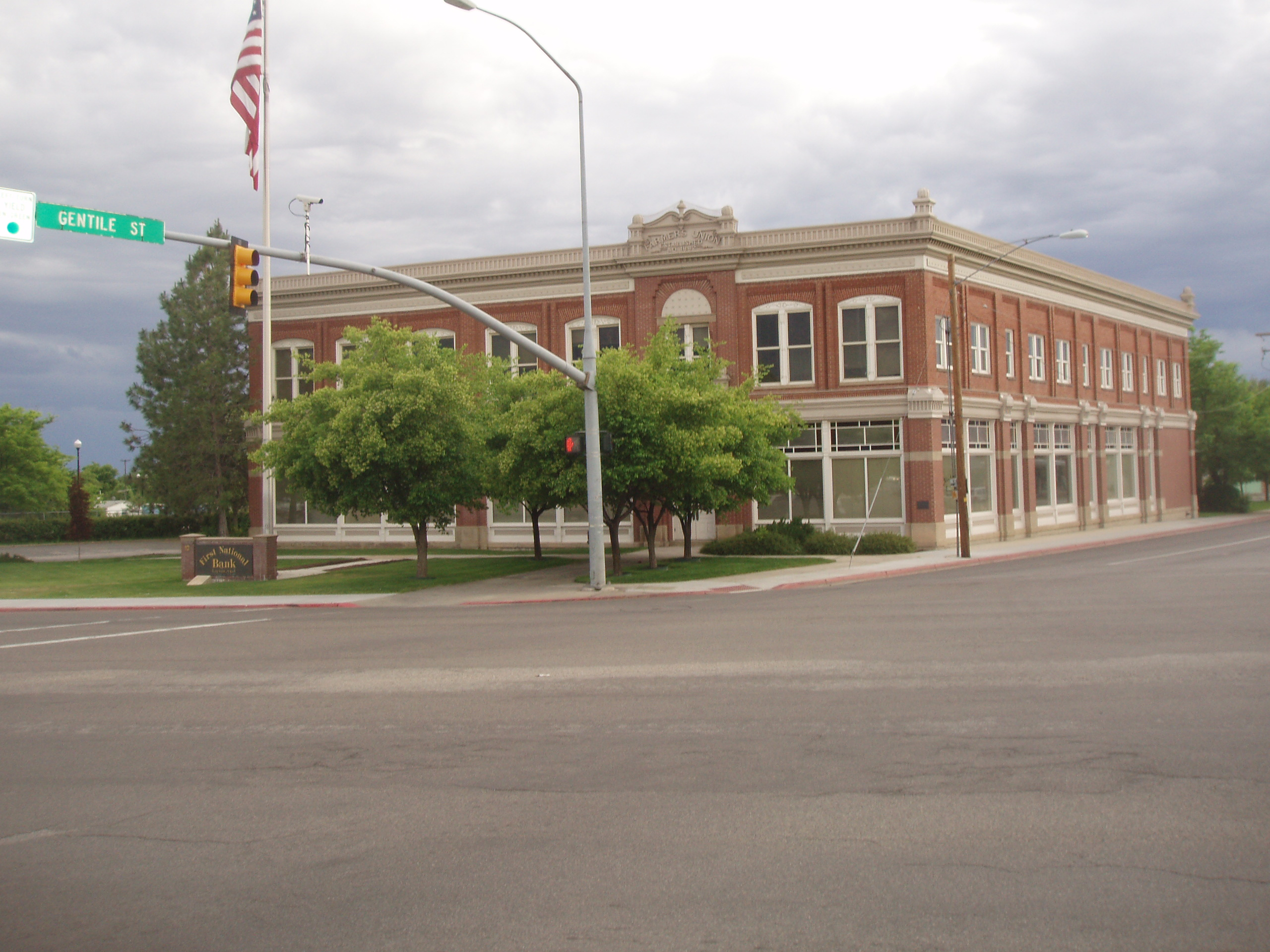

- Location within Utah Location within the United States
- Location: State and W. Gentile Sts., Layton, Utah
- Coordinates: 41°3′38″N 111°57′54″W
- Area: 1.3 acres (0.53 ha)
- Built: 1890
- Architect: William Allen
- Architectural style: Late Victorian
- NRHP reference No.: 78002656
- Added to NRHP: November 30, 1978

The Farmer's Union Building in Layton, Utah, was listed on the National Register of Historic Places in 1978.

It was designed by local architect William Allen. It is a two-story roughly square building now, built in three sections (in 1890, in a year soon after that, and in 1930).

The building was deemed significant for NRHP listing for it having housed the Farmer's Union Mercantile Institution, which was the first commercial enterprise in Layton. The building served as Layton's "primary meeting hall, social center, and recreational facility."

The building replaced the original Kaysville Farmers Union, General Mercantile Store, located at 12 South Main Street. The original building being a small frame store building that was originally built in Kaysville then later moved. The Farmers Union was incorporated in 1909, E.P. Ellison as manager. The Farmers Union served as a bank and post office during the early days of Layton City, but was deemed unsafe after the murder of Mr. Sandall, the night watchman, on March 24, 1898. The Farmers Union closed in 1957. Cannery Sales and Grocery leased the building and later Family Furniture used the space. Note the 'Colored TV Sale' poster in the 1978 photo.
