= Briarwood (Charleston, West Virginia) =

Historic house in West Virginia, United States

- U.S. National Register of Historic Places
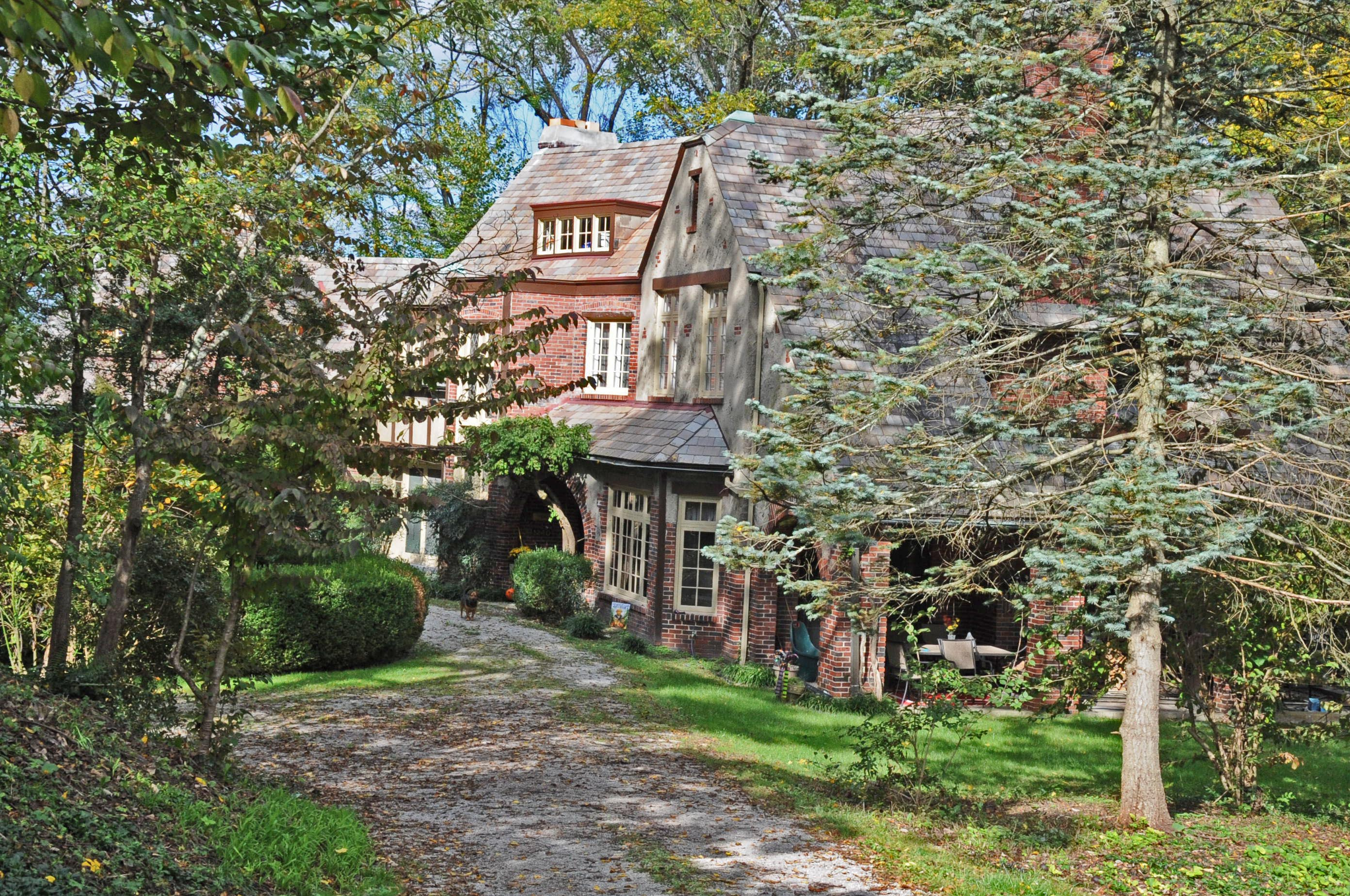

- Location within West Virginia Location within the United States
- Location: 1240 Staunton Rd., Charleston, West Virginia
- Coordinates: 38°20′13″N 81°38′7″W
- Area: 2.5 acres (1.0 ha)
- Built: 1922
- Architect: Crowthers, Fred
- Architectural style: Tudor Revival
- MPS: South Hills MRA
- NRHP reference No.: 84000396
- Added to NRHP: October 26, 1984

Briarwood is a historic home located at Charleston, West Virginia. It was designed in the 1920s by English-born architect Fred Crowthers for Dr. Rhuell Hampton Merrill, the minister of the Kanawha Presbyterian Church from 1898 to 1907. The English Tudor style home features varying roof lines and asymmetrical massing.

The house remains a private residence.

It was listed on the National Register of Historic Places in 1984 as part of the South Hills Multiple Resource Area.
