= William Allen (Utah architect) =

American architect

William Robert Allen (January 1, 1849 – October 11, 1928) was an early 20th-century architect in Utah. His most important work, the Davis County Courthouse, is no longer extant, yet a number of his works are listed on the U.S. National Register of Historic Places. Allen received training through the International Correspondence Schools which was based in Scranton, Pennsylvania, but allowed him to receive training and continue work in Utah.

He nearly monopolized architecture in Davis County, and was irritated to find others' works. He criticized another's work as a "It has a Queen Anne front and a jackass behind".

== Works ==
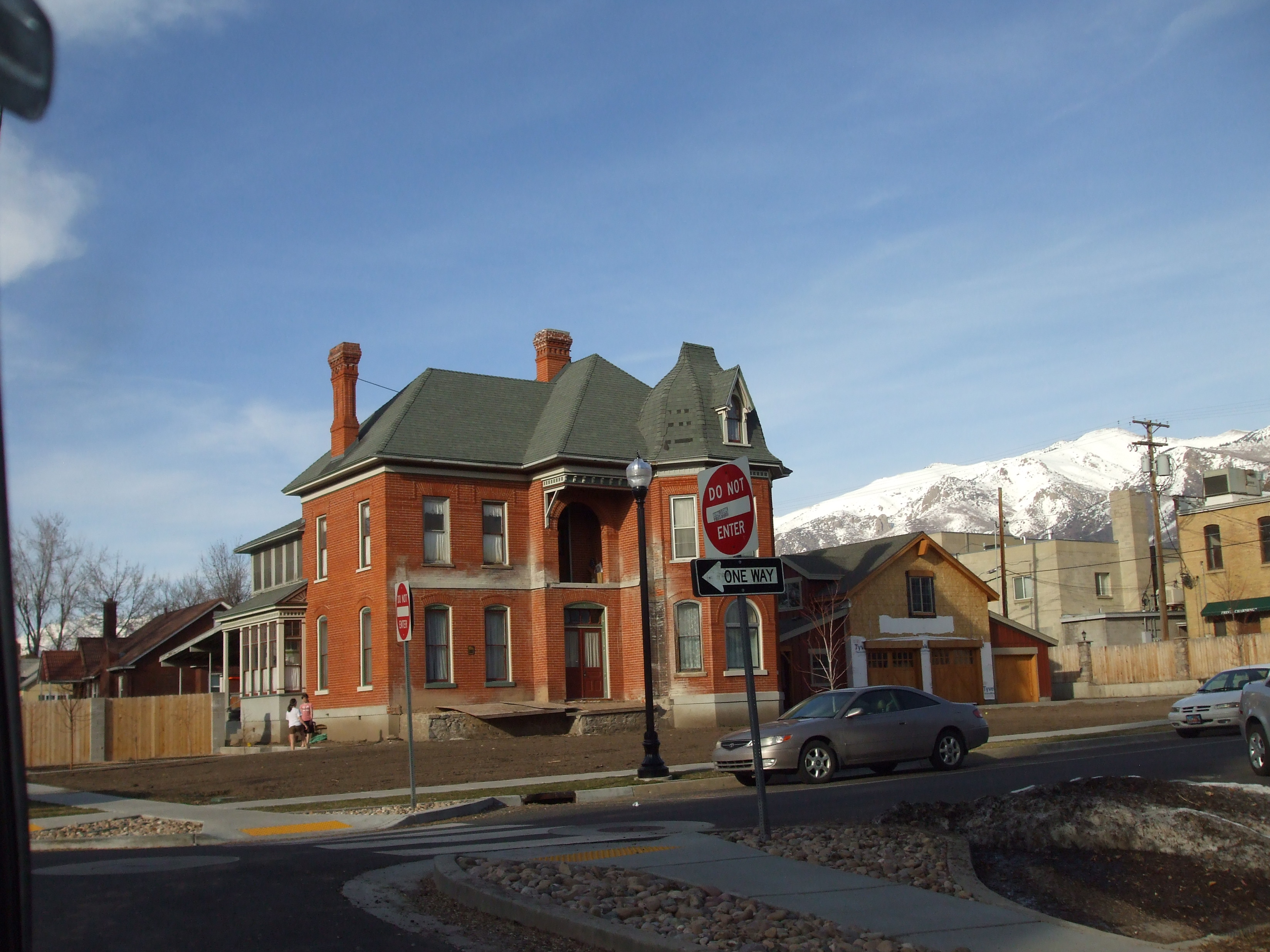
John George Moroni Barnes House, in Kaysville

- John George Moroni Barnes House (1869), Kaysville, Utah, NRHP-listed
- John R. Barnes House (1869), Kaysville, NRHP-listed
- Kaysville Presbyterian Church (1887), Kaysville
- Kaysville Academy (1888)
- Kaysville City Hall (1889), Kaysville
- Farmer's Union Building (1890), Layton, Utah, NRHP-listed
- Governor Henry Blood House (c.1896), Kaysville, NRHP-listed
- George W. Layton House (1897), Layton, NRHP-listed
- John Henry Layton House (1898), Layton, NRHP-listed
- Davis County Courthouse (1899), Farmington, Utah
- Thomas J. and Amanda N. Smith House (1901), Kaysville, NRHP-listed
- First National Bank of Layton (1905), Layton, NRHP-listed
- Kaysville Tabernacle (1912), Kaysville
- Kaysville Elementary School (1918), Kaysville
- Barnes Block, Kaysville
- Hyrum Stuart Residence, Kaysville
- William Allen Residence, Kaysville
- Farmington C&M Company, Farmington

== Gallery ==
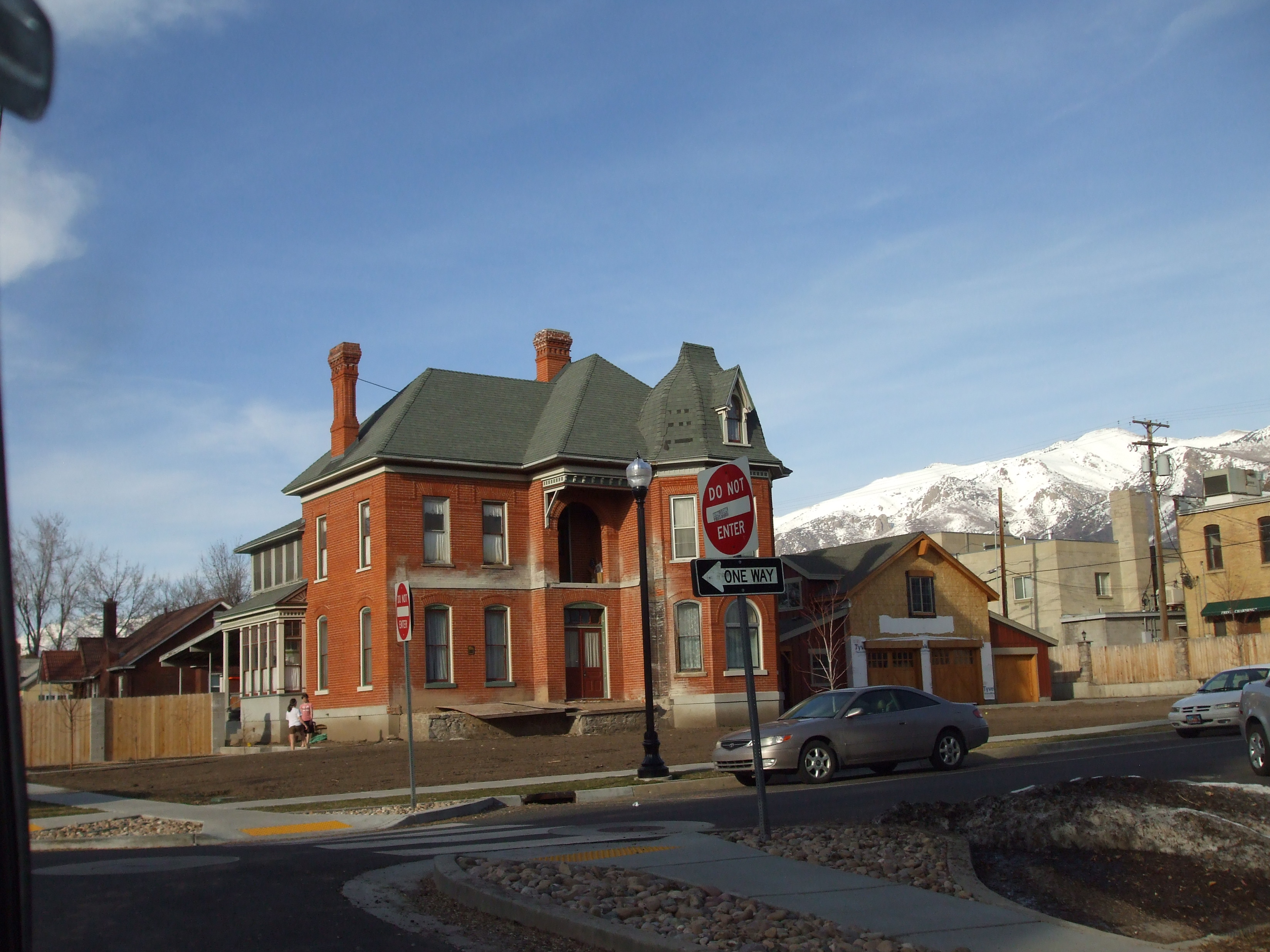
John George Moroni Barnes House

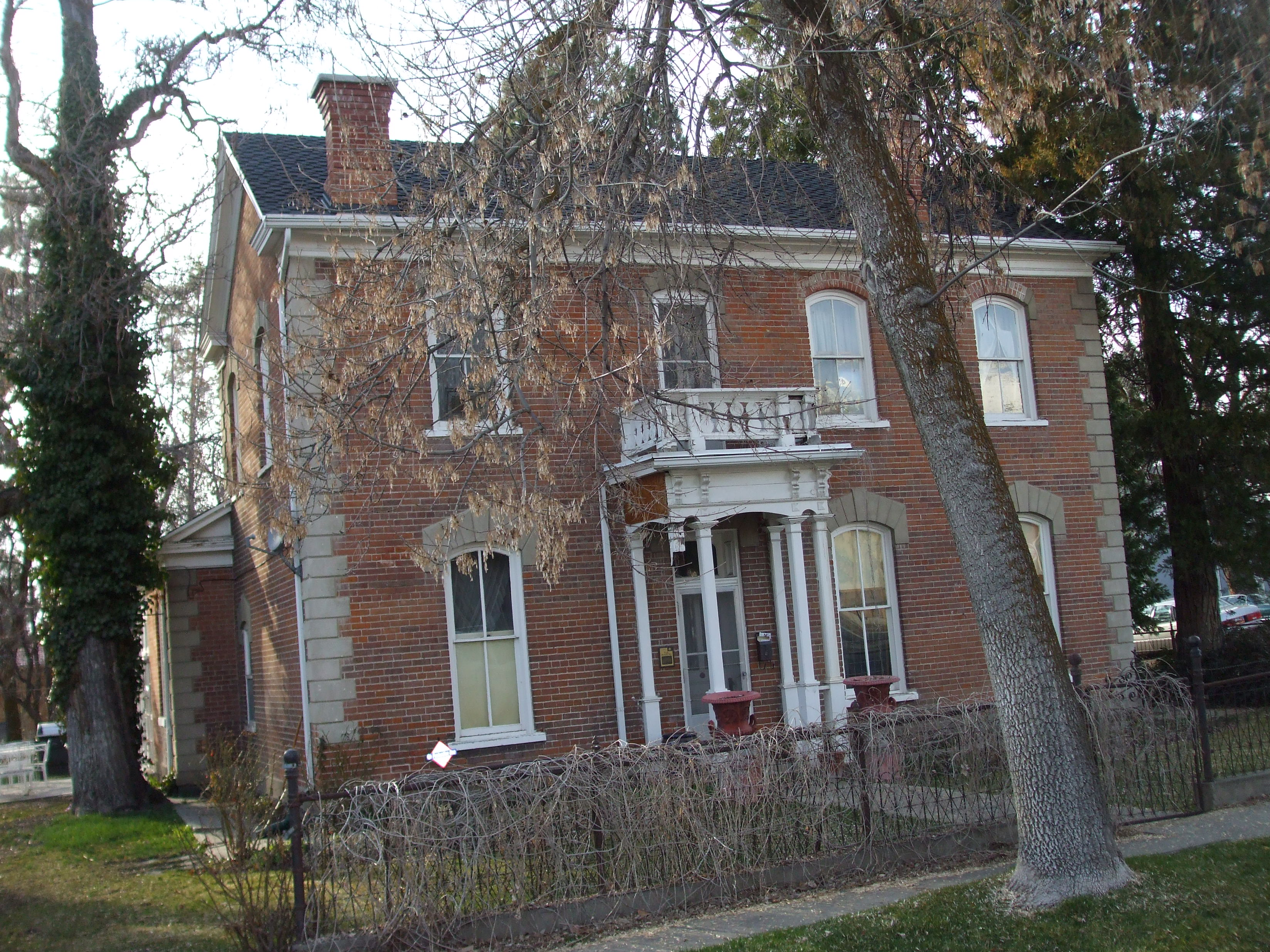
John R. Barnes House

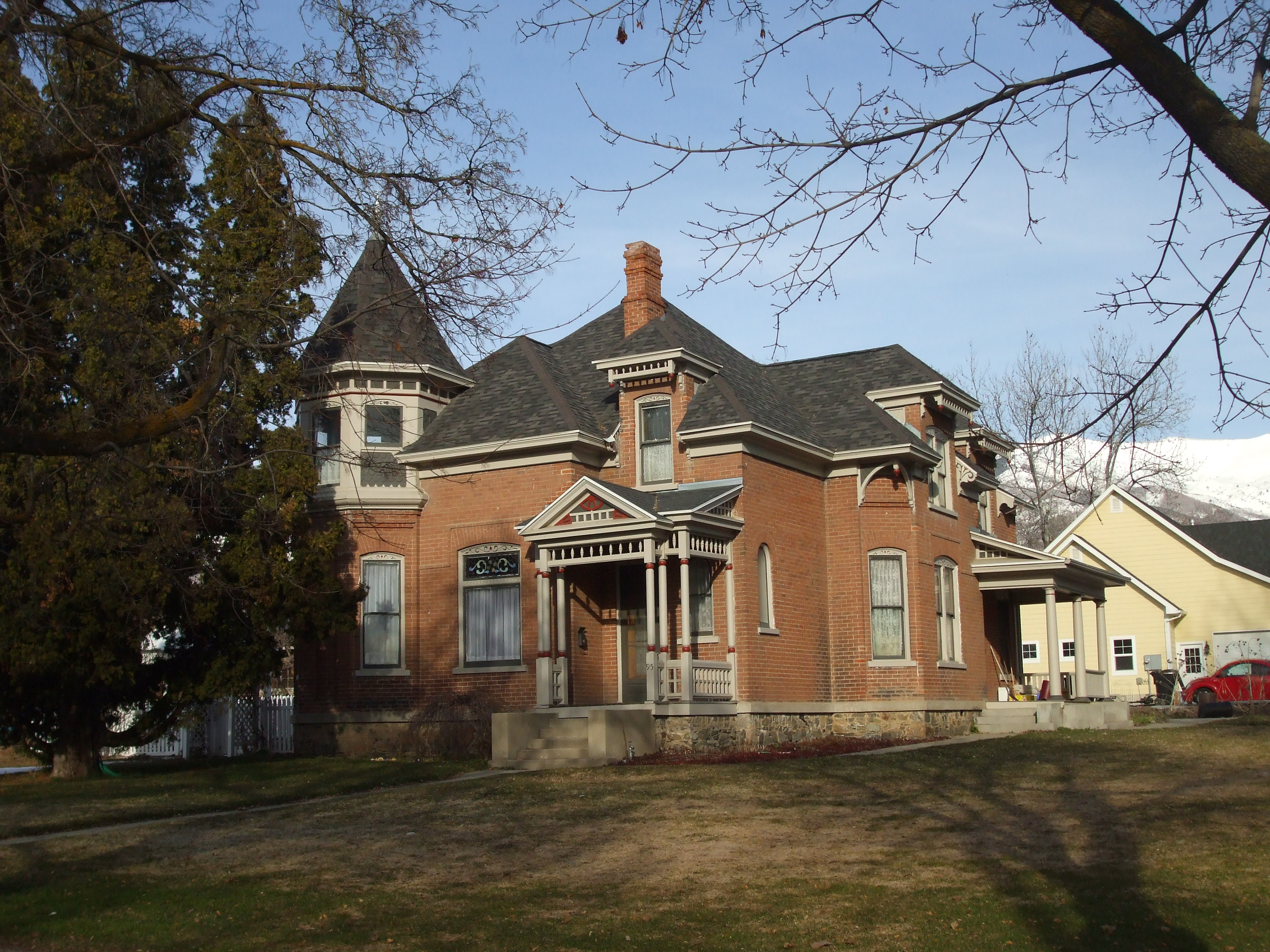
Henry Blood House

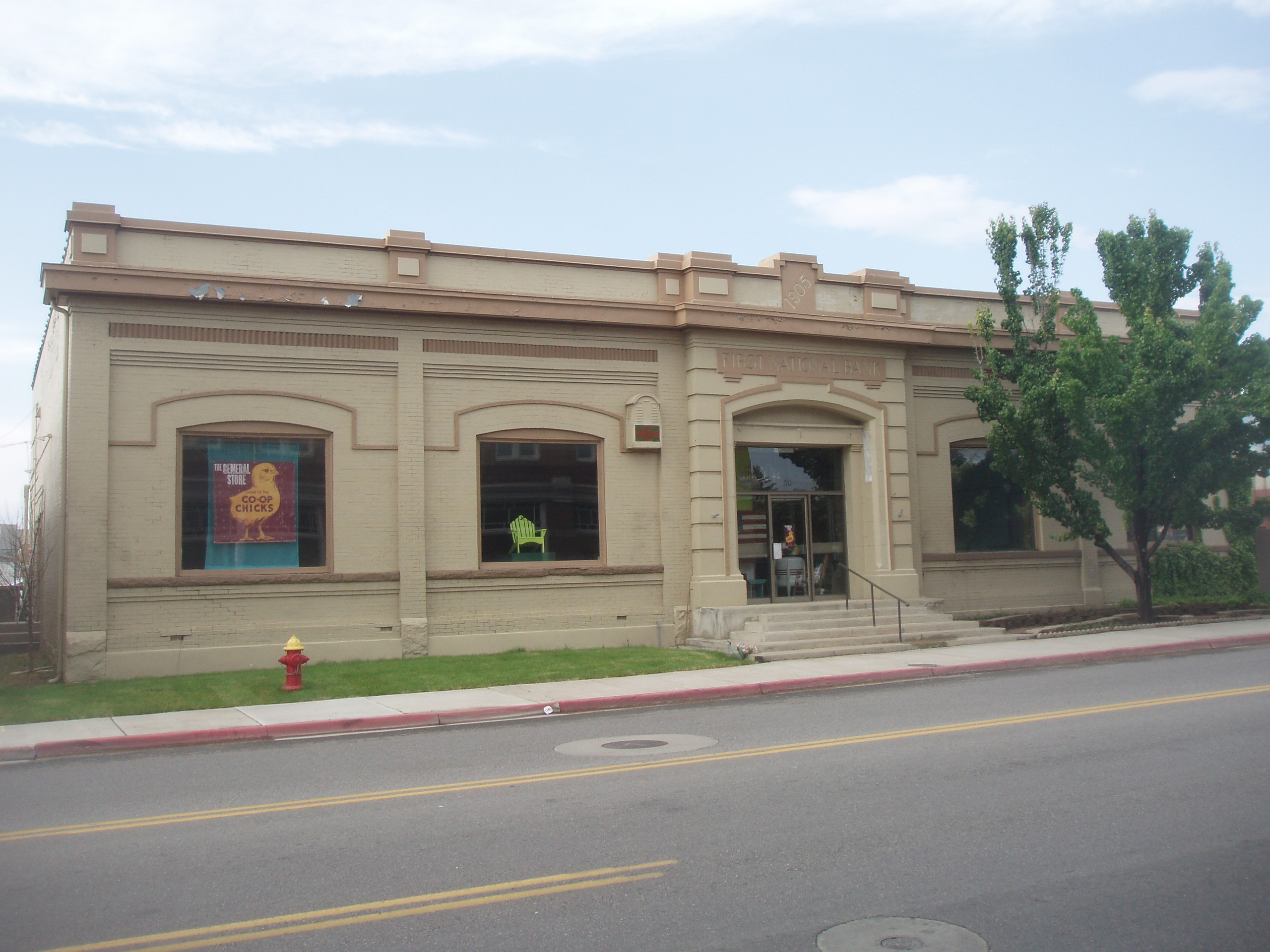
First National Bank of Layton

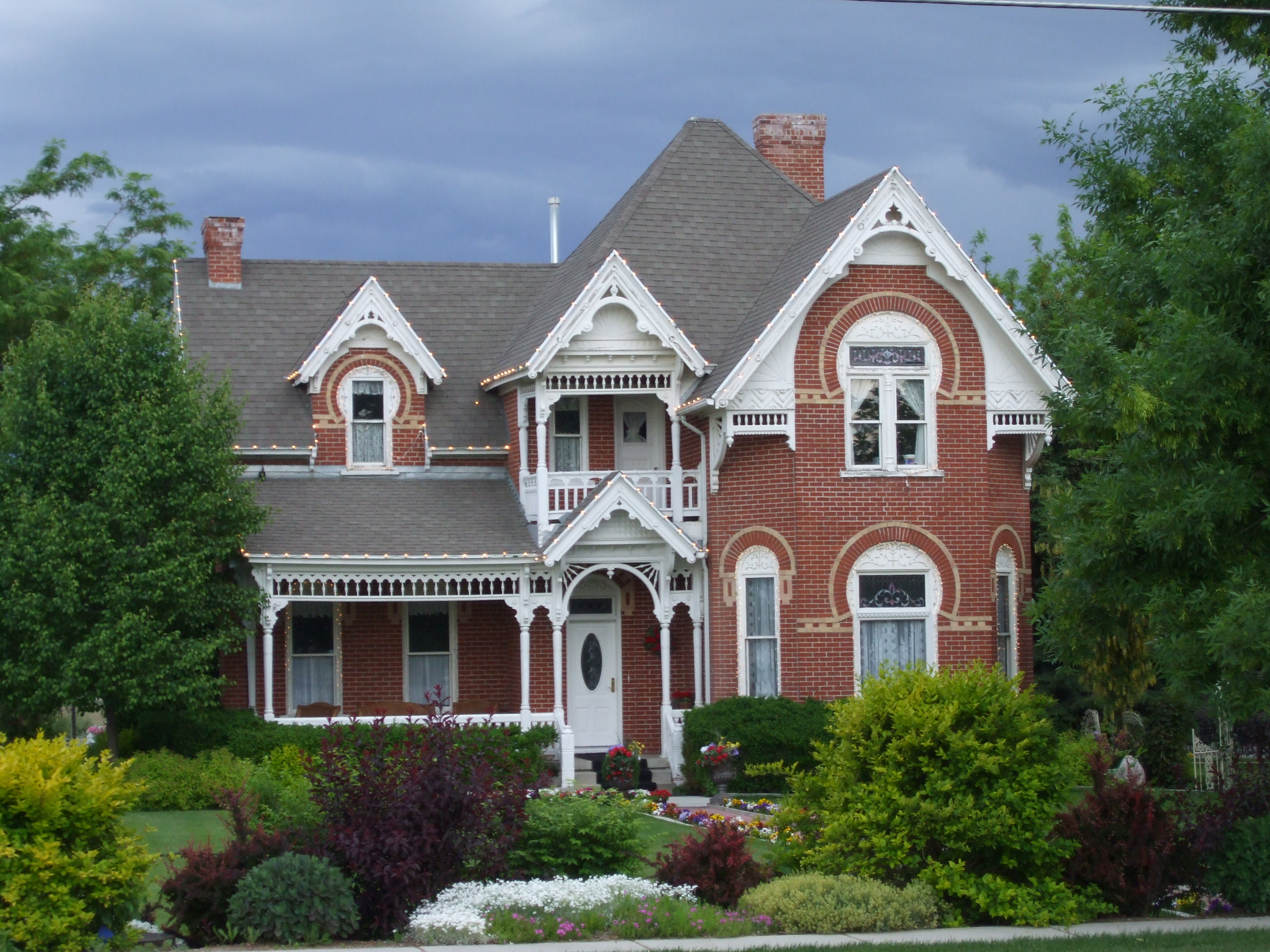
George W. Layton House

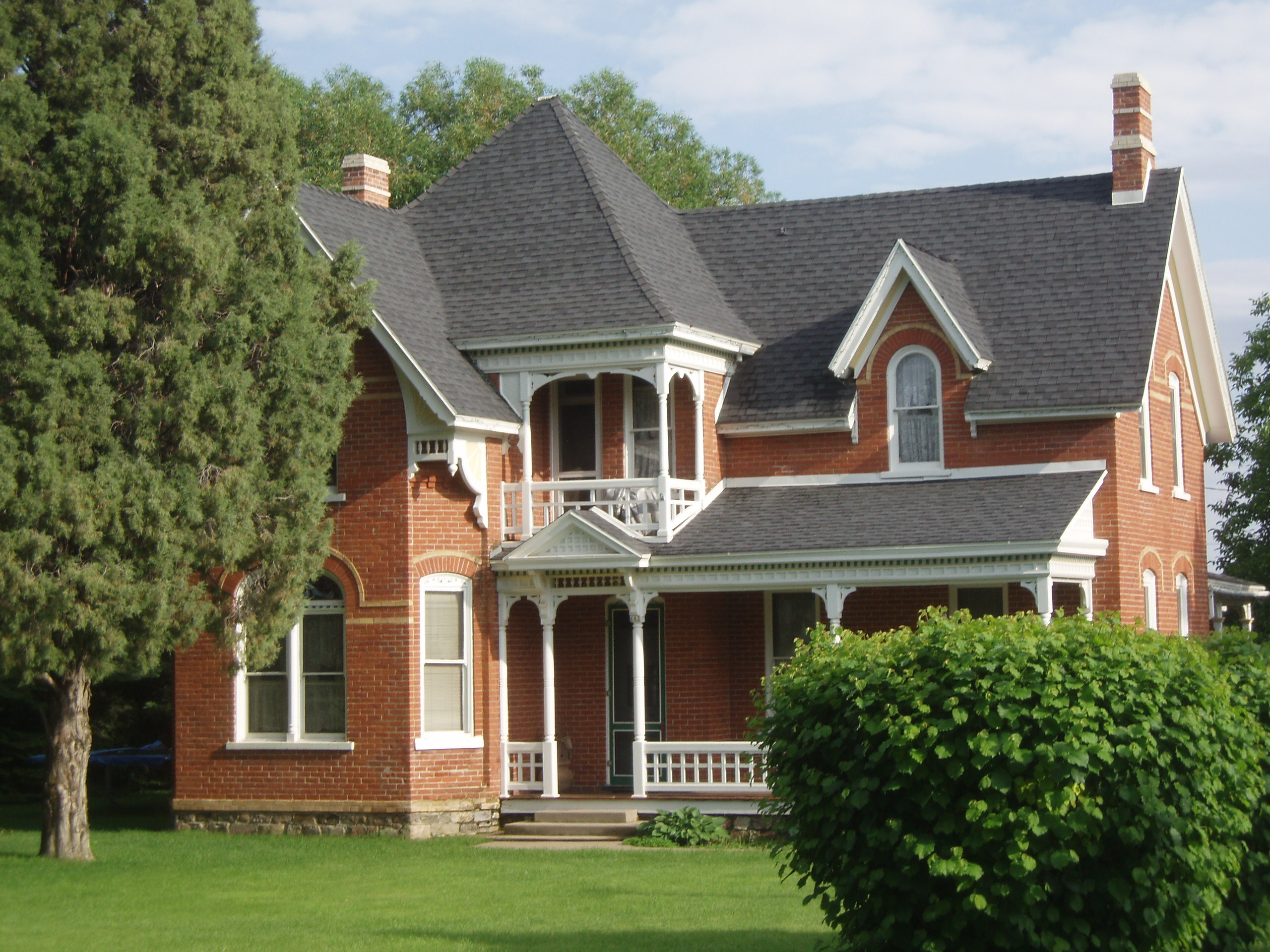
John Henry Layton House

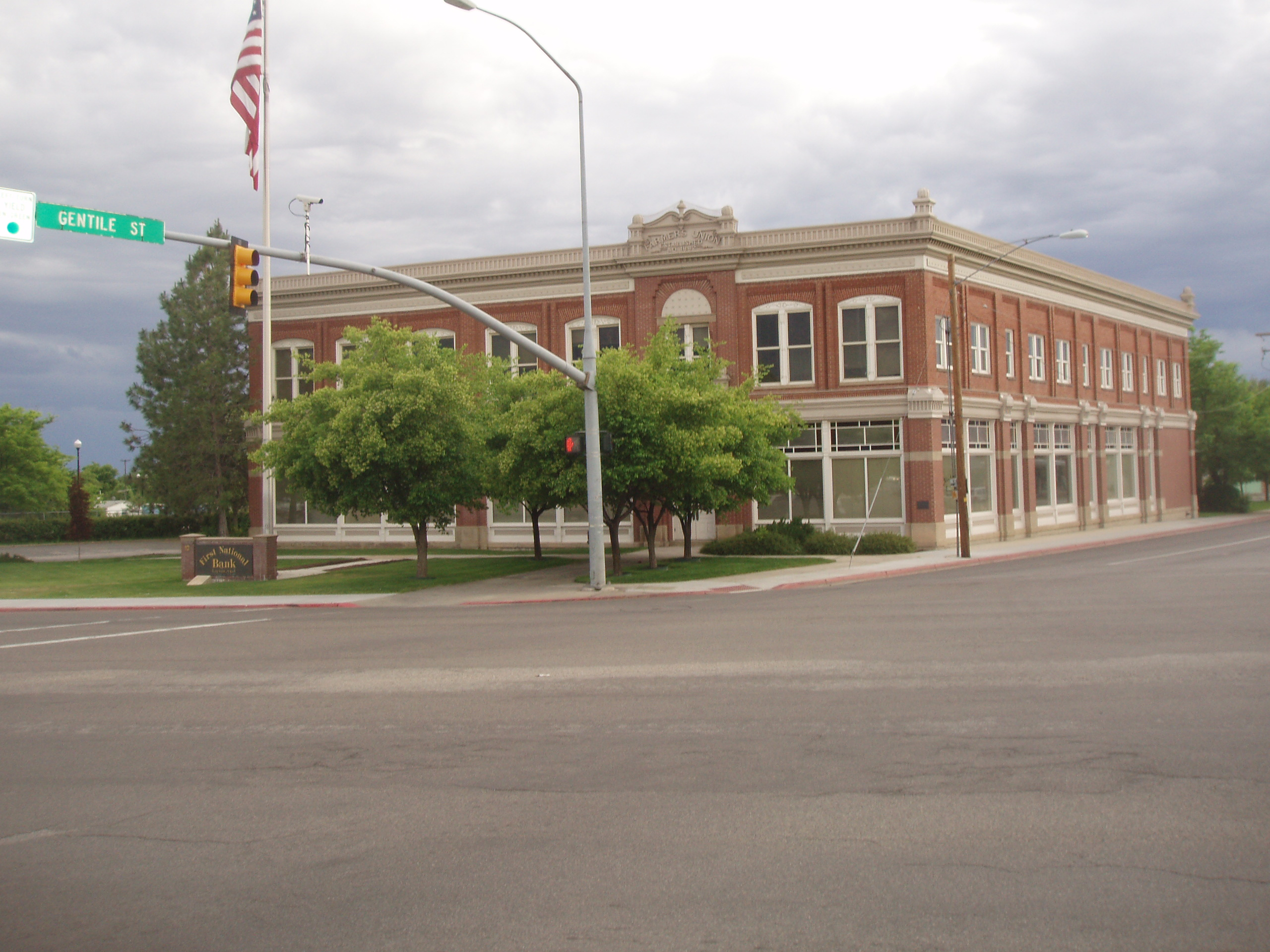
Farmer's Union Building

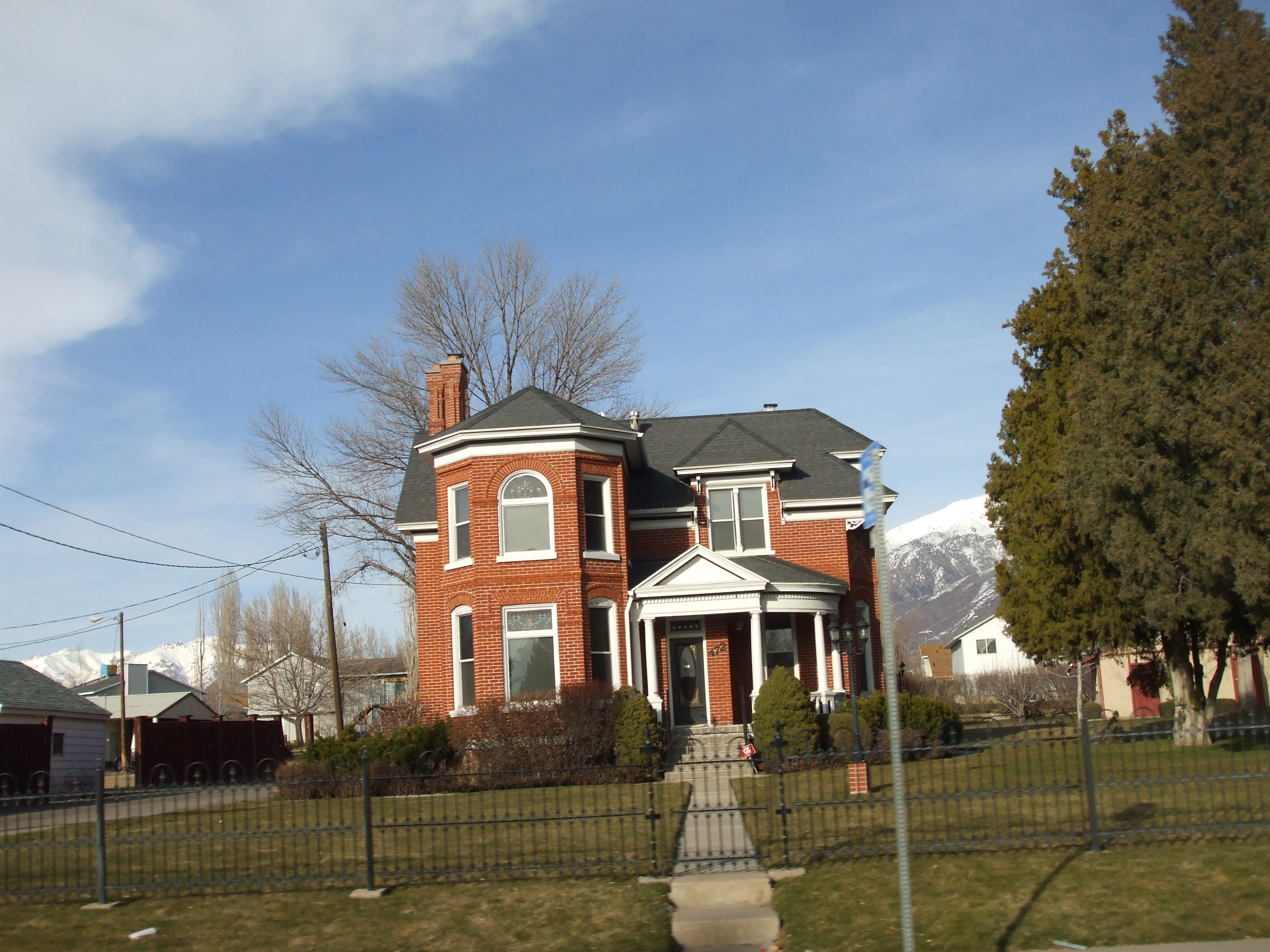
Thomas J. and Amanda N. Smith House

== See also ==
- Photos of the Davis County Courthouse designed by William Allen
- National Register of Historic Places listings in Davis County, Utah
