= Barnes-Hiscock House =

Historic house in New York, United States

- U.S. National Register of Historic Places
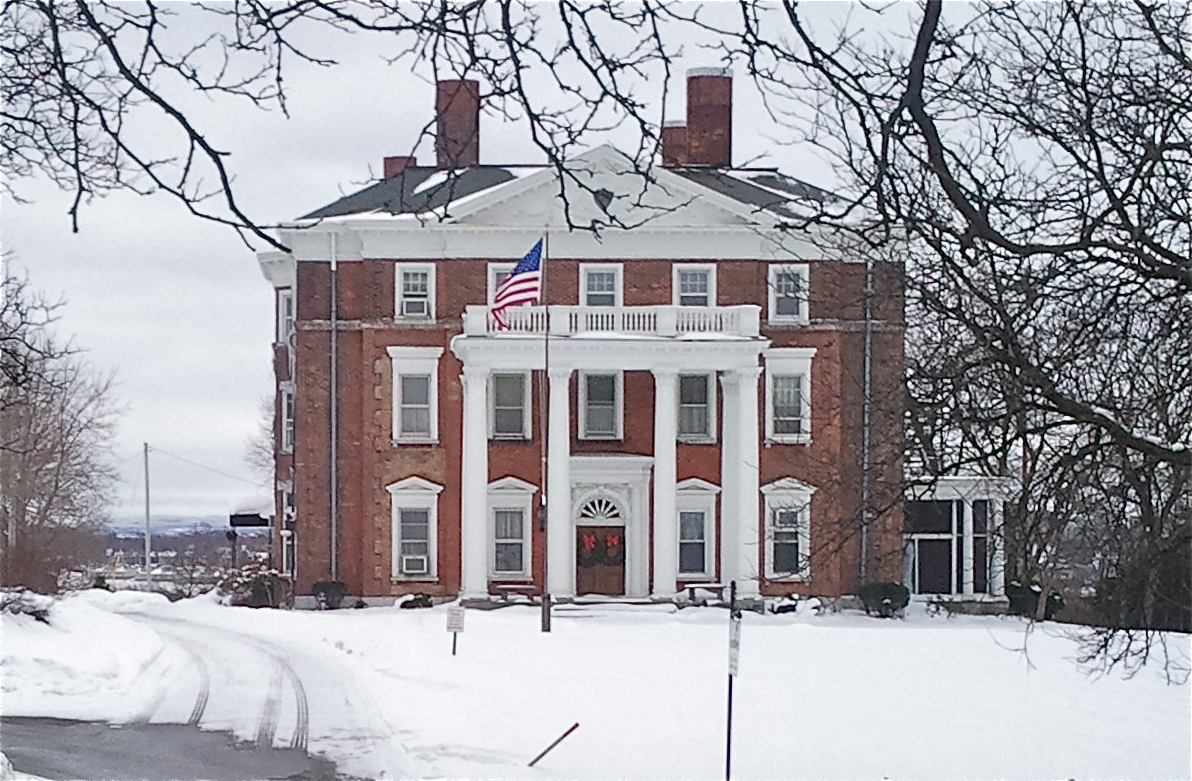

- Location within New York Location within the United States
- Location: 930 James Street, Syracuse, New York
- Coordinates: 43°3′26″N 76°8′12″W
- Built: 1851
- Architect: Joseph Lyman Silsbee
- Architectural style: Colonial Revival
- NRHP reference No.: 10000512
- Added to NRHP: July 30, 2010

The Barnes-Hiscock House (also known as the Corinthian Club) is a historic building located at 930 James Street in Syracuse, New York. It was listed on the National Register of Historic Places on July 30, 2010.

== Description and history ==
It was built in 1851-1853 by industrialist and abolitionist George Barnes, in an Italian villa style. It was later the home of Frank H. Hiscock, "who served as the chief justice of the New York State Court of Appeals, the state's highest court, and who with his wife Mary Elizabeth remodeled it in the Colonial Revival style in the 1890s." Renovations on the home were completed for the Barnes family under the direction of architect Joseph Lyman Silsbee in 1878 and 1882. The home was subsequently enlarged and significantly altered to its current Classical Revival appearance for the Hiscock family by architect's Green and Wicks of Buffalo.

The house was the primary asset of the Corinthian Club, a private women's club which had occupied the building since its founding in 1949, but which faced severe financial difficulty in 2009. The club was named for the Corinthian-style pillars gracing the front of the mansion, which were added in the 1890s renovation.
