= Charles Barnes House =

- U.S. National Register of Historic Places
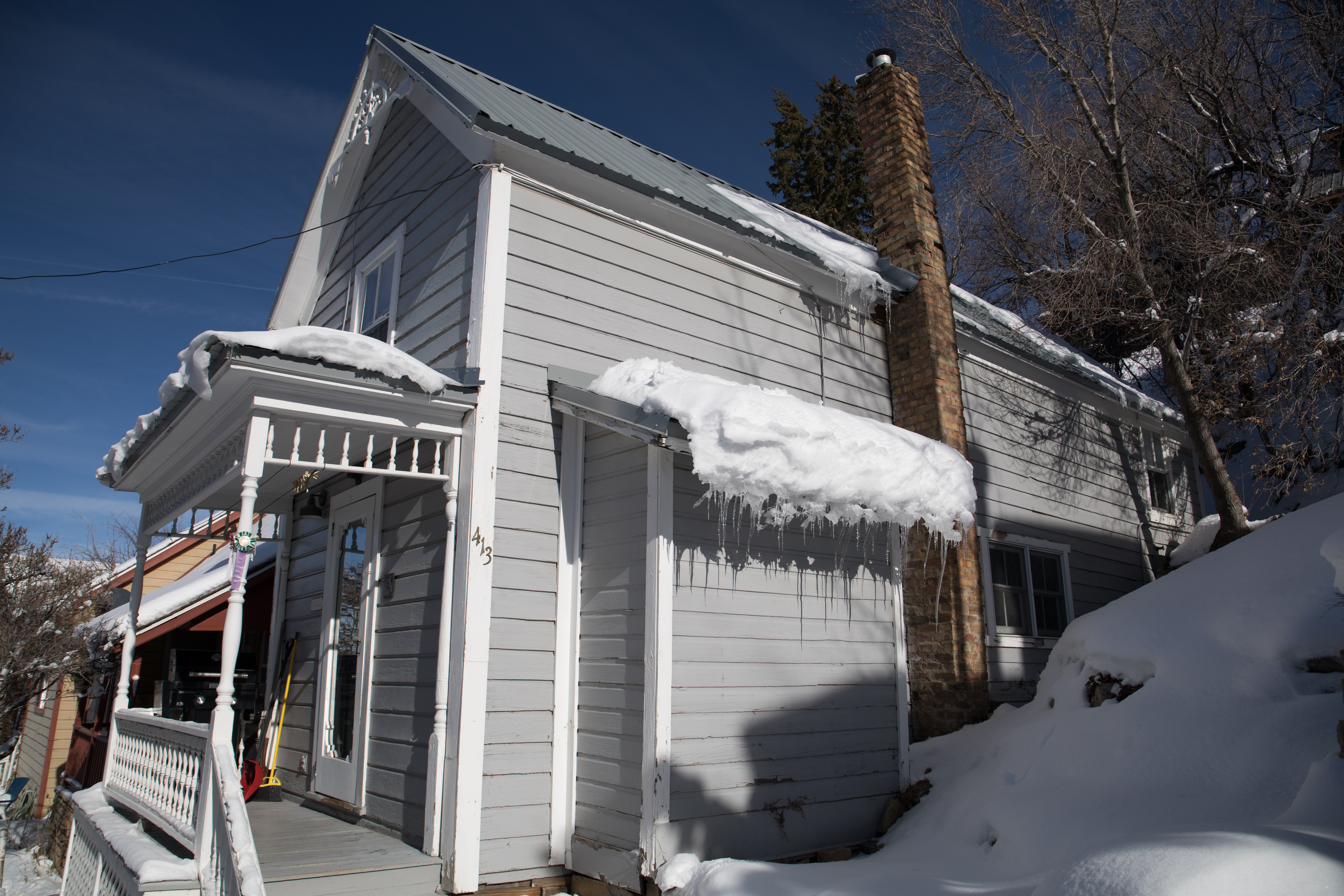

- Location within Utah
- Location: 413 Ontario Ave., Park City, Utah
- Coordinates: 40°38′38″N 111°29′34″W
- Area: less than one acre
- Built: c.1900
- MPS: Mining Boom Era Houses TR
- NRHP reference No.: 84002230
- Added to NRHP: July 12, 1984

The Charles Barnes House, at 413 Ontario Ave. in Park City, Utah, was built around 1900. It was listed on the National Register of Historic Places in 1984.

It is a one-and-a-half-story frame shotgun-style building with a gable roof. It was deemed significant as one of only three extant shotgun houses in Park City.
