= Barnes House (Quincy, Massachusetts) =

Historic house in Massachusetts, United States

- U.S. National Register of Historic Places
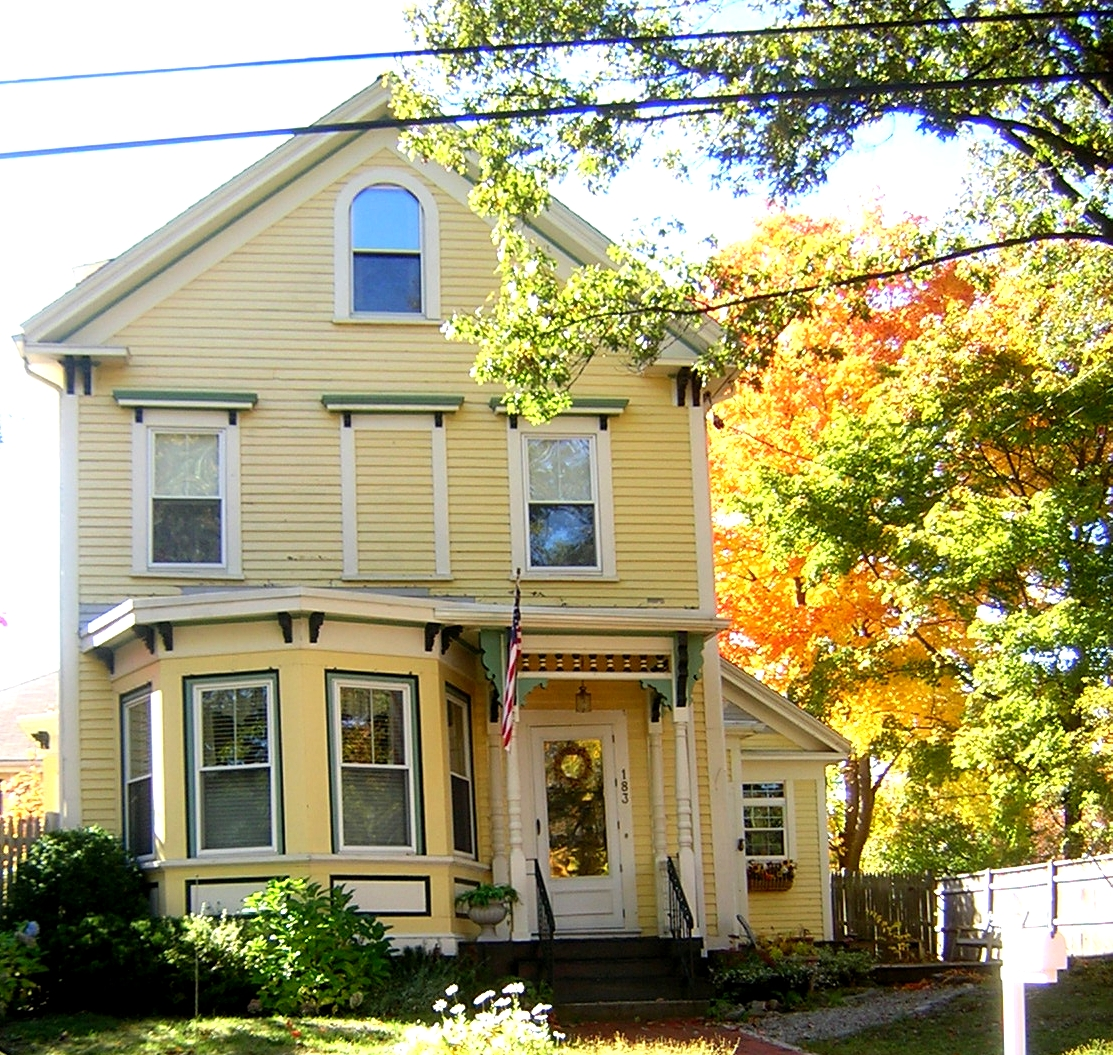

- Location within Massachusetts Location within the United States
- Location: 183 Pine St., Quincy, Massachusetts
- Coordinates: 42°15′40″N 71°1′43″W
- Area: 0.3 acres (0.12 ha)
- Architectural style: Italianate
- MPS: Quincy MRA
- NRHP reference No.: 89001362
- Added to NRHP: September 20, 1989

The Barnes House is a historic house at 183 Pine Street, Quincy, Massachusetts. The 2 1/2-story house was built in the 1870s, and is a fine local example of Italianate styling. It is three bays wide, with the first floor left bays taken up by a large projecting bay with four sash windows and a bracketed eave. The windows on the second floor have bracketed cornices, and the front entry is sheltered by a decorated porch with turned posts. The house is further distinctive because it has a surviving period barn/carriage house. The builder was probably Howard C. Barnes, who was in the musical instruments business.

The house was listed on the National Register of Historic Places in 1989.
