= Spofford-Barnes House =

Historic house in Massachusetts, United States

- U.S. National Register of Historic Places
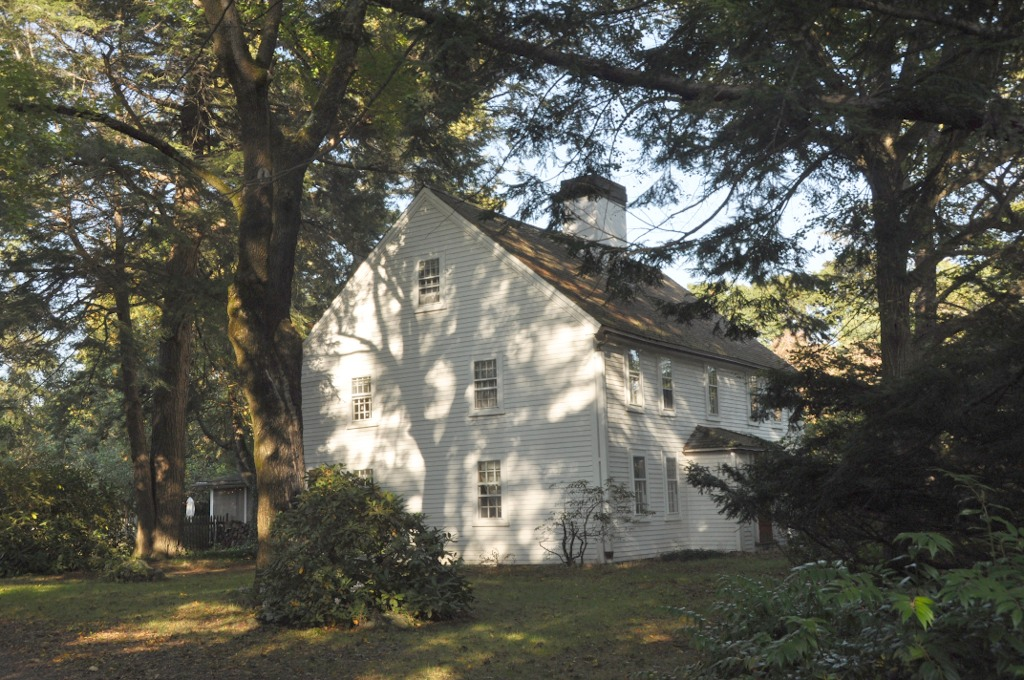

- Location within Massachusetts Location within the United States
- Location: Boxford, Massachusetts
- Coordinates: 42°41′1″N 70°59′6″W
- Built: 1749
- Architect: Pritchard, Paul
- Architectural style: Colonial
- NRHP reference No.: 74000366
- Added to NRHP: September 6, 1974

The Spofford-Barnes House is a historic colonial house at 20 Kelsey Road in Boxford, Massachusetts. The 2 1/2-story wood-frame house was built in 1749 by Paul Pritchard, a leading citizen of town. It was originally built in a saltbox style, but the rear was raised to a full two stories in the 19th century. From 1788 until 1911 the house was in the hands of first the Spofford and then Barnes families. In the 20th century it served for a time as the headquarters of the Kelsey Arboretum.

The house was added to the National Register of Historic Places in 1974.

== See also ==
- National Register of Historic Places listings in Essex County, Massachusetts
- List of the oldest buildings in Massachusetts
