= Barnes-Wellford House =

Historic house in West Virginia, United States

- U.S. National Register of Historic Places
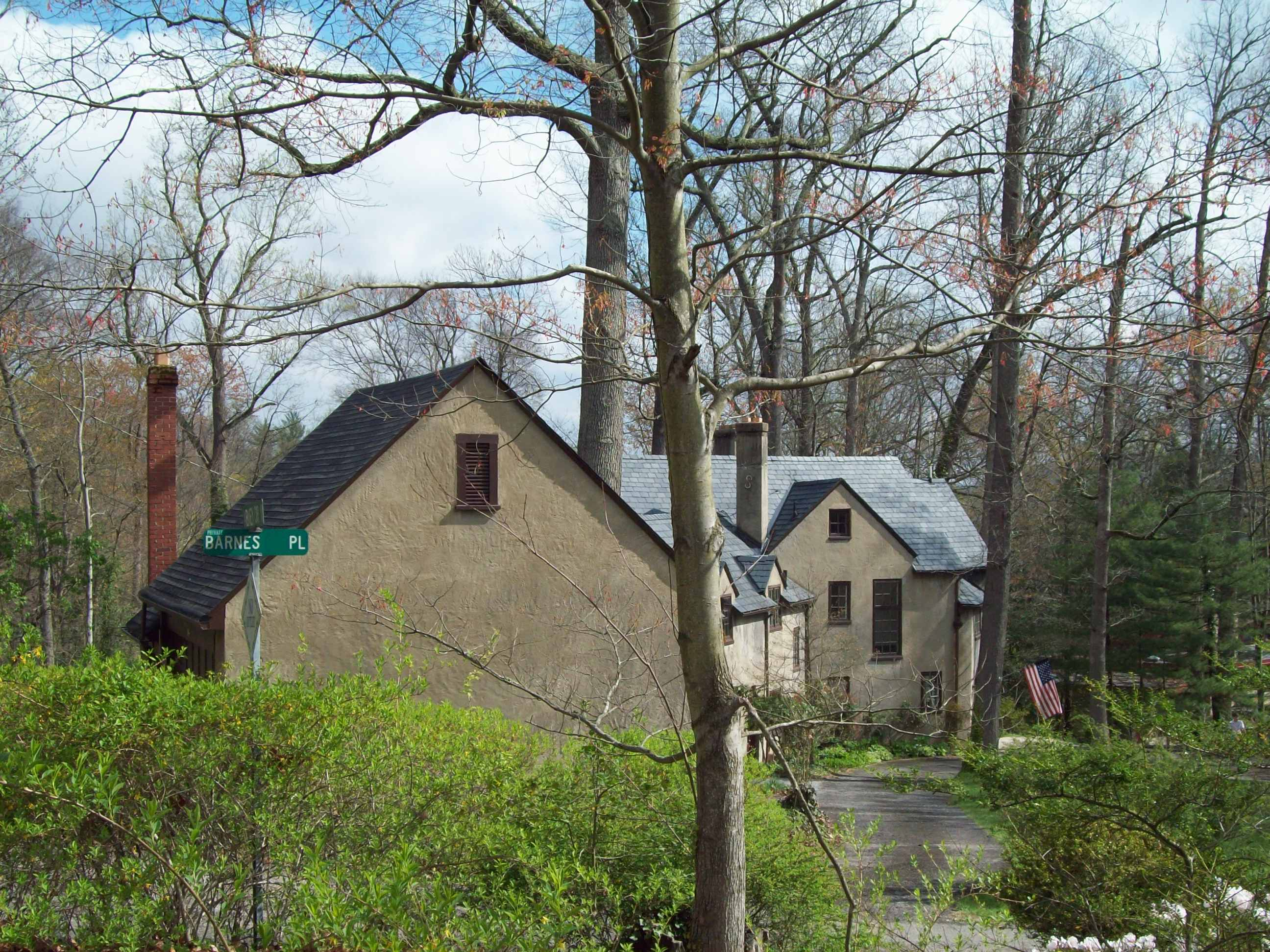
- Barnes-Wellford House, April 2009

- Location within West Virginia Location within the United States
- Location: 66 Abney Circle, Charleston, West Virginia
- Coordinates: 38°20′18″N 81°38′28″W
- Area: 1 acre (0.40 ha)
- Built: 1923
- Architect: Crowthers, Fred
- Architectural style: English Romantic
- MPS: South Hills MRA
- NRHP reference No.: 84000390
- Added to NRHP: October 26, 1984

Barnes-Wellford House is a historic home located at Charleston, West Virginia, United States. It was designed in the 1920s by English-born architect Fred Crowthers for Bernard Barnes, a leading Charleston businessman. The cottage size home is in the English Tudor style.

It was listed on the National Register of Historic Places in 1984 as part of the South Hills Multiple Resource Area.
