= Kaysville, Utah =

City in Utah, United States

- City
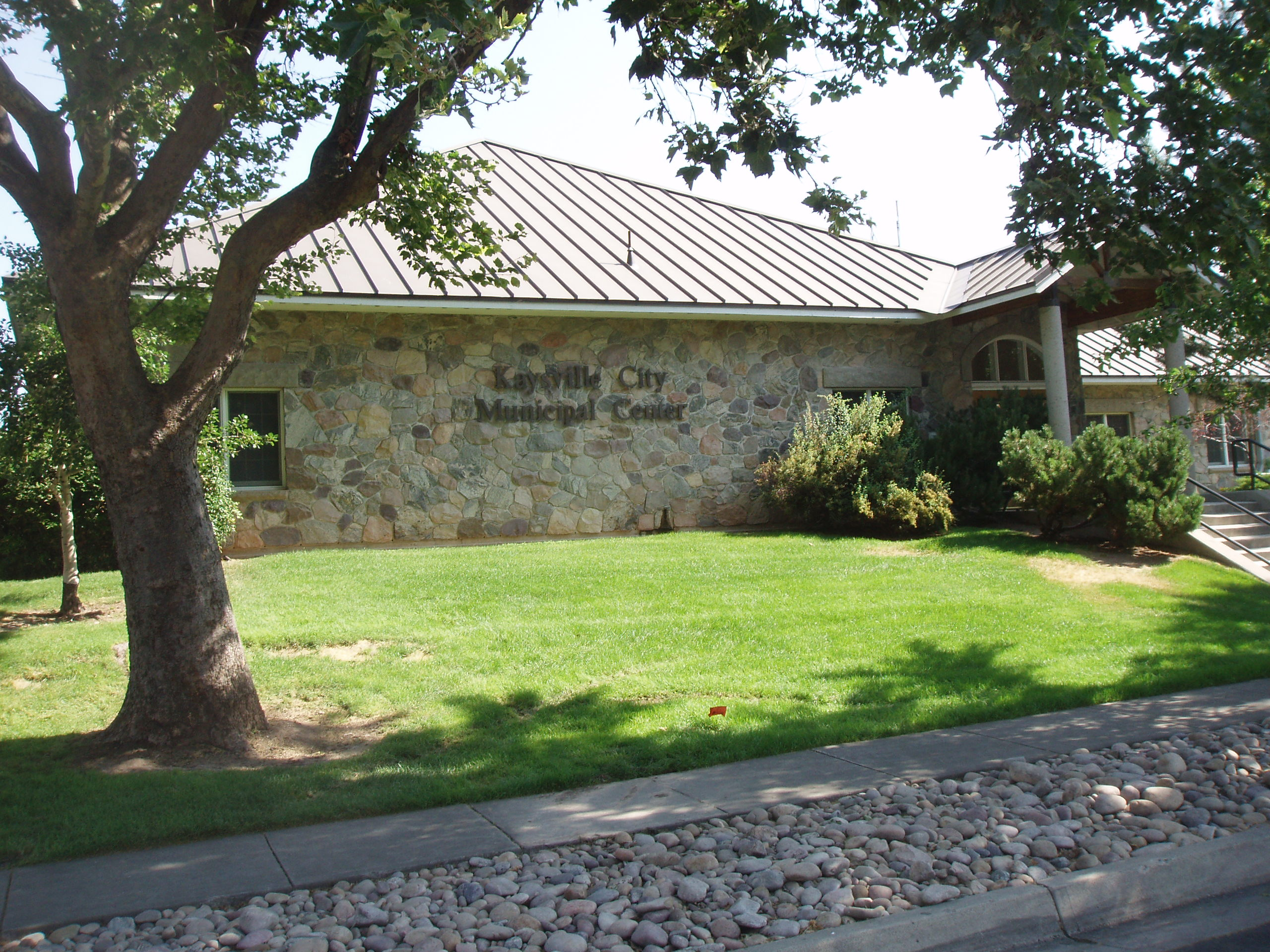
- Kaysville City Municipal Center

- Location in Davis County and the state of Utah
- Coordinates: 41°1′59″N 111°56′10″W
- Country: United States
- State: Utah
- County: Davis
- Settled: 1849
- Named for: William Kay, a pioneer settler

Area
  - Total: 10.54 sq mi (27.31 km^{2})
  - Land: 10.50 sq mi (27.20 km^{2})
  - Water: 0.042 sq mi (0.11 km^{2})
- Elevation: 4,298 ft (1,310 m)

Population (2020)
  - Total: 32,945
  - Estimate (2023): 32,941
  - Density: 3,084.5/sq mi (1,190.94/km^{2})
- Time zone: UTC−7 (Mountain (MST))
  - Summer (DST): UTC−6 (MDT)
- ZIP code: 84037
- Area codes: 385, 801
- FIPS code: 49-40360
- GNIS feature ID: 2410169
- Website: kaysville.gov

Kaysville is a city in Davis County, Utah. It is part of the Ogden–Clearfield metropolitan area. The population was 32,945 at the time of the 2020 census.

Kaysville is home to the USU Botanical Gardens, which also serve as an extension location and distance education center for Utah State University.

== History ==
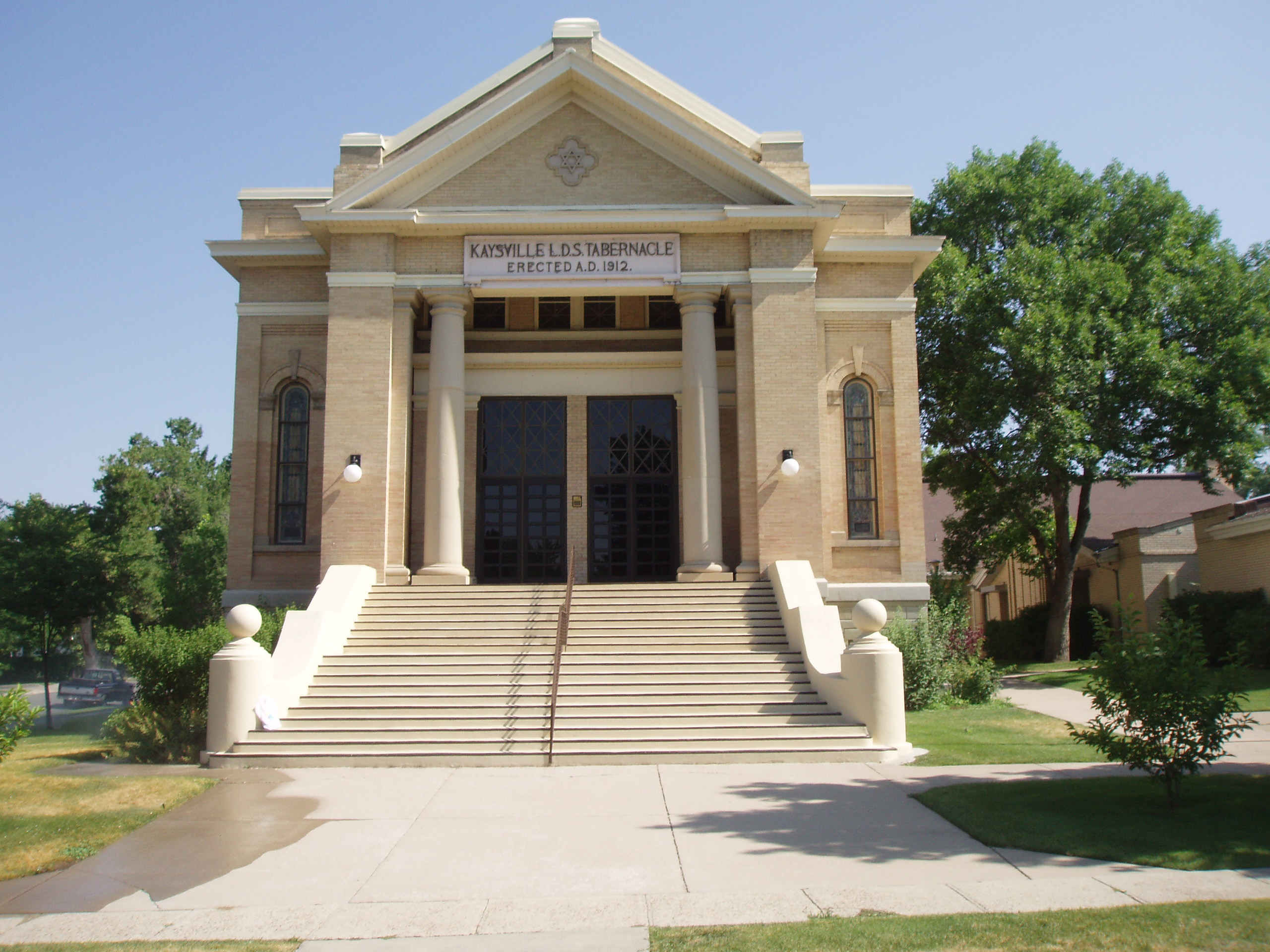
The Kaysville Tabernacle

Shortly after Latter-day Saint pioneers arrived in 1847, the Kaysville area, originally known as "Kay's Creek" or Kay's Ward, was settled by Hector Haight in 1847 as a farming community. He had been sent north to find feed for the stock and soon thereafter constructed a cabin and brought his family to settle the area. Farmington, Utah also claims Hector Haight as its original settler. Two miles north of Haight's original settlement, Samuel Holmes built a cabin in 1849 and was soon joined by other settlers from Salt Lake, namely Edward Phillips, John Green, and William Kay.

Although settlement began in 1847, the name of Kaysville connects with the fact that in 1851, William Kay was made the bishop in the vicinity by Brigham Young and Heber C. Kimball.

After the move south in 1858 (see Utah War), there was an attempt to rename the community "Freedom", but Brigham Young convinced the residents to retain the old name.

In 1868, Kaysville became the first city incorporated in Davis County.

An adobe meetinghouse was built in 1863. It was replaced by the Kaysville Tabernacle in 1914. In 1930, Kaysville had 992 people. Of those residents who were Latter-day Saints, they all were in the Kaysville Ward which also covered most of the rest of the Kaysville Precinct.

In 1977, United Airlines Flight 2860 crashed near Kaysville.

By 2008, there were seven Mormon stakes (similar to a diocese) in Kaysville.

In November 2009, Kaysville voters elected Steve Hiatt as Kaysville City's 38th mayor and the youngest mayor in Utah. He was sworn in on January 4, 2010. He was re-elected for a second four-year term in November 2013.

The current mayor, Tamara Tran, won the 2021 election with 59.95 percent of the popular vote over Jay Welk.

== Geography ==
Kaysville is bordered by the city of Layton to the north, Fruit Heights to the east, and Farmington, the county seat, to the south. According to the United States Census Bureau, Kaysville has a total area of 10.5 square miles (27.2 km^{2}), of which 0.04 square miles (0.1 km^{2}), or 0.48%, is water.

== Demographics ==
Historical population
| Census | Pop. | Note | %± |
|---|---|---|---|
| 1890 | 548 | | — |
| 1900 | 1,708 | | 211.7% |
| 1910 | 887 | | −48.1% |
| 1920 | 809 | | −8.8% |
| 1930 | 992 | | 22.6% |
| 1940 | 1,211 | | 22.1% |
| 1950 | 1,898 | | 56.7% |
| 1960 | 3,608 | | 90.1% |
| 1970 | 6,192 | | 71.6% |
| 1980 | 10,331 | | 66.8% |
| 1990 | 13,961 | | 35.1% |
| 2000 | 20,351 | | 45.8% |
| 2010 | 27,368 | | 34.5% |
| 2020 | 32,945 | | 20.4% |
| 2023 (est.) | 32,941 | | 0.0% |
U.S. Decennial Census

=== 2020 census ===
As of the 2020 census, Kaysville had a population of 32,945 and a population density of 3,135.3 people per square mile (1,210.5/km^{2}).

The median age was 29.9 years, 36.6% of residents were under the age of 18, and 9.7% of residents were 65 years of age or older. For every 100 females there were 100.0 males, and for every 100 females age 18 and over there were 95.1 males age 18 and over.

99.5% of residents lived in urban areas, while 0.5% lived in rural areas.

There were 8,958 households in Kaysville, of which 52.4% had children under the age of 18 living in them. Of all households, 77.0% were married-couple households, 6.9% were households with a male householder and no spouse or partner present, and 14.4% were households with a female householder and no spouse or partner present. About 10.7% of all households were made up of individuals and 5.9% had someone living alone who was 65 years of age or older.

There were 9,175 housing units, of which 2.4% were vacant. The homeowner vacancy rate was 0.4% and the rental vacancy rate was 6.7%.

Racial composition as of the 2020 census
| Race | Number | Percent |
|---|---|---|
| White | 29,894 | 90.7% |
| Black or African American | 198 | 0.6% |
| American Indian and Alaska Native | 117 | 0.4% |
| Asian | 333 | 1.0% |
| Native Hawaiian and Other Pacific Islander | 118 | 0.4% |
| Some other race | 542 | 1.6% |
| Two or more races | 1,743 | 5.3% |
| Hispanic or Latino (of any race) | 1,938 | 5.9% |

=== 2020 American Community Survey ===
According to the 2020 American Community Survey, the median income for a Kaysville household was $103,730, and the median family income was $111,903, with a per-capita income of $34,514. The median income for males who were full-time employees was $81,057 and for females $44,205. 3.2% of the population and 3.4% of families were below the poverty line.

In terms of education attainment, out of the 17,847 people in Kaysville 25 years or older, 248 (1.4%) had not completed high school, 2,299 (12.9%) had a high school diploma or equivalency, 6,410 (35.9%) had some college or associate degree, 6,170 (34.6%) had a bachelor's degree, and 2,720 (15.2%) had a graduate or professional degree.

== Points of interest ==
- Davis High School
- The house where John Taylor died
- LeConte Stewart Artist Museum
- Utah Botanical Center
- Kay's Cross

== Notable people ==
- Rob Bishop, congressman
- Henry H. Blood, seventh governor of Utah
- Mikayla Cluff, professional soccer player
- James Cowser, former NFL player
- Jaxson Dart, NFL quarterback for the New York Giants
- Floyd Gottfredson, cartoonist in the Will Eisner Award Hall of Fame
- Bode Hidalgo (né Davis), professional soccer player
- Jared Ward, Olympic marathon runner
